= Academia literaria =

Gathering with literary or artistic overtones

The academia literaria ('literary academy') was a literary tertulia popular during Spain's Golden Age (Siglo de Oro) of literature and the arts, from the early sixteenth century to the late seventeenth century (c. 1500 – 1681), and especially during the reign of the Spanish Habsburgs and, in particular, that of King Philip II (1556–1598), a significant patron of Spanish art and culture. By the seventeenth century, these literary academies had become "one of the most prominent features of literary life... in Spain", and many leading men of letters, such as Lope de Vega, Luis de Góngora, Luis Vélez de Guevara and Francisco de Quevedo would be members of more than one academia.

Many sought to make their voices heard in the literary gatherings frequented by poets and artists for the amusement and entertainment of nobles and patrons: the academia literaria. Nobles frequently attended these gatherings, with one often assuming the role of Academy president, while a distinguished literary figure took on the position of "secretary". Membership in some academies could require certain qualifications, such as having published multiple works, or just one if it was a heroic poem, though attendance itself did not have such restrictions. Zaragoza, as the capital of the kingdom of Aragón was, along with Madrid, one of Spain's most important centres of academic activity in the seventeenth century.

At the end of the first part of Don Quixote (1605), Miguel de Cervantes refers to the 'Academia de Argamasilla', in "a place in La Mancha". In all likelihood there was no such academia, but Cervantes' experience of these literary gatherings led him to make derisive reference to a tertulia of people from La Mancha. He also makes more general or specific references to the academias in other, later works, including in "Rinconete y Cortadillo" (Novelas Ejemplares, 1611). Moreover, according to Francisco Márquez Villanueva, Cervantes' Viaje del Parnaso (1614) is a "monumental sarcastic takedown on the pompous aspirations of the academies".

Each gathering would close with a vejamen (lampoon), a satirical piece of prose that was "an integral part of any academy session".

== Notable academias in Spain ==
- Academia Imitatoria [Academy of the Art of Imitation] (Madrid, 1584 or c. 1590): Madrid's first academia literaria was mentioned by Juan Rufo in 1596 as imitating the famous Italian academias. Most likely a member of it himself, Cervantes mentions it in his "The Dialogue of the Dogs" (Novelas ejemplares, 1613) as Academia de los Imitadores [Academy of Imitators] and again, this time indirectly, in the second part of Don Quixote (1615). Lupercio Leonardo de Argensola, a close friend of Cervantes' was also a member.
- Academia de los Nocturnos [Literary Society of the Night Revelers] (Valencia, 4 October 1591 – April 1594): Its ten founding members were Bernardo Catalán (Silencio), Hernando Pretel (Sueño), Gaspar Aguilar (Sombra), Francisco Pacheco (Fiel), Fabián de Cucaló (Horror), Maximiliano Oscuridad (Matías Fajardo) (Temeridad), Francisco D'Esplugues (Descuido), Francisco Agustin Tarrega (Miedo), Miguel Beneyto (Sosiego) and Gaspar de Villalón (Tinieblas). Another forty-five members would join over the course of this academy's existence, including Guillen de Castro (Secreto), Pelegrín Cathalán (Cuydado), Juan Andrés Núñez (Lucero), Hernando de Balda (Cometa), Estacio Gironella, Evaristo Mont, Andrés Rey de Artieda (Cautela), Jaime Orts (Tristeza), Jerónimo de Virués (Estudio), Guillem Belvis, Gaspar Gracián (Peligro), Manuel Ledesma (Recogimiento), Gaspar Mercader (Relámpago), Juan López Maldonado (Sincero) Tomás Cerdán de Tallada (Trueno), Juan Fenollet (Temeroso), Escolano (Luz), and Matías Fajardo (Oscuridad). The academy held 88 weekly sessions over its three years of existence, during which its members submitted 805 works in verse and 88 works in prose.
- Academia de los Humildes de Villamanta (21 January 1592): Members included Lupercio Leonardo de Argensola.
- Academia de Francisco Pacheco (Seville). Although founded earlier by Juan de Mal Lara, with Fernando de Herrera and the Dean of Seville Cathedral, Francisco Pacheco, by 1597, the painter Francisco Pacheco, nephew of the Dean, had taken over as director. Its gatherings brought together painters, poets and writers such as Francisco de Rioja, Juan de Arguijo, Antonio Ortíz Melgarejo,Luis del Alcázar, Pablo de Céspedes, Juan de Jáuregui, Francisco de Rioja, Gaspar de Zamora, the Duke of Alcalá de los Gazules, Cervantes, Francisco de Calatayud, Melchor del Alcázar, Baltasar del Alcázar and Juan de la Cueva.
- Academia de Ochoa (Seville, c. 1598): Founded by Juan de Ochoa, its members included Cervantes and Lope, who was received by this academia in 1598. Cervantes coincided there with Mateo Alemán, Alonso Álvarez de Soria and Luis Vélez de Guevara.
- Academia [de] Saldaña, Academia de Madrid or Academia Castellana (Madrid): Refers to two academias founded by Diego de Sandoval y Rojas, 9th Count of Saldaña, the son of the powerful Duke of Lerma, on two occasions; 1604 and 19 November 1611, although another source states that the academy's first session was held on 15 April 1612, with an inaugural speech by Vélez de Guevara. Its members included Góngora, Quevedo, Lope, Cervantes, and Luis Vélez de Guevara, secretary to the Count. Among the sources that refer to Cervantes having attending Saldaña's academia is a letter by Lope to the Duke of Sessa, dated 2 March 1612, in which he comments on having had to borrow Cervantes' spectacles ("... which looked like badly fried eggs...") in order to read his own verse at that event, which he refers to, at that time, as having taken place at the "academia de Parnaso", although it would later also be known as the Academia Selvaje.
  Lope himself was the Secretary, albeit for only two weeks, due to the difficulties the role entailed. Other attendees, either as men of letters themselves or as patrons of the Arts, included Andrés de Claramonte, the Duke of Pastrana, Francisco de Borja (Prince Esquilache), Count of Lemos, the Count of Cantillana, Diego Duque de Estrada, and the Count-Duke of Olivares.
  Cervantes' Novelas Ejemplares (1611), was dedicated to Pedro Fernández de Castro, Count of Lemos, one of the regular attendees of this academia. Lemos, while viceroy of Naples had been a patron of the Accademia degli Oziosi created there in 1611. Other works Cervantes dedicated to Lemos include the second part of Don Quixote (1615), Persiles, completed just days before he died. In January 1612, Lope informed Sessa that sessions were still being held by the Academy and that, although he no longer attended, he still sent, "always", a sonnet dedicated to the Virgin. The academia finally broke up due to the animosity between two opposing factions following a violent row between Pedro Soto de Rojas and Luis Vélez de Guevara. Many of its members then joined the Academia de Parnaso.
- Congregación del Santísimo Sacramento [Congregation of the Most Saintly Sacrament] (Madrid, c. 1606): Founded by the Archbishop of Toledo, Bernardo de Sandoval and the Duke of Lerma, its members included Vicente Espinel, Quevedo, Alonso Jerónimo de Salas Barbadillo, Luis Vélez de Guevara and Cervantes, all of whom also attended the Academia de Saldaña.
- Academia de Pítima (full name: Pítima contra la ociosidad, Aragón, 9 June – 30 August 1608): Founded under the patronage of Count of Guimerà. The Biblioteca Nacional de España has the statutes, minutes, and many of the compositions of this academy preserved in MS. 9396.
- Academia de Huesca (Aragón, August 1610 – 20 July 1611). Its members included Justo de Torres, Jorge Salinas, Juan Miguel de Luna and Bartolomé Santolaria.
- Academia de Parnaso, later renamed Academia Salvaje or Academia Madrileña (Madrid, February April 1612 – summer 1614): Founded by Francisco de Silva, its members included Cervantes, Luis Vélez de Guevara, Alonso de Salas Barbadillo, Lope, Quevedo, Góngora. In February 1612, Lope, in one of his regular letters to the Duke of Sessa, mentioned the opening of the Academia del Parnaso at Francisco de Silva's home, adding that "there were no nobles present; they must not yet know of it; it will last until they do".
- Academia de Montañeses del Parnaso (Valencia, 1616): founded by Guillén de Castro, members included Juan Yagüe de Salas.
- Academia Medrano (also known as the Academia Poética de Madrid ['Poetic Academy of Madrid']): Although it probably started in 1607, presided by Félix Arias Girón, from 1616 to 1622 it was held at the house of Sebastian Francisco de Medrano. Its members included Lope, Quevedo, Góngora, Tirso (c. 1620), Luis Vélez de Guevara, Calderón, Alonso de Castillo Solórzano, Prince Esquilache, José Pellicer, Anastasio Pantaleón de Ribera and Guillen de Castro.
- Academia Peregrina (1621): Manuscript 3,889 (Poesías varias) of the Biblioteca Nacional de España (BNM) contains what appears to be a foundational charter for a "Peregrine Academy" which, however, never became active. This document was likely authored by Sebastian Francisco de Medrano, founder and president of the Medrano Academy (also known as the Poetic Academy of Madrid). Medrano's document included the names of three official patrons; the Duke consort of Híjar, the Count of Oñate, and the Count of Sástago. Sebastián Fernández de Medrano, sole-director of the Royal Military and Mathematics Academy of Brussels, authored Foundation and Rules of the Academy Called La Peregrina, indicating that the academy may have focused on military studies and geography. However, the exact publication date is uncertain.
- Academia del Buen Retiro (Madrid, first half of the 17th century): With minutes drawn up by Luis Vélez de Guevara, its members included Esquilache, Luis Menéndez de Haro, Antonio de Mendoza, and Francisco de Rojas Zorrilla, who was the victim of an attempt on his life which was attributed to the offence caused by his vejamen in 1637 or February 1638.
- Academia de los Anhelantes (Zaragoza, active from 1636 to 1646): Founded by Juan Francisco André de Ustarroz, its members included Francisco Díez de Aux, Fernández de Heredia, Bernardo Sanz de Cuenca, Francisco de Freiras, Pedro Francisco Pérez de Soria, Juan Nadal, Martín Peyrón, Juan Lucas García, Tomás Andrés Cebrián, and Lupercio Argensola,
- (Valladolid, 1601–1605)
- (Toledo, 1603/1603): Founded by the Count of Fuensalida.
- (Zaragoza, c. 1620 - 1630): Founded under the patronage of the Viceroy of Aragon, Francisco de Borja (Prince Esquilache), members included Vicente Sánchez, Francisco Montáñez, Francisco del Cerro, Jacinto Marta, Pedro Samper, José Gracian, Felix Espinosa y Malo, Felipe Bardají, Baltasar Villalpando, Luis Sánchez, Joseph Alberto Tudela, Luis Bracho, the Count of Las Almunias, Esteban Galcerán Pinos Castro y Aragón, the Count of Villar, Miguel Cabrero, Manuel Teza, Baltasar Barutel, Vicencio Segovia, Gaspar Segovia, and Diego Gómez y Mendoza.
- (Cádiz, 1639): Founded by Juan Ignacio de Soto y Avilés, members included Alonso Chirino Bermúdez.
- (Zaragoza, c. 1650): A later Viceroy of Aragon, the Count of Lemos, founded a new academy whose members included the Duke of Híjar, the Marquis of Torres, the Marquis de San Felices, Jorge la Borda, Silvestre Cabrera, Diego López, Antonio Altarriba, Juan Bautista Alegre, Alberto Díez, Lorenzo Idiáquez and his brother, Doctor Idiáquez, a Doctor Ramírez, Juan Francisco Andrés de Ustarroz, Matías Aguirre, Jose Navarro, and the Count of Lemos' son, the Count of Andrade.
- (Zaragoza, c. 1650): Around the time that his father, the Count of Lemos, held his academy, the Conde de Andrade would also be the patron of an academy whose members included many of the above literary figures, including the Marquis de San Felices, Juan Francisco Andrés de Ustarroz, Silvestre Cabrera, the Marquis de Cañizar, José Navarro, Jose Bardají, Francisco la Torre, Gaspar Agustín Reus y Coscón, Juan Jaime Esporrín, Juan Lorenzo Ibáñez, Matías Ginovés, and the Licenciado Agreda.
- (Granada, c. 1652): Founded by Sebastián López Hierro de Castro, its first session included the Discurso contra el ocio y en loor del ejercicio, by Pedro Soto de Rojas.
- Academia de los Desconfiados (Barcelona, c. 1702): Founded by Pablo Ignasio Delmases y Ros.

=== Dates unknown ===
- Academia de Tarazona.
- Academia de Mendoza: Members included María de Zayas.
- Academia del Conde de Aliaga (Madrid).
- Academia de Juan de Arguijo (Seville): Members included Lope and Cervantes.
- Academia del Duque de Alcalá (Seville).
- Academia de los Adorantes (Valencia).
- Academia de los Soles (Valencia).

== See also ==
- Conceptismo
- Culteranismo
- Salon (gathering)
