= Parnaso Español =

The Parnaso Español: colección de poesías escogidas de los más célebres poetas castellanos ("Spanish Parnassus: collection of selected poems from the most famous Spanish poets"), or simply Parnaso Español, is an anthology edited by Juan José López de Sedano. It was published in nine volumes, between 1768 and 1778. The first five volumes were printed by Joaquín Ibarra by request of Antonio de Sancha, who printed the remaining volumes in his newly inaugurated press.

The collection contains works by the following authors:

- Baltasar del Alcázar
- Gonzalo Argote de Molina
- Juan de Arguijo
- Luis Barahona de Soto
- Jerónimo Bermúdez
- Francisco de Borja
- Bartolomé Cairasco de Figueroa
- Francisco de Calatayud y Sandoval
- Miguel de Cervantes Saavedra
- Gutierre de Cetina
- Juan de la Cueva
- Alonso de Ercilla y Zúñiga
- Vicente Espinel
- Pedro Espinosa
- Francisco de Figueroa
- Damasio de Frías
- Luis de Góngora y Argote
- Gregorio Hernández de Velasco
- Fernando de Herrera
- Juan Antonio de Herrera
- Diego Hurtado de Mendoza
- Juan Jáuregui y Aguilar
- Pedro Laínez
- Alonso de Ledesma
- Fray Luis de León
- Bartolomé Leonardo de Argensola
- Lupercio Leonardo de Argensola
- Francisco López de Zárate
- Ignacio de Luzán
- Luis Martín de la Plaza
- Pedro de Medina
- Cristóbal de Mesa
- Juan de Morales
- Francisco Pacheco
- Pedro de Padilla
- Hortensio Félix Paravicino y Arteaga
- Manuel Pellicer de Velasco
- Salvador Jacinto Polo de Medina
- Francisco de Quevedo
- Bernardino de Rebolledo
- Andrés Rey de Artieda
- Anastasio Pantaleón de Ribera
- Francisco de Rioja
- Alonso Jerónimo de Salas Barbadillo
- Pedro Silvestre
- Pedro Soto de Rojas
- Cristóbal Suárez de Figueroa
- Agustín de Tejada Páez
- Francisco de la Torre y Sevilla
- Luis de Ulloa
- Juan de Valdés
- Lope de Vega
- Garcilaso de la Vega
- Alonso Verdugo de Castilla
- Esteban Manuel de Villegas
- Luis Zapata de Chaves
