= Francisco Pacheco (poet) =

Spanish poet and theologian (1535–1599)

- Born: Jerez de la Frontera (Cádiz)
- Baptised: 22 November 1535
- Died: 10 October 1599 (aged 63); Seville

Francisco Pacheco (baptised 22 November 1535 – 10 October 1599) was a Spanish theologian, humanist, poet, and writer. Contemporary sources often refer to him as El Licenciado Pacheco or El Canónigo Pacheco.

Miguel de Cervantes, in his La Galatea, which he finished writing between 1580 and 1584, dedicates his tribute to Pacheco before that of any other Sevillian poet, including Fernando de Herrera, as well as dedicating him two octaves as opposed to the one each he dedicates to the others.

== Education ==
In 1555, Pacheco obtained his bachelor's degree in Arts and Philosophy from the Colegio-Universidad de Santa María de Jesús and between 1559 and 1563 studied Theology there.

== Career and writings ==
In 1565, he earned the chaplaincy of the Chapel of St Peter in Seville Cathedral.

At around that time, Pacheco entered Fernando de Herrera's circle of "doctos amigos" ["learned friends"], poets and humanists, which included Francisco de Medina, who had studied Theology at the same time as Pacheco, Juan de Mal Lara, Diego Girón Baltasar del Alcázar, and Gonzalo Argote de Molina. He also came to the attention of the Cathedral chapter (Cabildo), which commissioned him to put in order the archives of the Biblioteca Capitular as well as accepting his proposal for the commemorative Latin epigraph for the Giralda. In 1570, he collaborated with Juan de Mal Lara for the iconographical programme to represent the city of Seville on the occasion of King Philip II's visit.

In 1571, he was elected chaplain of the Royal Chapel, belonging to the Crown. However, the following year the Cathedral chapter accused him of having stolen books from the Biblioteca Capitular and he was dispossessed of the Cathedral prebend, that is, the chapel of St Peter, and the right to give Mass in the Cathedral. However, as the Royal Chapel belonged to the Crown, that prebend was not affected.

He spent the following few years composing his Latin poems and working for the (Cabildo (city council) preparing inscriptions for the Alameda de Hércules (1574) and the Puerta de la Carne (1577). Towards the end of that decade, the Cathedral chapter ended their ostracism of him and he was again commissioned to prepare iconographical programmes for the Cathedral's chapterhouses (1579) and for its main monstrance (1580-1587).

The arrival of the new Archbishop of Seville, Rodrigo de Castro, in 1581, saw Pacheco being promoted to Crown Administrator of the Hospital de San Hermenegildo, also known as the Hospital del Cardenal, traditionally associated as a step towards becoming bishop. The following year, the archbishop appointed him canon and commissioned him to draw up the Officia propria Sanctorum Hispalensis Ecclesiae et Diocesis, which set out the liturgical ritual for the veneration of the saints in Seville. He also prepared reports for the Inquisition regarding the censorship of books.

In 1594, Pacheco and Arias Montano prepared a list of books to be sent, through the mediation of Jan Moretus, to Seville from Flanders.

Although the Crown had instituted disciplinary proceedings in 1596 for corruption at the Hospital, for which Pacheco would be dismissed shortly before his death in 1599, in 1597 King Philip appointed him senior chaplain of the Royal Chapel, enabling him to continue working on the spectacular Tomb of Philip II (Túmulo del rey Felipe II en Sevilla).

== Academia de Francisco Pacheco ==
The Academia de Francisco Pacheco was an academia literaria in Seville which brought together painters, poets and writers such as Pablo de Céspedes, Juan de Jáuregui, Francisco de Rioja, Cervantes, Baltasar del Alcázar and Juan de la Cueva. Run by the painter Francisco Pacheco, the poet's nephew, who had adopted his uncle's name as a pseudonym, it was the continuation of an earlier academia founded by Juan de Mal Lara, Fernando de Herrera and his uncle, Francisco Pacheco. By 1597, the painter had taken over as director.

== Works ==
=== Poems ===
- Macarronea, 1565: a satirical and earthy poem written in pig-Latin ("marraconea") made up of 632 hexameters criticising the Church, the University and poetic circles.
- Sátira apologética en defensa del divino Dueñas [Apologetic Satire in Defence of the Divine Dueñas] or Sátira contra la mala poesía [Satire Against Bad Poetry], 1569: made up of 706 hendecasyllables ridiculing the Sevillian poetic circes and a bitter critique of social aspects such as the monopoly of landownership by the monasteries, inequality of Man at birth, misery or bad governance. Although Juan de Dueñas was a popular 15th-century poet, Pacheco himself explains that the origin of this satire was as an anecdote of wounded pride when, in 1569, Pacheco and his fellow-poet Diego Ramírez de Dueñas were seated in the cathedral and another poet, named Cuevas, walked past without doffing his hat. Pacheco got his friend to repeat aloud a tercet that went: "Young Espadarte's new cloak annoys me,/ as he wears it to seek / the congratulations of all." Mistakenly believing that Dueñas has composed the tercet, Cuevas and his friends composed a satire against Dueñas, leading to a spate of satires being recited in public between the two warring factions. The Count of Monteagudo, the city's asistente, the highest-ranking civil authority of the city, had all the city's poets arrested and put in jail, leading to another satire being sent in defence of the jailed poets and they were all released.
- Sermones sobre la instauración de la libertad del espíritu [Sermons on Restoration of the Freedom of the Spirit], c. 1573: two extensive Horatian epistles in hexameters, strongly criticising the contemporary social order –nobility, royalty, slavery, torture, Law, Court, Church– and expressing the ideal of withdrawing to the Peña de Aracena (Note: A reference to the hermitage in the Sierra de Huelva to which Benito Arias Montano had withdrawn some years earlier (before attending the Council of Trent).) together with Benito Arias Montano and Pedro Vélez de Guevara, and his most intimate colleagues, to devote themselves to poetry, erudition and Christian spirituality and to thus conquer the freedom of the spirit.
