= Francisco Pacheco (disambiguation) =

Francisco Pacheco may refer to:

- Francisco Pacheco de Toledo (1508–1579), Spanish cardinal
- Francisco Pacheco (poet) (1535–1599), Spanish poet and theologian
- Francisco Pacheco (1564–1644), Spanish painter
- Francisco Pacheco (martyr), Portuguese missionary in Japan (1565–1626)
- Francisco Pérez Pacheco (1790–1860), Californio ranchero
- Francisco Pacheco (singer) (born 1955), Venezuelan folk singer and drummer
- Francisco Pacheco (politician) (born 1964), Indian politician
- Francisco Antonio Pacheco Fernández (born 1959), Costa Rican philosopher and statesman
- Francisco José Pacheco (born 1982), Spanish road bicycle racer
