= Joaquín Ibarra =

Spanish printer

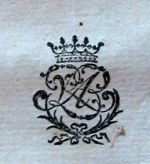
Marca de impresor de Joaquín Ibarra de 1781

Joaquín Ibarra y Marín, also known as Joaquín Ibarra, (Zaragoza, July 20, 1725 - Madrid, November 13, 1785) was a Spanish printer who was known for several important technical developments in the fields of the press, books, and typography. Some of his most important works are Conhuración de Catilina y la guerra de Yugurta, printed in 1772, and an edition of Don Quijote de la Mancha, as well as Real Academia Española, done in 1780.

Ibarra was influenced by Baskerville, Didot and Bodoni.

== Early life and career ==
Ibarra studied at Cervera, in the province of Lleida, as an apprentice to his brother Manuel, who was serving as first officer of Printing Pontifical and Royal University. He also studied academics, learning Latin and classical culture bases. As teacher, he moved to Madrid in 1754, setting up a print shop with 16 presses. Working alongside the best painters and engravers of his time, Ibarra was a well recognized printer. Ibarra was an innovator. The ink he used had exceptional quality and brilliance, based on a secret formula he invented.

Ibarra implemented several innovations in printing and the process of composition. He experimented with the satin of the paper to remove marks from the printing plate; established a standardized format for developing measures of graphic types, based on the surface of a capital, similar in principle to the rules to be developed by Fournier independently; and typographical conventions such as using V to represent U or using the same block for the long S and F.

One of his disciples, the later head of the Company of Printers and Booksellers in the United States, Jose Siguenza, systematically collected observations as a collection and published them in 1811 with the title Mechanism of the Printing Art.

Between 1754 and 1836, Ibarra continued to run his workshop, producing some 2,500 editions. Notable are the aforementioned de Cervantes and Sallust, the latter being printed as an edition of 120 copies for the use of the royal family and foreign dignitaries present. Other significant issues included the Spanish Paleography (1758), Plant History (1762), Breviarium regulam Gothicum Beatissimi Secundum Isidori (1775), the second edition of the Tour of Spain by Antonio Ponz, the General History of Spain by John Mariana (1780), and the Bibliotheca Hispana Vetus et Nova (1783 - 1788), in four volumes.

He collaborated with the publisher Antonio Sancha before it established its own printing press, printing among other works the first volumes of the Spanish Parnassus.

== Contributions ==
Ibarra made many contributions to the art of printing, including conducting experiments with paper. He began to experiment with paper in an effort to reduce plate mark impressions. Ibarra also developed a standardized measure for the production of type and created a formula for ink. These contributions are seen in most of his best-known works.

Considered one of Spain's finest printers, Joaquin Ibarra was printer to the Court of Spain. The Spanish version of Sallust is widely considered to be one of the finest books ever produced and was greatly admired by Benjamin Franklin.

== Type ==
Ibarra did not design, engrave, or cast types, contrary to what is often assumed. The error is probably based on the documents in his edition of Don Quixote of the Royal Academy, for which they made a new cast (but not a new design).

Ibarra's printing used various foundries of his time, especially games Gerónimo Gil, the Smelter Rangel (used by the Gazette, and really a game of Garamond), types of Lleida Eudald Pradell with casting Madrid, a game of Garamond, and the celebrated and reviled italic cast which composed the Sallust, abierta created by the academic and writer Murcia Espinosa de los Monteros, who owned a foundry in Madrid.

In the early twentieth century, Madrid smelter Gans held a revival called Ibarra from several of these castings, which was the starting point for other recent redesigns.

According to expert Mariano Villegas Garcia, there were many outstanding typographers and printers during the Golden Age of Spain. One exceptionally recognized among them was Don Juaquin Ibbara Marin, followed by Don Antonio Sancha, who was also a bookbinder.

Ibarra was also known for creating his own paper. Creating different mottled paper grades depends on the way in which colors are deposited and manipulated. His technique consisted of preparing paper in a rubber bath which served as background.

It was necessary to prepare this in one or two liters of cold water with about 50 grams of “Alquitira” rubber (Tragacanto), stirred at intervals while adding up to six liters of water as the rubber is undoing the process (which usually takes up to three days), then passing it through a filter, strainer, or cheesecloth. Once he had a proper background, he prepared the colors, which are pigments found in vegetables, and poured them into the bath, where they rushed to the bottom instead of floating as needed. The colors were mixed on a smooth surface with a creamy mass binding. Then he would stir it with a spatula. The densities of the mixture of colors allowed him to control the colors being added (he used drops of ox gall was when he preferred a smoother finish). If the color of the pigment was too creamy, he added contrast. Once the colors were prepared and spread, he manipulated them with sticks, needles, combs, etc., to form the drawings.

== Printed work ==
Two major books he printed were La conjuración de Catilina y La guerra de Iugurta (1772) and El ingenioso hidalgo don Quixote de La Mancha (1780).

La conjuración de Catilina y La guerra de Iugurta was considered a masterpiece because of several pages filled with illustrations by Mariano Maella. It was customary for Ibarra projects to contain a perfect flow of harmonious type, inks, illustration, margins, and textures. Only 120 volumes were printed and were distributed to the royal family, institutions, and major personalities in Spain.

El ingenioso hidalgo don Quixote de La Mancha was a deluxe edition of Don Quixote, in four volumes, made on paper called "ex profeso" with melted types of "ex novo" on the pages. The text in this edition was a rendition of the second edition of 1605 Cuesta. This contemporary piece, which was known as an artistic piece, was entrusted to the Academy of San Fernando.

There are about 2,500 works that are recognized to have come out of Ibarra's workshop over a course of eight decades.

Some of the books he printed are

- Juicio imparcial sobre las letras, en forma de breve, que ha publicado la Curia Romana, en que se intentan derogar ciertos Edictos del... Duque de Parma. Madrid: en la oficina de D. Joachin de Ibarra, 1769,
- QUEVEDO, Francisco de, Politica de Dios y gobierno de Christo : sacada de la Sagrada Escritura para acierto de rey, y reyno en sus acciones. Madrid: por D. Joachin Ibarra, 1772,
- PONZ, Antonio, Viage de España o Cartas en que se da noticia de las cosas mas apreciables y dignas de saberse que hay en ella. Madrid: por D. Joachin Ibarra, 1772,
- BECCARIA, Cesare Bonesana, Marchese di, Tratado de los delitos y de las penas. Traducido del italiano por D. Juan Antonio de las Casas. Madrid: por D. Joachin Ibarra, 1774

When Ibarra died in 1785, his wife and children ran the workshop until 1836.

Year	Number of Books
1768	28
1769	18
1770	18
1771	26
1772	17
1773	18
1774	15
1775	42
1776	32
1777	40
1778	36
1779	34
1780	38
1781	33
1782	48

== See also ==
- Ibarra (tipografía)
- Ibarra Real (tipografía)
- Tipografía española

== Bibliography ==
- Acín Fanlo, José Luis; Murillo López, Pablo; Serón Arbeloa, Francisco José; Pulido, I.; Baldassarri, Sandra S. (1993). Joaquín Ibarra y Marín, impresor, 1725–1785. Caja de Ahorros y Monte de Piedad de Zaragoza, Aragón y Rioja (Ibercaja, Obra Social y Cultural). ISBN 978-84-87007-92-7.

•Joaquin Ibarra, el grabado y las artes impresorias en el Madrid del siglo XVIII. Memoria para Optar al Grado de Doctor Presenrada por Mariano Villegas Garcia, 2001
