= Juan de Mal Lara =

Spanish Renaissance poet, playwright, humanist, and paremiologue

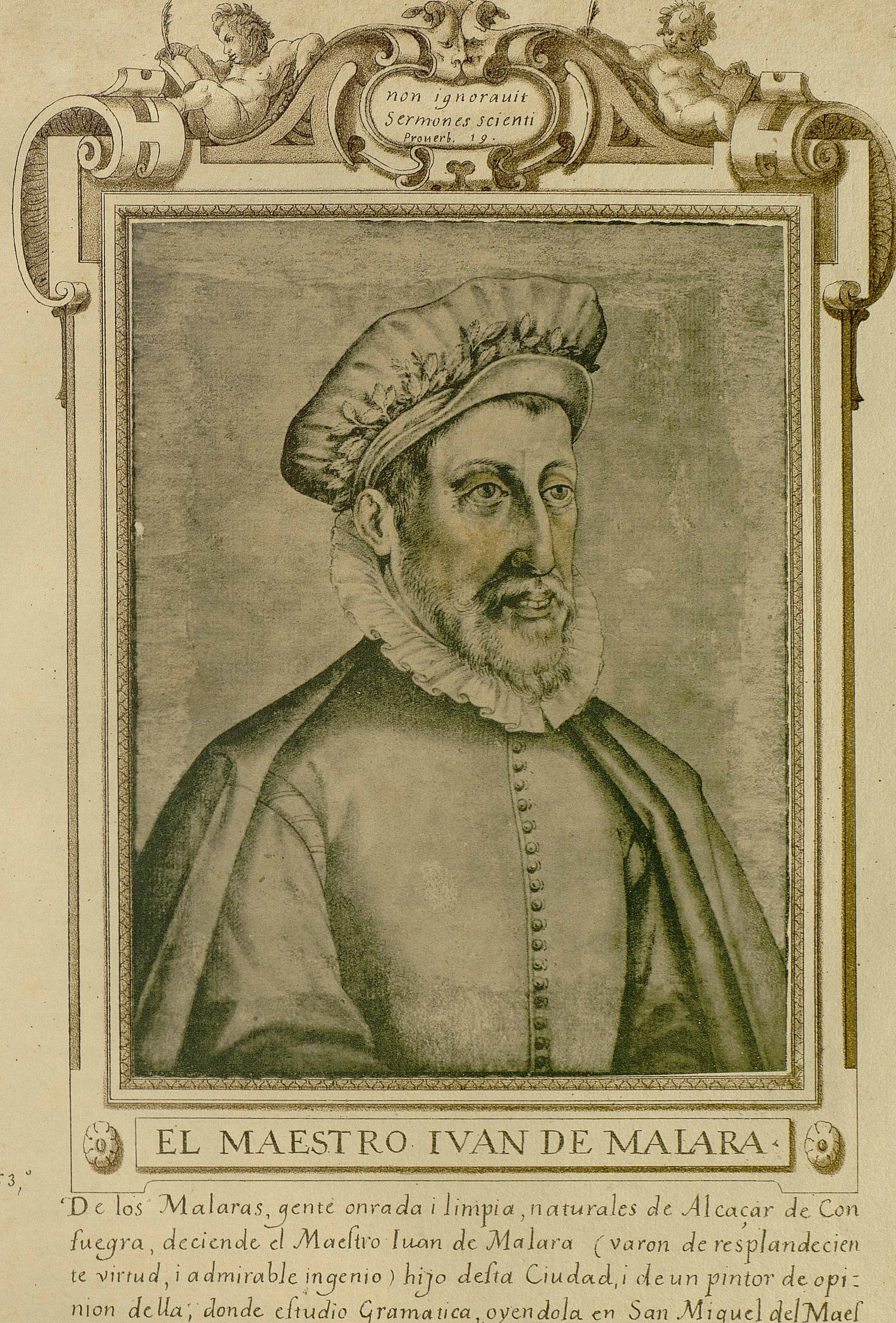
Juan de Mal Lara, by Francisco Pacheco

Juan de Mal Lara (Sevilla, 1524 – Sevilla, 1571) was a Spanish humanist, poet, playwright and paremiologue at the University of Seville during the period of the Spanish Renaissance in the reign of Philip II of Spain.

== Biography ==
Mal Lara studied Latin and Greek grammar at the College of San Miguel in Sevilla. His teacher was Pedro Fernandez de Castilleja and later Mal Lara taught humanities to Mateo Alemán. It was a decade later, after studying at the University of Salamanca, where he was student of Hernán Núñez one of classmates was Francisco Sánchez de las Brozas, known as the "Brocense"; later he went to Valencia and Barcelona, where he completed his studies with Francisco Escobar before returning again to Salamanca. In 1548 he returned to Seville to study arts. By 1550 he taught at humanities and literature in a grammar school in Sevilla.

In 1565, the Count of Gelves in Seville, established his "Merlin's Garden" in the fields near Tablada, and this became a regular gathering of an academic circle which also included Baltasar del Alcázar, Francisco Pacheco, Juan de la Cueva, Christopher Mosquera de Figueroa, Cristóbal de Mesa, Francisco de Medina and Fernando de Herrera, a group later known as the Sevillian Poetry School. Herrera would later include Mal Lara in his circle of "doctos amigos" ["learned friends"], poets and humanists, which included Pacheco, Medina, who had studied Theology at the same time as Pacheco, Diego Girón and Alcázar.

Mal Lara was investigated by the Spanish Inquisition in 1561, but was cleared of all charges in 1566, the year he moved to Madrid to join the royal court of king Philip II of Spain. Philip of Spain also claimed to be king of England and Ireland following his marriage to Mary I of England was known as 'the prudent' since despite several financial crisis was an intelligent ruler and dedicated philosophical scholar who particularly studied the work of the Roman orator Marcus Tullius Cicero which is why in modern Spanish a serious but informal discussion is called "una tertulia"

Within this intensive royal court Mal Laura composed verses to accompany or embellish certain paintings by Titian and was commissioned to create allegorical motif for the flagship of Don Juan de Austria, which included writing an elaborate description of "the royal galley of Serene Don Juan de Austria, Captain of all the Seas".

He married Maria de Ojeda with whom he had two daughters, Gila and Silvestra. He also worked with scholars and historians as important as Gonzalo Argote de Molina. He is credited, although this is widely disputed, with the invention of the structure of the ten-line stanza known as a Décima popularized Vicente Espinel, in whose honor the décima is also known as a "Spinel".

An unpublished biography of Mal Lara is preserved in the Municipal Archives of Seville.

== Works ==
In his lifetime he was mostly known for two works: Philosophia vulgar (Seville, 1568), the first part of which contains one thousand and one refrains: pithy sayings or proverbs to be learned by heart, in which preliminary discourse extols the wisdom embedded in ancient sayings, although this work sometimes follows the Adagia of Erasmus of Rotterdam and other similar classical writers.

The other major work was a tribute that Mal Lara wrote with Alonso Escribano for Rey Phelipe de Seuilla (Philip II Spain and thus also of Seville), to deliver in 1570 extolling the virtues of the very noble and loyal city of Seuilla in gratitude for the warm welcome received by Philip.

Mal Lara also described the lavish decoration of the walls of Seville with figures and allegorical verses representing the various divisions within the Seville jurisdiction. The book was published after the victory of the monarch against the Moorish rebellion of Alpujarras.

Psyche, a mythological poem in Hendecasyllable style was not well received at the time. It was inspired Psyche and Cupid included in The Golden Ass a novel of Apuleius. His fifth book was published by Mario Gasparini at the Trilingual University College of Salamanca in 1947. He also composed eclogues Narciso and Laurea, Annotations to the syntax of Erasmus, a philosophical dissertation Pilgrimage of life, as well as Principles of Grammar, guidance Notes on Emblems of Andrea Alciato, the Scholia of Rhetoric on the introductions of Aphthonius of Antioch, Chronicle of the Holy Apostles, a poem in octaves The Death of Orpheus and a Latin poem The Martyrdom of Saints Justa and Rufina, patron of Seville .

Some of his dramatic works are noteworthy, including the tragedy Absalom and the comedy Locusta, first performed at the University of Salamanca in 1548 both in Latin and Castilian languages; he continued this dramatic activity in Seville, where he composed the comedy In praise of Our Lady of Consolation performed by his students in Utrera in 1561. A probable work entitled Tragedy of San Hermenegildo is lost. Juan de la Cueva, in his Poetic Exemplar places Mal Lara him among the classical playwrights in the Aristotelian tradition, although with some reservations.

The Spirited Hercules is an erudite poetic work formerly believed lost but subsequently rediscovered via a copy within the Ajuda National Palace in Portugal. It was highly praised by his contemporaries and contains details about the Seville group and Chansonnier lyrics that deserve careful study. It is written in stanzas and divided into twelve books, each with four songs. It is dedicated to Prince Carlos with the intention to glorify twelve victories of his grandfather, alluded to allegorically within the main theme of the poem, by singing the praises of the mythological feats of the twelve labors of Hercules. Thus, the Nemean lion symbolizes the Revolt of the Comuneros, the Erymanthian Boar is Francis I of France, etc.

The poem ends with the vision of king Philip II as Theseus, essentially a new Hercules to relieve Atlas. Mal Lara started this work in 1549, but he died suddenly and so was unable to deliver the manuscript to the printer.

The surviving poems of Mal Lara may be found in Volume XLII of the Biblioteca de Autores Españoles; his complete works were published in three volumes by Manuel Bernal Rodríguez in 1996, within the Castro Library.

== Bibliography ==
- F. Sánchez y Escribano, Juan de Mal Lara: su vida y sus obras, New York: Hispanic Institute in the United States, 1941.
- Juan de Mal Lara,Obras completas; edited by and prologue of Manuel Bernal Rodríguez. Madrid: Turner, 1996, (Biblioteca Castro), notionally in three volumes of which only two are available.
- Jude, Véronique. 2013. Explication et argumentation dans la Philosophia vulgar de Juan de Mal Lara. Les proverbes dans l'Europe des XVIe et XVIIe siècles: Réalités et Représentations, ed. by Mary-Nelly Fouligny and Marie Roig Miranda, pp. 223–238. Nancy: Universite de Lorraine.
- Juan de Mal Lara at the Charles III University of Madrid
