= Alonso Álvarez de Soria =

Spanish adventurer and poet

Alonso Álvarez de Soria (1573–1603) was a Spanish adventurer and poet of the Spanish Golden Age. He was known as el Tuerto (the One-Eyed). His short but eventful life ended on the gallows.

== Life ==
Soria was born in Seville in 1573. He went to the Americas as a soldier (1595–1596) before returning to Seville.

As a satirical poet, Soria associated closely with the literati of Seville. Soria's works are frequently confused with those of Góngora and Quevedo. He had a reputation as a womanizer, and served as the model for the seducer Loaysa in Cervantes' El celoso extremeño (The Jealous Extremaduran). He also appeared in Cervantes' Viaje del Parnaso (Journey to Parnassus).

In 1603 Soria invented versos de cabo roto, a form of poetry in which the last (unstressed) syllable of each line is truncated. Several of Cervantes' poems in the prologue to Don Quixote are in this form, which "enjoyed some transitory popularity." One of Cervantes' poems ends in this way:

Dexa que el hombre de juy—
en las obras que compo—
se vaya con pies de plo—;
que el que saca a luz pape—
para entretener donze—,
escriue a tontas y a lo—.

Rutherford (2000) translates the above into English as:

The wise man should be most painsta—
And should proceed very discree—
In all the works that he relea—
For he whose fictional crea—
Are for young ladies' entertai—
Writes without any rhyme or rea—.

Soria composed a short stinging poem against Lope de Vega when the latter sent a manuscript of El peregrino en su patria to Juan de Arguijo for his approval.

A sonnet of Soria's appears in Juan Antonio Calderón's Flores de poetas ilustres de España.

== Death ==
In 1603, when Soria was only thirty years old, he was executed by hanging. Don Bernardino González de Avellaneda y Delgadillo, the Asistente of Seville, a victim of Soria's satirical pen, had the authority to send prisoners to the gallows without trial, and applied that authority in Soria's case despite popular protest. The poet Juan de la Cueva protested in verse, with the poem "A don Bernardino de Avellaneda, asistente de Sevilla, queriendo ahorcar a Alonso Álvarez de Soria" ("To Don Bernardino, asistente of Seville, wanting to hang Alonso Álvarez de Soria").

Quevedo alludes to Soria's death in his novel El Buscón (1626).
