= Perizonius =

Dutch classical scholar (1651–1715)

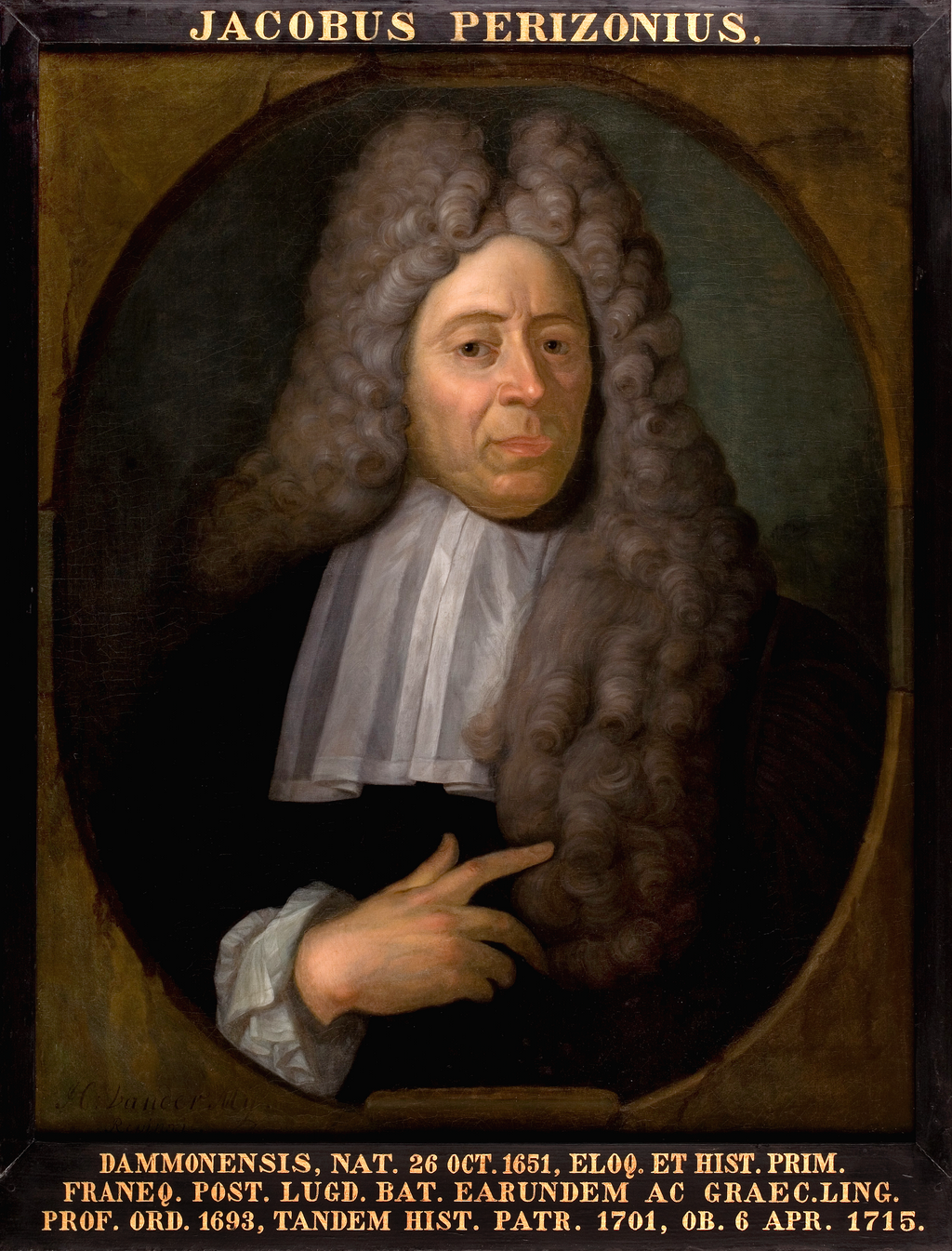
Perizonius

Perizonius (or Accinctus) was the name of Jakob Voorbroek (26 October 1651 – 6 April 1715), a Dutch classical scholar, who was born at Appingedam in Groningen.

He was the son of Anton Perizonius (1626–1672), the author of a once well-known treatise, De ratione studii theologici. Having studied at the University of Utrecht, he was appointed in 1682 to the chair of eloquence and history at Franeker through the influence of J. G. Graevius and Nikolaes Heinsius. In 1693 he was promoted to the corresponding chair at Leiden, where he died on 6 April 1715.

The numerous works of Perizonius entitle him to a high place among the scholars of his age. Special interest attaches to his edition of the Minerva sive de causis linguae latinae (Salamanca: Renaut, 1587) of Francisco Sánchez de las Brozas, aka El Brocense, (ed. C. L. Bauer, 1793–1801), one of the last developments of the study of Latin grammar in its pre-scientific stage, when the phenomena of language were still regarded as for the most part disconnected, conventional or fortuitous.

Mention should also be made of his Animadversiones historicae (1685), which may be said to have laid the foundations of historical criticism, and of his treatises on the Roman Republic, alluded to by Niebuhr as marking the beginning of the new era of historical study with which his own name is associated.

== Collection and heritage ==
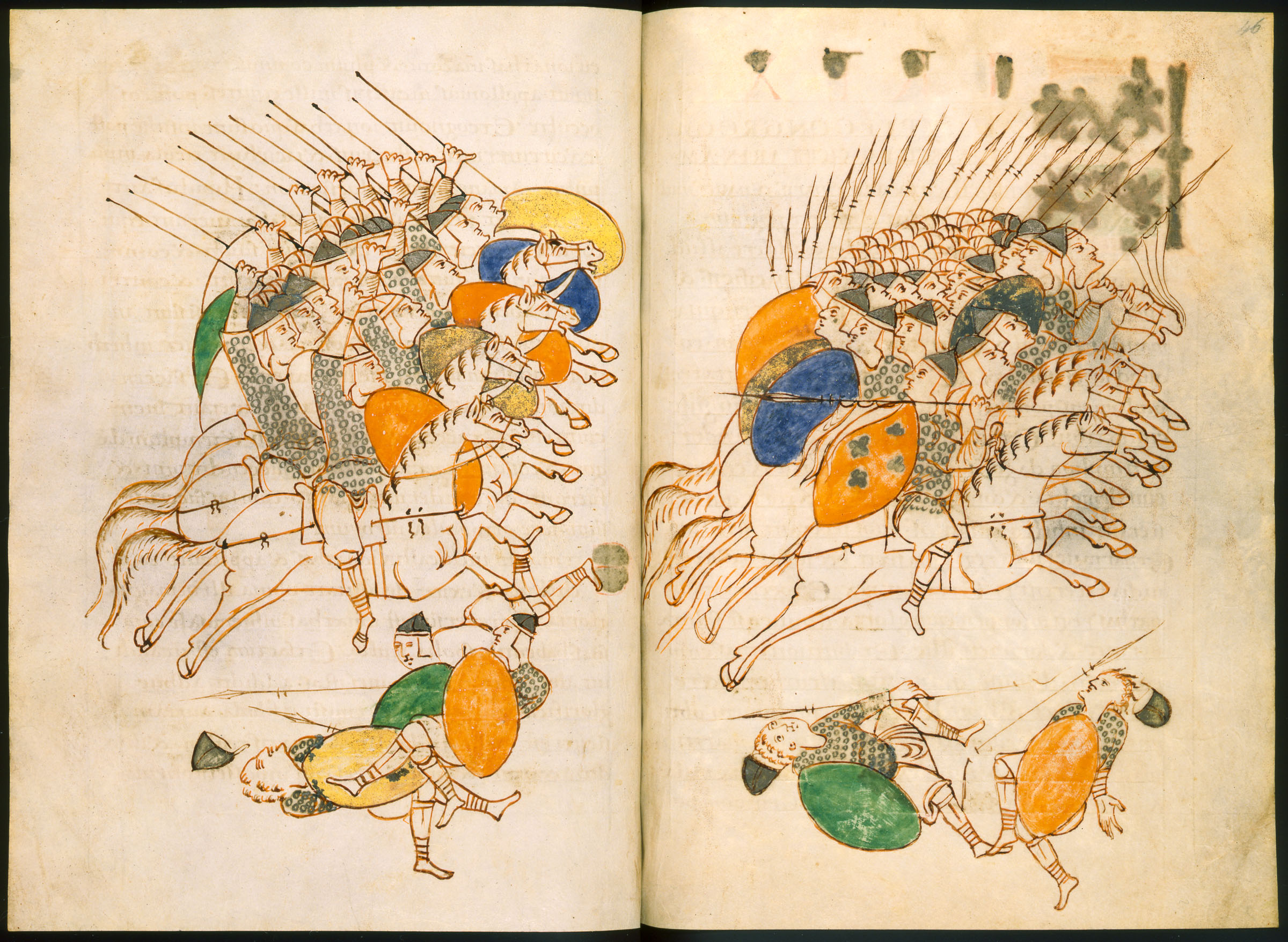
Manuscript from the Collection Perizonius (Leiden University Library, PER F 17)

Perizonius was a collector of rare books and manuscripts. To the Leiden University Library he bequeathed 134 manuscripts, one painting, many printed books and a legacy to buy new books. The manuscripts are kept separate as the Collection Perizonius in the library. One of the famous manuscripts in the Perizonius collection is a manuscript, probably from the Abbey of Saint Gall dating from the 10th century. It includes 1 Maccabees and the fourth book of Epitoma Rei Militaris by Vegetius. The manuscript includes many richly decorated pages depicting the historic invasion of Germany by the Hungarians. The digital version of MS PER F 17 is available on Leiden's Digital Collections.
