= Francisco Sánchez de las Brozas =

Spanish philologist and humanist

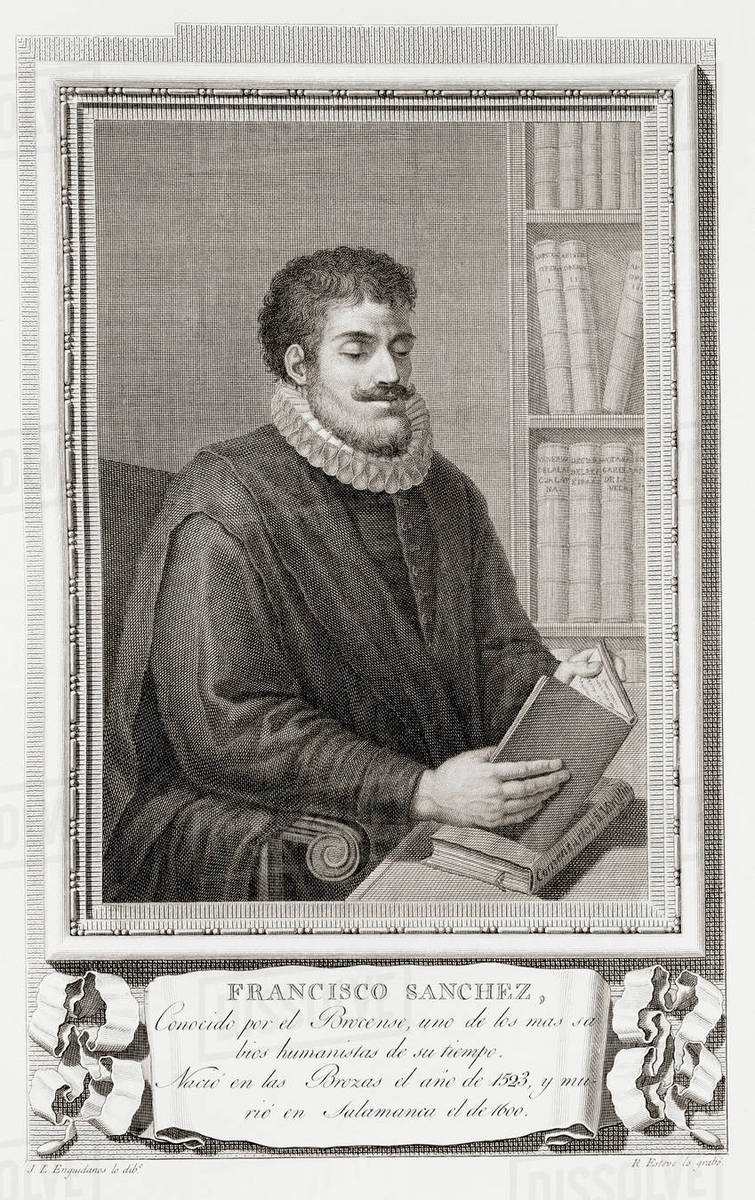
Francisco Sánchez de las Brozas; engraving by Rafael Esteve; from Portraits of Illustrious Spaniards (1791)

Francisco Sánchez de las Brozas (1523–1600), also known as El Brocense, and in Latin as Franciscus Sanctius Brocensis, was a Spanish philologist and humanist.

== Biography ==
Sanctius was born in Brozas, province of Cáceres. His parents, Francisco Núñez and Leonor Díez, were of noble birth but had little money. Sancius was able to study thanks to the support of relatives, starting in Évora, where he learnt Latin and humanities, and then in Lisbon. There he served Queen Catherine I and King John III of Portugal and remained in the court of the Portuguese kingdom until the death of the princess in 1545. In accordance with the desires of his supporting relatives, he went to the University of Salamanca, where he studied Arts and Theology, which he did not complete. There he met, among his fellow students, Juan de Mal Lara. While still a student he married his first wife, Ana Ruiz del Peso, who gave him six children. In 1554, as widower at the age of 32, he married a relative of his first wife, with whom he had another six children. After that he suffered economic hardship in supporting his family and was forced to teach without pause. He was awarded the chair of Rhetoric at Salamanca in 1573 after a failed attempt in 1554, and in 1576 was awarded the chair of the section of Greek language, with a higher salary. Despite two attempts he was unsuccessful in winning the chair of Grammar. In 1584 he had his first difficulties with the Inquisition, although he was exonerated. As a consequence of his great critical mind (for him the greatest authority was reason) and his noncomformity towards authority, the censors restricted the distribution of his works. A decade after his retirement, in 1595, new inquisitorial proceedings were initiated, which were only interrupted by his death. He died on 5 December 1600, isolated in his home as a result of house arrest imposed by the Inquisition.

The importance of the ideas of el Brocense in the reform of classical studies in Spain in the mid-16th century is comparable to that of Antonio de Nebrija at the beginning of the century. This appears in his Arte para saber latín (1595), in the Grammaticæ Græcæ compendium (1581) and, above all, in the Veræ brevesque Latinæ institutiones (1587), where he corrected Nebrija's method. Nevertheless, he is mostly remembered for his Minerva sive de causis linguæ Latinæ (Salamanca: Renaut, 1587), a Latin grammar in four books or sections (study of the parts of speech, the noun, the verb, and the figures), which subjected the study of language to reason. Minerva is one of the first epistemological grammars and made him a European celebrity for several generations. While the first grammarians of Humanism (Lorenzo Valla or Antonio de Nebrija) were still writing normative grammars based on the usus scribendi of the ancient authors, el Brocense took ratio (reason) as the cornerstone of his grammatical system. He acknowledged no authority other than reason and took to its ultimate consequences the logic of grammatical study.

He was determined to make everything fit within rational schemes, and in his grammatical interpretation gave a very important role to ellipsis, an essential tool of his system. In the search for rational explanations he stepped beyond the limits of the Latin language to go as far as to foreshadow a universal grammar implicit in all languages. He is thus a most important milestone towards Port-Royal Grammar and Noam Chomsky's generative grammar. His Minerva was very successful, with 15 editions by 1761. The dense scholia by Scioppius appeared in the mid 17th century and would accompany the Minerva until the 19th century. The notes by Perizonius were written at the request of a publisher from Franeker in the Netherlands. They were included in the 1687 edition and were so successful that the same publisher reprinted it fraudulently in 1693.

Sanctius published editions of the Bucolics by Virgil (1591), some works of Ovid, the Satyres by Persius and the Ars poetica by Horace; commented editions of the Sylvae by Angelo Poliziano and the Emblemata by Andrea Alciato; and translations of Horace and of the Canzoniere by Francesco Petrarca. He wrote and printed Comentarios to works by Juan de Mena and Garcilaso de la Vega (1582 and 1574 respectively). When he was accused of having identified the influences of Græco-Latin classics in the lyrical work of the latter, thus diminishing his poetic originality, el Brocense said that he didn't consider anyone who didn't imitate the classics a good poet. He also wrote a great number of Latin poems and scholia.

He had a mainly formal understanding of literary beauty, as revealed in his rhetorical treatises De arte dicendi (1556) and Organum dialecticum et rethoricum cunctis discipulis utilissimum et necessarium (Lyon, 1579). It is pertinent to point out here that he was tried by the Inquisition because he dared to criticise the literary form of the gospels. He favoured Erasmus of Rotterdam and in his scientific works shows the encyclopedic inclinations that were characteristic of Humanism, as in Declaración y uso del reloj español (1549), Pomponii Melæ De situ orbis (1574) or Sphera mundi ex variis auctoribus concinnata (1579). Among his philosophical works the main ones are Doctrina de Epicteto (1600), Paradoxa (1581) and De nonnulis Porphyrii aliorumque in dialectica erroribus (1588).

He had three encounters with the Inquisition: one, mentioned above, in 1584, where he was exonerated, a second in 1595, when he had already retired, and a third in 1600, which was interrupted before its resolution due to his death, in Salamanca, at the age of 78.

== Works ==
- Declaración y uso del reloj español (1549)
- Edition and commentary of Angelo Poliziano, Angeli Politiani: Sylvæ, nutricia, manto, rusticus, ambra illustratum per Franciscum Sanctium Brocensem, Salmanticæ: excudebat Andreas a Portonariis, 1554.
- De arte dicendi (1556)
- Edition and commentary of the Emblemata by Alciati: Comment. in And. Alciati Emblemata: nunc denuò multis in locis accurate recognita et quamplurimis figuris illustrata Lugduni: apud Guliel. Rouillium, 1573.
- Comentarios to the work by Garcilaso de la Vega (1574)
- Edition of Pomponii Melæ De situ orbis (1574)
- Organum dialectum et rethoricum cunctis discipulis utilissimum et necessarium (Lyon, 1579)
- Sphera mundi ex variis auctoribus concinnata (1579)
- Paradoxa (1581)
- Grammaticæ Græcæ compendium (1581)
- Comentarios to the work by Juan de Mena (1582)
- Minerva sive de causis linguæ Latinæ (Salamanca: Renaut, 1587)
- Veræ brevesque Latinæ institutiones (1587)
- De nonnulis Porphyrii aliorumque in dialectica erroribus (1588)
- Edition of the Bucolics by Virgil (1591)
- Edition and commentary of the Ars poetica by Horace: In Artem Poeticam Horatii Annotationes, Salmanticæ: Apud Joannem & Andream Renaut, fratres, 1591.
- Arte para saber latín (1595)
- Edition and commentary of Auli Persii Flacci Saturæ sex: cvm ecphrasi et scholiis Franc. Sanctij Brocen. Salmanticæ: apud Didacum à Cussio, 1599.
- Doctrina de Epicteto (1600)
