= Juan Vicentelo Leca y Toledo =

Spanish noble (1611–1636)

Juan Vicentelo Leca y Toledo Corso y Dávila, 1st Count of Cantillana (fl. 1611–1636) was a Spanish nobleman and patron of the Arts during Spain's Golden Age (Siglo de Oro) of literature and the arts. He was awarded the countship by King Philip III in 1611.

== Patron of the Arts ==
Andrés de Claramonte, one of the many major Spanish playwrights, including Lope de Vega, Quevedo, Góngora, and Cervantes who attended the literary gatherings of the academia literaria held at the palace of the Count of Saldaña in Madrid at the beginning of 17th century, cited Cantillana as one of the several patrons of the Arts who also attended these gatherings, including the Duke of Pastrana, Francisco de Borja (Prince Esquilache), Count of Lemos, and the Count-Duke of Olivares.

Lope de Vega, in his comedy Primera parte de las dos famosas comedias de don Juan de Castro (1620–1625), dedicated verse XIX, 7 to "... don Juan Vicentelo y Toledo, Conde de Cantillana" (pp. 225–226).

Fernando de Vera y Mendoza, included Cantillana in his Panegyrico por la poesía (1627) of the poet nobles at the start of Philip IV's court in Madrid: "El Conde de Cantillana es de los que mejor imitan a Garcilaso". ["The Count of Cantillana is one of those that best emulates Garcilaso"].

In 1633, Cantillana was one of the nobles that Gabriel Bocángel commemorated in his Retrato Panegírico.

Likewise, Antonio de Solís dedicated a romance to Cantillana.

== An "incident at Palace" ==
In April 1636, Cantillana was sentenced to banishment for ten years to Oran, then under Spanish rule, for an "incident at palace", in the presence of the king, Philip IV and queen, Elisabeth. The incident originated in a row in December 1635 between the Count's son-in-law, the Marquis of Águila, whom Cantillana defended, and Juan de Herrera, like Cantillana, a knight of the Order of Santiago and groom to the Count-Duke of Olivares during a play.

That same month, Francisco de Quevedo, who had dedicated Juan de Herrera his Epicteto y Focilides enconsonantes castellanos (January 1634), mentioned the incident in a letter to his friend, the Duke of Medinaceli: "Yo he quedado sumamente lastimado con la desdicha, en la vida irreparable, de don Juan de Herrera: es un caso nunca oído ni visto en el mundo, con ruina de tantos".

As a result, Cantillana was arrested and imprisoned at Montánchez Castle. The sentence, together with the 10 years of banishment to Oran, where he was to personally serve together with four lanzas, at his own cost, each lanza being five soldiers fully armed and trained for combat, also included the prohibition from approaching less than 20 leagues of the Court for the rest of his life. Moreover, he had to pay a fine of 2,000 ducados and he lost his position as Gentleman of the Bedchamber to the Cardinal-Infante Ferdinand of Austria.

The Marquis of Águila was sentenced, in absentia, to death by beheading. Other participants in the incident, sentenced to lesser punishments were Juan de Herrera, banished to La Mamora, then, like Oran, under Spanish occupation; the Marquis of Govea; Count Sástago, as Captain of the Guarda, for not preventing the incident and for siding with the aggressors and the Marquis of Almaçán, for actually drawing his sword, when he came to the defence of Juan de Herrera on seeing the others put their hands to their swords, as well as the soldiers of the Guarda Españoles and the Guarda Alemanas.

In October 1638, the Duke of Medina Sidonia, acting on behalf of Cantillana, approached Olivares with the disgraced nobleman's offer to pay for 100 soldiers in return for the royal pardon. Olivares accepted the offer and submitted it to the Junta de Coroneles, which raised the number of soldiers to 500, to be delivered at Cartagena. Cantillana, in turn, offered 400 men plus four captains, to be delivered by February 1639. However, the Junta considered that the Count would be able to raise 500 troops, though they accepted that these could be delivered at Cádiz, as well as allowing him to sell an estate. By November 1638, Cantillana had raised almost 400 troops, and the remainder had been delivered by January 1640.
