= Francisco Agustín Tárrega =

Spanish poet

Francisco Agustín Tárrega (c. 1555 – 7 November 1602) was a Spanish clergyman, poet and playwright.

== Biography ==
After graduating in the Arts from the University of Valencia in 1575, he went on to obtain his doctorate in Canon law from the University of Salamanca in 1578.

Tárrega was of the co-founders, in 1591, of the Academia de los Nocturnos (Literary Society of the Night Revelers), one of the first academia literarias created in Spain, where he participated under the pseudonym of Miedo ('Fear').

== Works ==
As a participant of the Nocturnos, and writing under the pseudonym Miedo, Tárrega wrote several tens of poems and works of prose. His comedias, all dating from after the mid-1580s, were published posthumously, with El Prado de Valencia (The Meadow of Valencia) being a heroic drama and the remainder, cloak-and-sword plays.

=== Plays ===
- El Prado de Valencia (c. 1588 – 1590–91?)
- Las suertes trocadas y torneo venturoso
- La enemiga favorable (before 1606)
- La duquesa constante (1596?)
- El esposo fingido
- La fundación de la Orden de Nuestra Señora de la Merced (c. 1602)
