= Gaspar Aguilar =

Valencian poet and dramatist

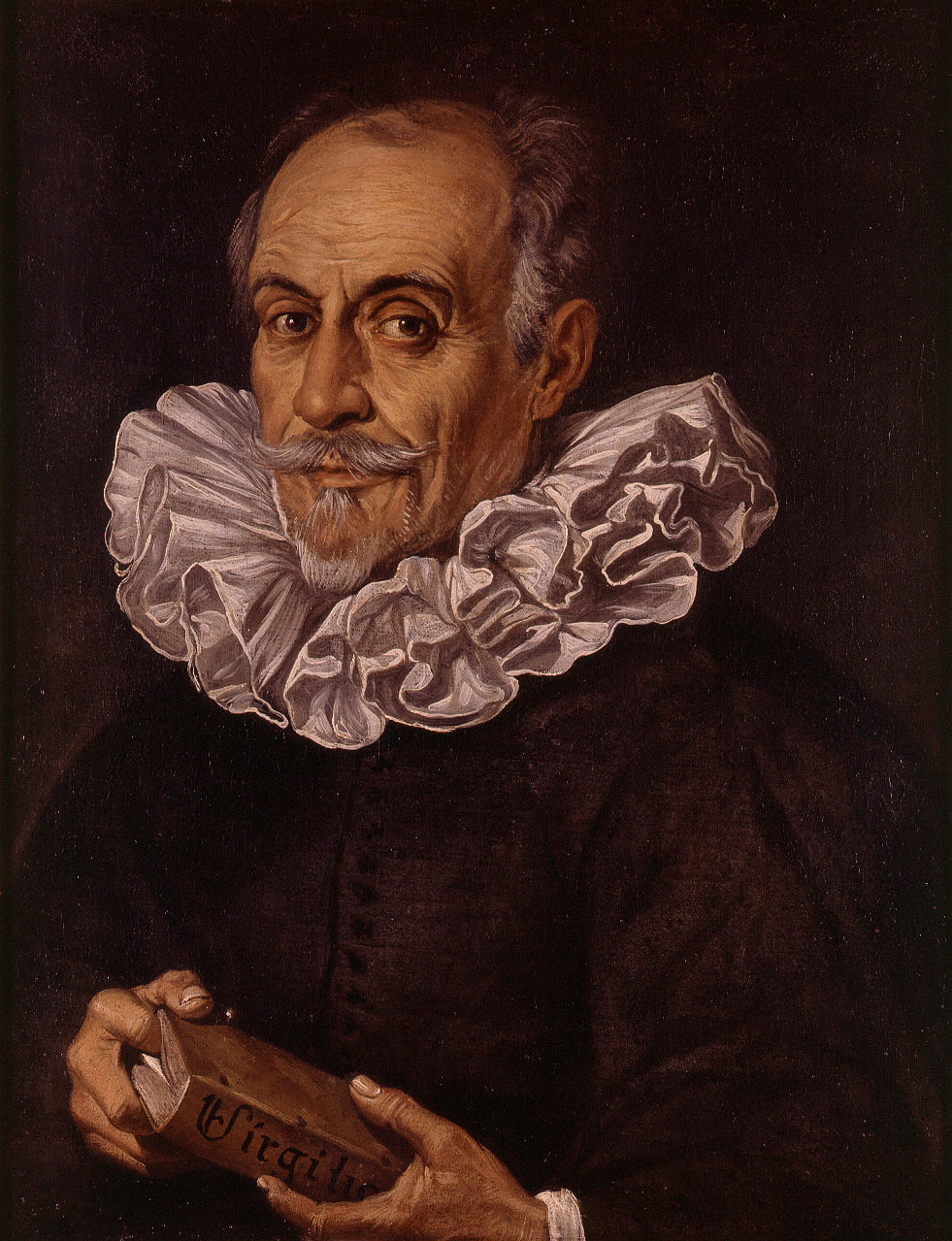
Portrait of the poet Gaspar de aguilar

Gaspar Aguilar (January 1561 – 25 July 1623) was a Valencian poet and dramatist of the Spanish Golden Age. Born in Valencia (Spain) into humble social conditions, he ended up frequenting the nobility as secretary of the Count of Sinarcas, and as steward to the Dukes of Gandia.

His poetry adapted itself to the needs and circumstances of his patrons: for religious festivals, celebrations and official events. He was one of the founders of l’Acadèmia dels Nocturns ("the Academy of Night"), for which he adopted the pen name of Sombra, meaning "Shade". In the Academy proceedings eight of his poems and four of his speeches are to be found.

Aguilar competed in a dozen poetry competitions in Valencia in the years 1592, 1606 and 1619. He is the author of the story Fiestes nuptciales ("Wedding Party", 1599), and of the anti-Morisco poem Expulsion de los moros en España ("Expulsion of the Moors from Spain", 1610).

His "new comedies" including 'La nuera humilde', 'La gitana melancolica' ("The Melancholic Gypsy") and 'Los amantes de Cartago' ("The Lovers of Carthage") stand out for their use of complex scenic resources. 'Les Rimas humanas i divinas' ("Rhymes Human and Divine") compiled well into the 17th century, is a compilation of his most important lyrical works.

Aguilar also wrote, in Valencian a song of praise for the work of Onafre Bartomeu Ginard (1608), and a work to celebrate the beatification of Archbishop Tomas de Villanueva (1619).<Diccionari de la Literatura Catalana, 2008>
