= Eudald Pradell =

Eudald Pradell (1721–1788) was a typographer. He was born in Ripoll in Catalonia, a little village below the Pyrenees, and belonged to a family of gunsmiths. Pradell learned the armourer's trade from his father and studied the craft of punchcutting.

He established his own workshop in Barcelona. Although he was illiterate, he produced one of the most admired typefaces ever cut in Spain. King Carlos III gave him a pension in order to provide new typefaces at the Imprenta Real in Madrid, where he eventually moved and set up his own foundry. By the time of his death, he was considered the leading punchcutter in Spain.
