= Francisco Pacheco (martyr) =

Portuguese missionary (1568–1626)

Blessed Francisco Pacheco
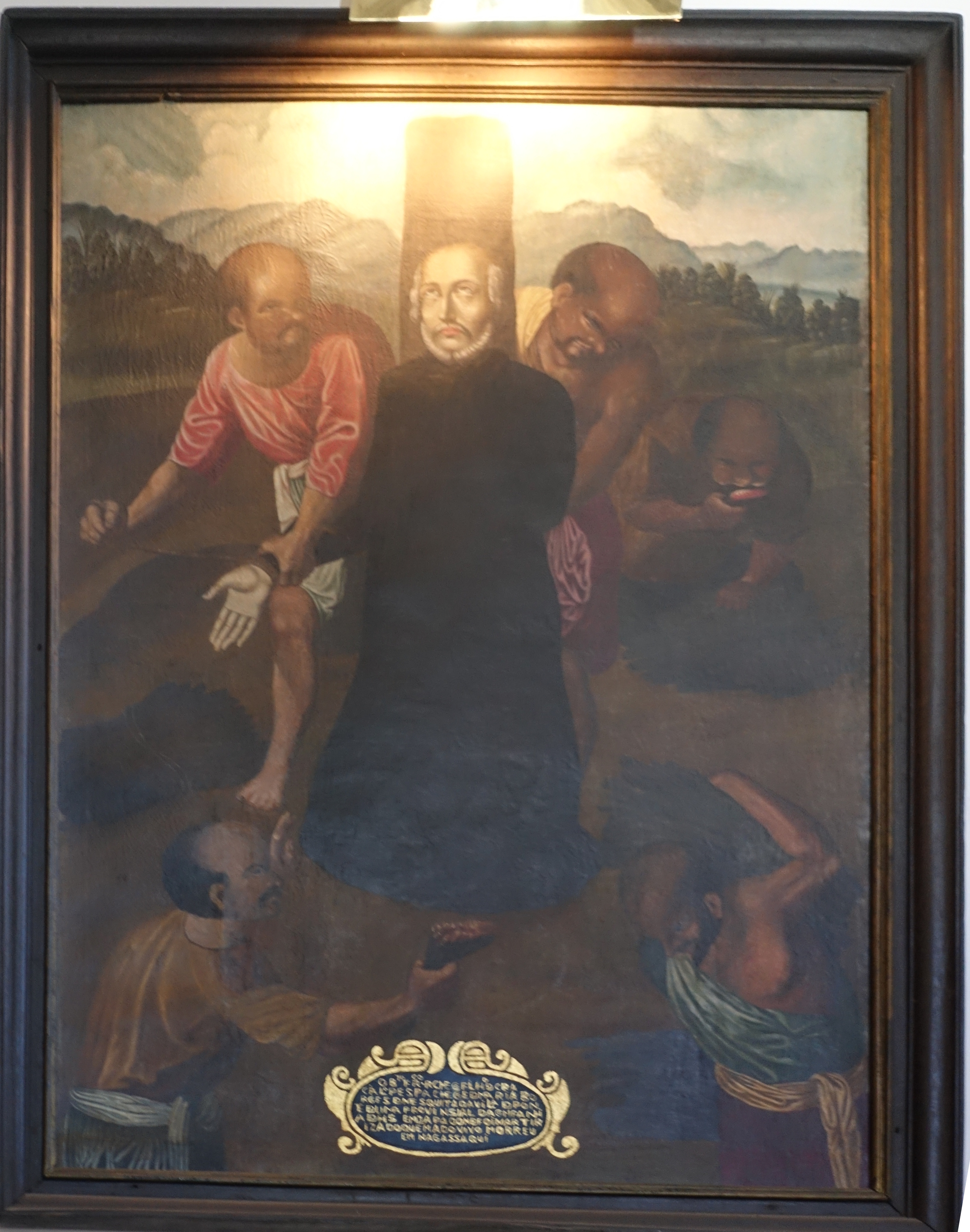
- Chapel of Our Lady of Pilar, where Francisco Pacheco is commemorated

Martyr
- Born: 1565; Ponte de Lima, Kingdom of Portugal
- Died: 1626; Nagasaki, Japan
- Venerated in: Catholic Church
- Beatified: 1867 by Pope Pius IX
- Feast: June 16

Francisco Pacheco (1565–1626) was a Portuguese Jesuit missionary and martyr executed in Japan during the religious persecutions against Catholics.

At only ten years old, upon learning that his uncle, Father Diogo de Mesquita—his mother's brother—had been martyred in Japan, he vowed to follow his example.

At the age of twenty, he entered the Society of Jesus in Coimbra, and in 1592 departed for the East. He was later ordained a priest in Goa.

By 1604 he was already in Japan, from where he had to flee twice due to the ongoing persecution. Eventually, he was captured and taken to Nagasaki, where he was burned alive. With him died two other Jesuit priests, João Baptista Zola and Baltazar de Torres, as well as several catechists, three families accused of having sheltered him, and a young boy named Luís.

They were beatified in 1867 by Pope Pius IX.
