= Juan de Dueñas =

15th-century Spanish poet and soldier

Juan de Dueñas (c. 1400 – before 1460) was a Spanish poet and soldier. He is considered, along with Francisco de Osuna and others, one of the first Spanish mystics, "forerunners" of those in the 16th century.

== Early career ==
Although not much is known about his date and place of birth, with researchers debating whether it was Castille or Navarre, it is, however, known that he was at the Court of King John II of Castile, as a lower-ranking noble, until the end of the 1520s, when he was either banished or went into self-exile.

While still at Court, he dedicated several poems to the King and to other major figures of the Court, including the Marquis of Santillana, whom he considered a friend. Some of his poems go so far as to give advice to the king and even criticise him and his favourite, Álvaro de Luna, the powerful Constable of Castile.

=== Years in exile ===
In the historical context of an increasingly hostile anti-Jewish sentiment, some of the coplas he dedicated to the King showed a very negative attitude towards Jews and conversos and his criticism reached Álvaro de Luna, which may explain his abandoning the Court, and offering his services to Courts of Aragon and Navarre, where he was active from 1429. In fact, at that time, the Marquis of Santillana had written some very scathing verses, Dezir contra los aragoneses, which became very popular, criticising Aragon and Navarre, to which Juan de Dueñas replied immediately stating his political position in Coplas.... sobre razones que dezian algunos mançebos de Castilla, and during the war between the crowns of Castile and Aragon (1429–1430), Dueñas actually confronted the Marquis in a skirmish on the border, with the Marquis having to flee to avoid capture. In his Coplas... al Señor Rey... suplicándole por tres dueñas" [Coplas... addressed to the King... imploring him on behalf of three Ladies], an allegory in which he narrates a dream he had after abandoning the King's court, three Ladies—Justice, Peace and Clemency, all dressed in mourning, explain to the dreamer that they are scorned at Court.

==== Aragonese conquest of Naples ====
Although Juan de Dueñas may have participated at the Battle of Ponza, he certainly participated at the siege of Naples in 1437, during the Aragonese conquest of Naples, where he was taken prisoner. During his captivity, he composed his famous Nao de Amor, in which he seems to beg forgiveness of King Juan.

=== Return to the Peninsula ===
However, as soon as he was released, he returned to the service of Alfonso V of Aragon, as custodian of arms, not returning to the Peninsula until 1439. The relations between Castile, Aragon and Navarre now having improved, Juan de Dueñas requests King Alfonso to intercede with King Juan to obtain a pardon for Dueñas to return to Castile after ten years of absence. Not much is known after that, except for a poem in which he tells the King that, as an old man, he is no longer able to serve him and refers to the good relationship they had in the past.

== Works ==
Two of his poems, both pre-1445, make references to Arthurian characters: Iseult and Tristan in "Vi, señora, una carta" (in Cancionero de Palacio, 1437-1443) and the Prophecies of Merlin, in "El Sol claro la luna escuresca" (in Cancionero de San Román, 1454).

- Coplas.... sobre razones que dezian algunos mançebos de Castilla (c. 1429)
- Coplas... al Señor Rey... suplicándole por tres dueñas" (c. 1429)
- Nao de Amor (c. 1437)
- "Vi, señora, una carta" (in Cancionero de Palacio, 1437-1443)
- "El Sol claro la luna escuresca" (in Cancionero de San Román, 1454)
