= Juan de Arguijo =

Juan de Arguijo (1567–1623) was a Spanish writer, poet and musician belonging to the Spanish Golden Age during the Baroque period.

Juan de Arguijo was born into a wealthy family of Seville. He mostly wrote under the pen name of Arcicio. His poetry was markedly different from the other poets of his time, known for its cerebral quality and for the poet's striving for perfectionism. His letters are also valued as literary gems, and a number of them were collected and published. Many of his sonnets were regarded by critics to be superior to those of Quevedo, Lope and Argensola.

== Bibliography ==
- Arguijo, Don Juan de (2009). Complete Poetry. Madrid, Cátedra. ISBN 978-84-376-2517-1.
