= Lupercio Leonardo de Argensola =

Spanish dramatist and poet (1559–1613)

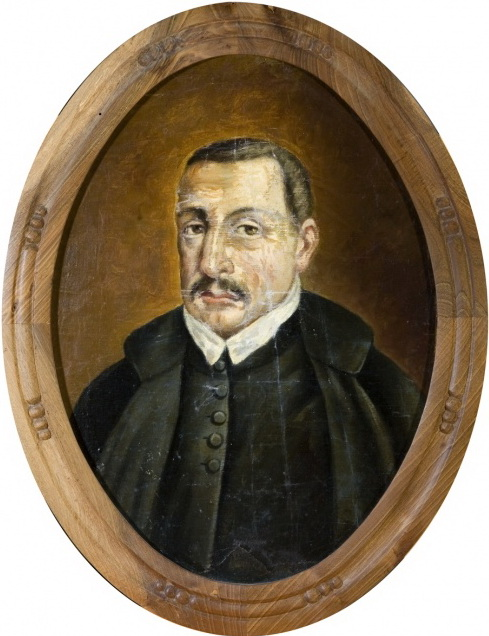
Lupercio Leonardo de Argensola.

Lupercio Leonardo de Argensola (baptised 14 December 1559 – 2 March 1613) was a Spanish dramatist and poet.

== Biography ==
He was born in Barbastro. He was educated at the universities of Huesca and Zaragoza, becoming secretary to Fernando de Gurrea y Aragón, 5th Duke de Villahermosa in 1585. He was appointed historiographer of Aragon in 1599, and in 1610 accompanied the count de Lemos to Naples, where he died in March 1613.

His tragedies—Fills, Isabela and Alejandra—are said by Cervantes to have "filled all who heard them with admiration, delight and interest". Filis is lost, and Isabela and Alejandra, which were not printed until 1772, are imitations of Seneca.

Argensola's poems were published with those of his brother, Bartolomé Leonardo de Argensola, in 1634; they consist of translations from the Latin poets, and of original satires. He translated and imitated Horace, and modelled his austere style on that of Luis de León. He and his brother (... 'come to reform the Castilian tongue', said Lope) stood for a Malherbe-like sobriety, soon swept aside by culteranismo.
