= Baltasar del Alcázar =

Spanish poet

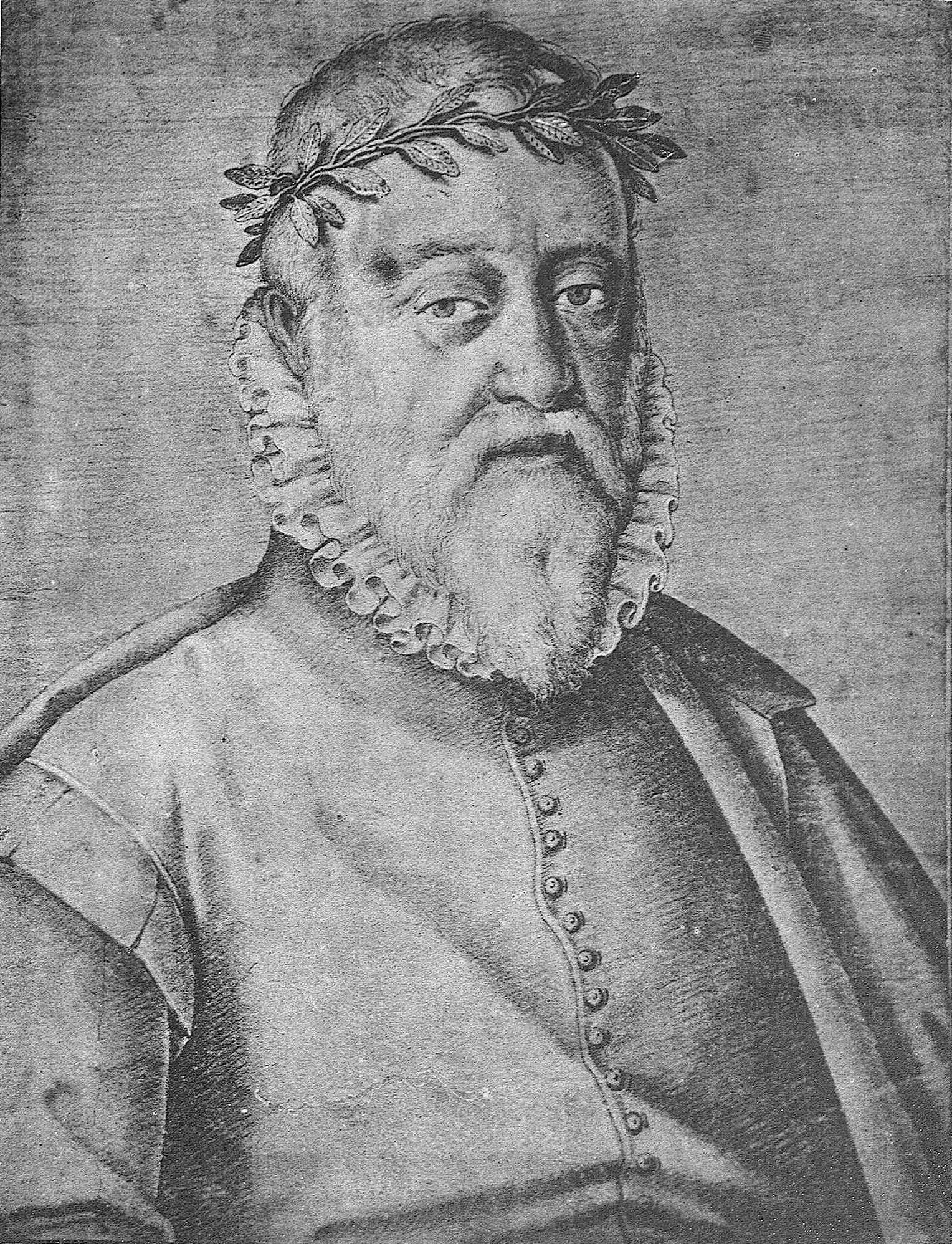
Baltasar del Alcázar

Baltasar del Alcázar (1530 in Seville, Spain–16 February 1606 in Ronda) was a Spanish poet. He was the sixth child of Luis del Alcázar. His poetry was about life and love, most of it spiced with a keen sense of humor.

== Works ==
A short example of his poetry is Tres Cosas (Three Things):

Tres cosas me tienen preso
de amores el corafzón.
La bella Inés, el jamón
y berenjenas con queso.

Translation:

Three things have caught my heart:

The pretty Inés, cured ham
and aubergines with cheese.

=== Epigrams ===
- A un giboso de delante
- A una mujer escuálida
- Constanza
- Dios nos guarde
- Doña Valentina
- El estudiante (The Student)
- Hiere la hermosa Elvira...
- Entraron en una danza... (El baile)
- Job
- La capa (The Hat)
- La nariz de Clara
- Los ojos de Ana
- Salir por pies
- Preso de amores
- Su modo de vivir en la vejez
- Una cena jocosa
- Yo acuerdo revelaros un secreto.

=== Sonnets ===
- A Cristo
- Al amor
- Cercada está mi alma de contrarios
- Di, rapaz mentiroso.

=== Other ===
- Cena jocosa
- Diálogo entre dos perrillos
- Diálogo entre un galán y el eco
- Consejos a una viuda.
