= Francisco Pacheco =

Spanish painter and teacher (1564-1644)

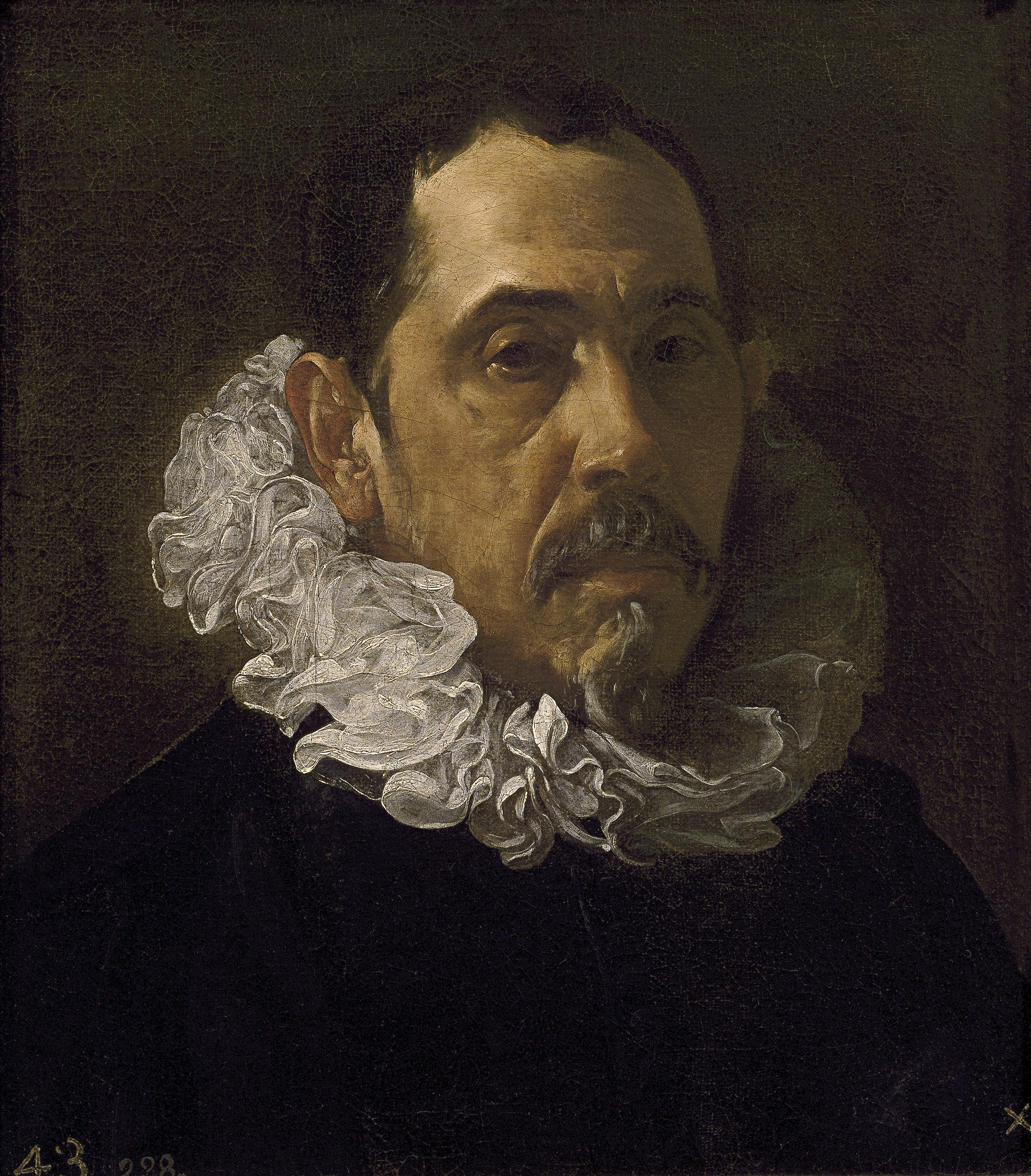
Portrait of Francisco Pacheco (1622) by Diego Velázquez

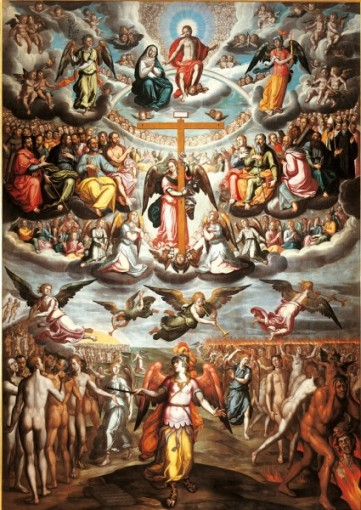
Francisco Pacheco, Lo Judici Final ("The Last Judgment"), Musée Goya, Castres, France.

Francisco Pérez del Río (bap. 3 November 1564 – 27 November 1644), known by his pseudonym Francisco Pacheco, was a Spanish painter, best known as the teacher of Alonso Cano and Diego Velázquez, as well as the latter's father-in-law. His textbook on painting, entitled Art of Painting, published posthumously, is an important source for the study of 17th-century practice in Spain. He is described by some as the "Vasari of Seville": vocal and didactic about his theories of painting and thoughts about painters, conventional and uninspired in his executions.

== Early life ==
He was born at Sanlúcar de Barrameda, son of Juan Pérez and Leonor del Río, and moved to Seville shortly before 1580, adopting the name of his uncle, Francisco Pacheco, the Dean of Seville Cathedral. As a student of Luis Fernández, he did much of his learning by copying works of the Italian masters.

He married María del Páramo in 1594. The couple had one daughter, Juana Pacheco (1 June 1602 – 10 August 1660).

== Career ==
In 1559 he commenced work on his Libro de los retratos.

His first known painting is from 1589, Cristo con la Cruz a cuestas, which belonged to the Ybarra collection in Seville, although its current whereabouts is unknown. The following year he painted La Virgen de Belén, conserved in Granada Cathedral, and which is an exact copy of Marcellus Coffermans' original.

From around 1594, together with Alonso Vázquez, with whom he collaborated, Pacheco was one of the most sought-after painters in Seville, until the arrival of Juan de Roelas in 1604.

In 1610, he visited Madrid, where he met Vicente Carducho and Toledo, where he met El Greco. On his return to Seville, his art school took on as a student a 12-year-old Diego Velázquez, who was a student in Pacheco's school for six years, and married Pacheco's daughter Juana on 23 April 1618. In 1616, when Velázquez was about to finish his studies, Alonso Cano started studying with Pacheco.

Pacheco's school emphasized the academically correct representation of religious subjects, not least because he was the official censor of Seville's Inquisition. His own work reflects those constraints; paintings such as the Last Judgment (convent of Santa Isabel) and Martyrs of Granada are monumental in scale but unimaginative in treatment.

In 1630, he started work on Arte de la pintura, finishing it in 1641. It was published posthumously in 1649.

== Gallery ==
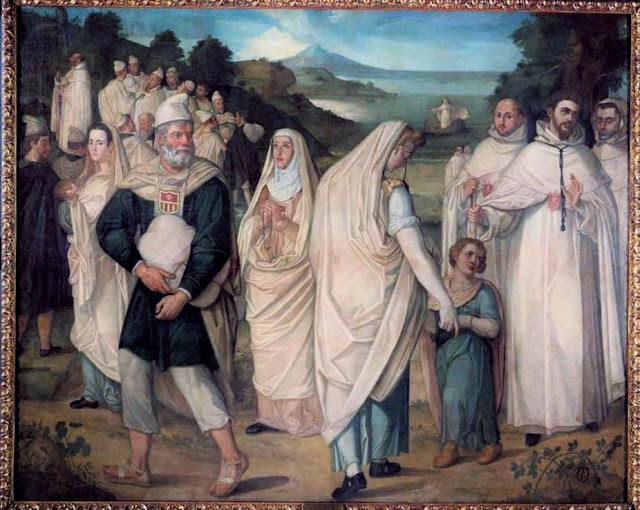
Mercedarians Ransoming Christian Captives (1600)

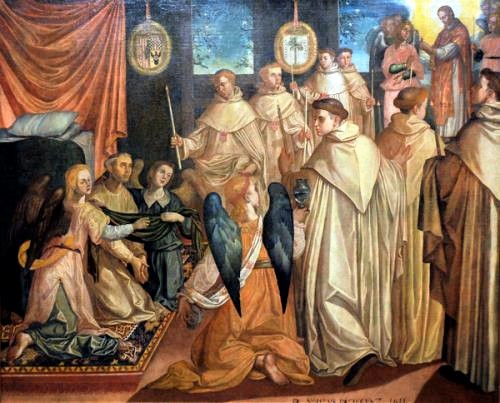
Last Communion of St. Raymond Nonnatus (1611)

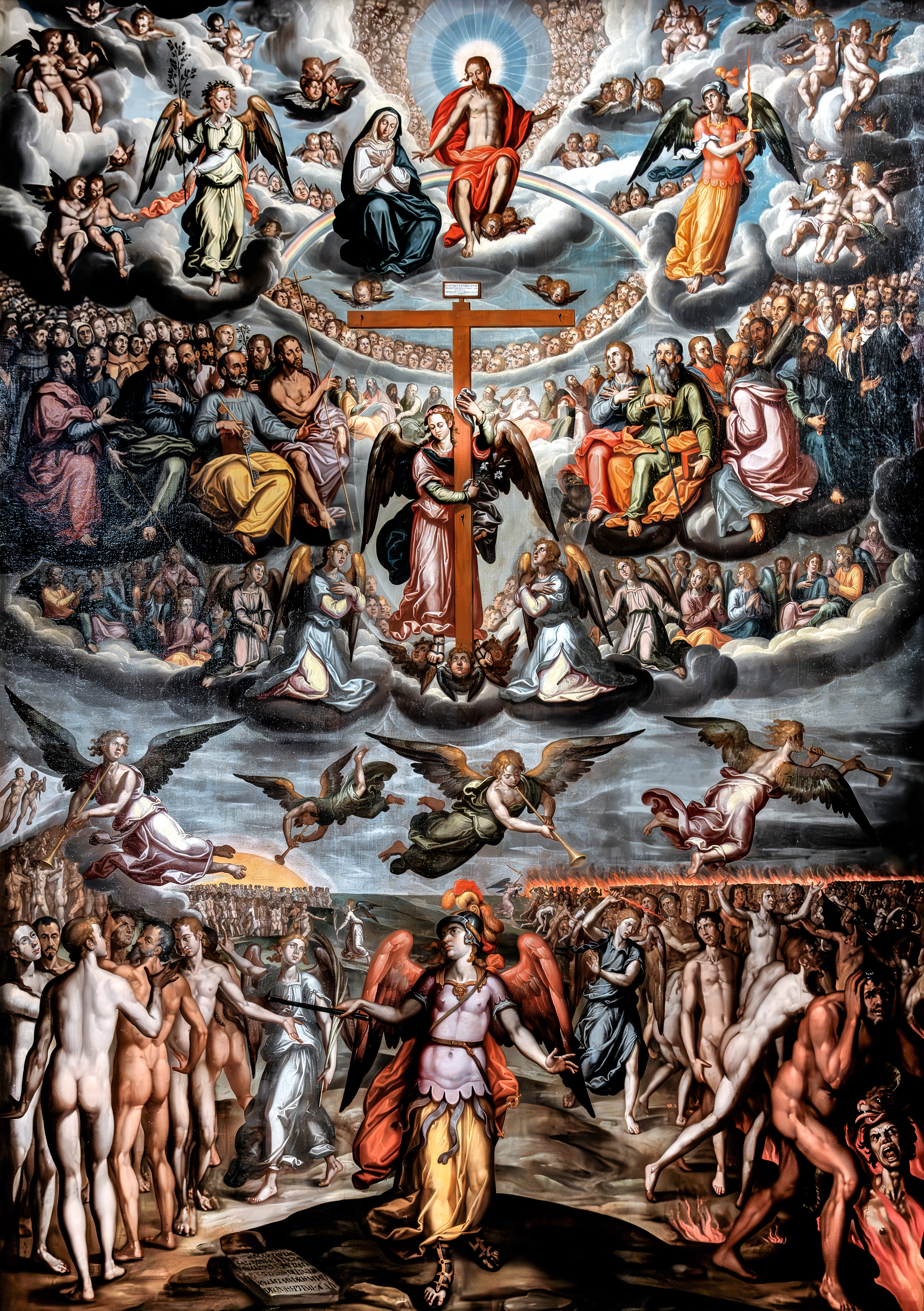
The Last Judgment (1614), Goya Museum.

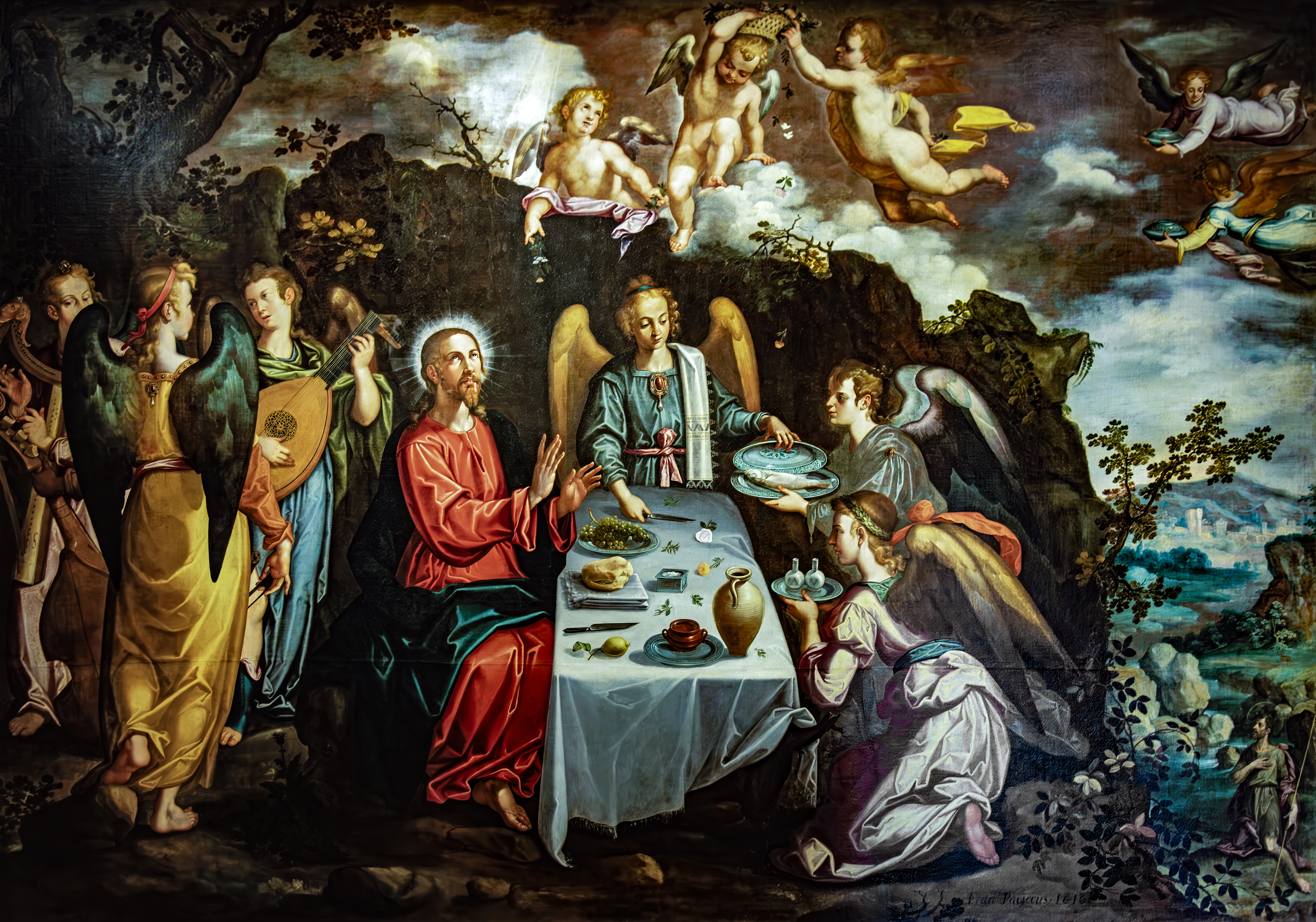
Christ served by angels in the desert (1616)

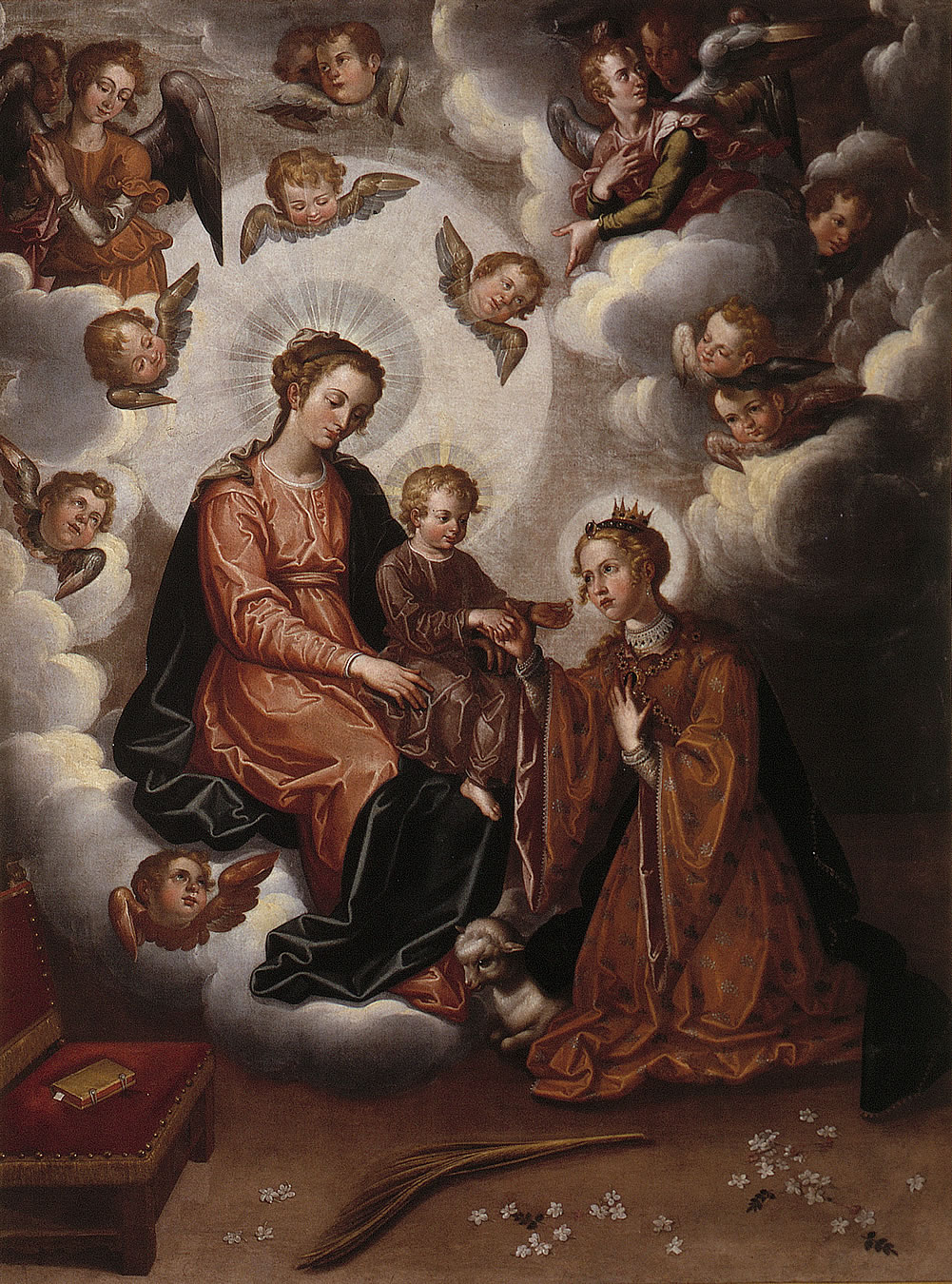
Mystic Marriage of Saint Agnes (1628)

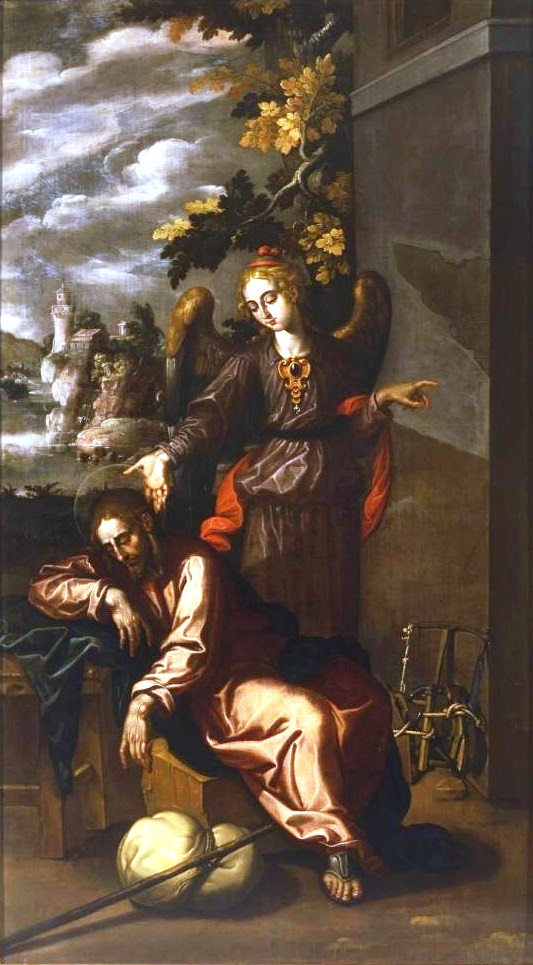
Dream of Saint Joseph (circa 1617 – 1620)

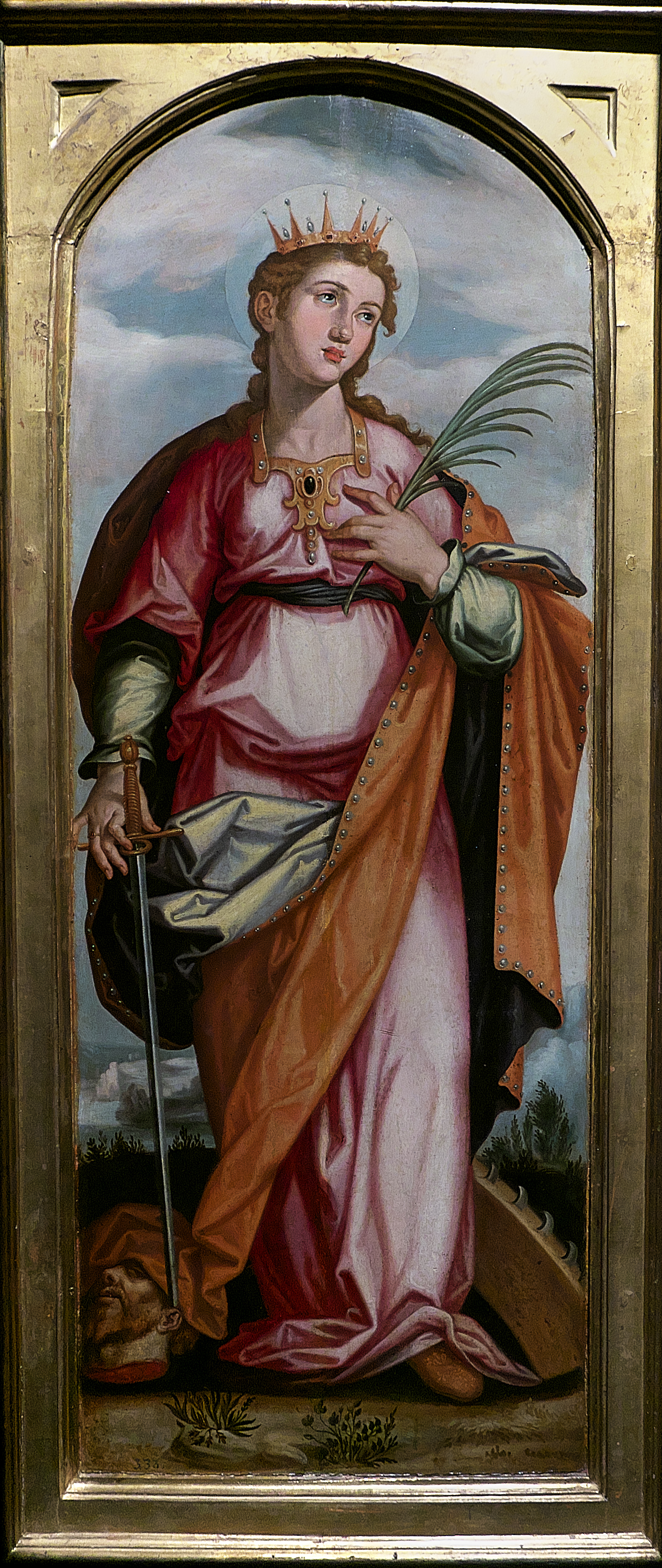
Santa Catalina (Saint Katherine)

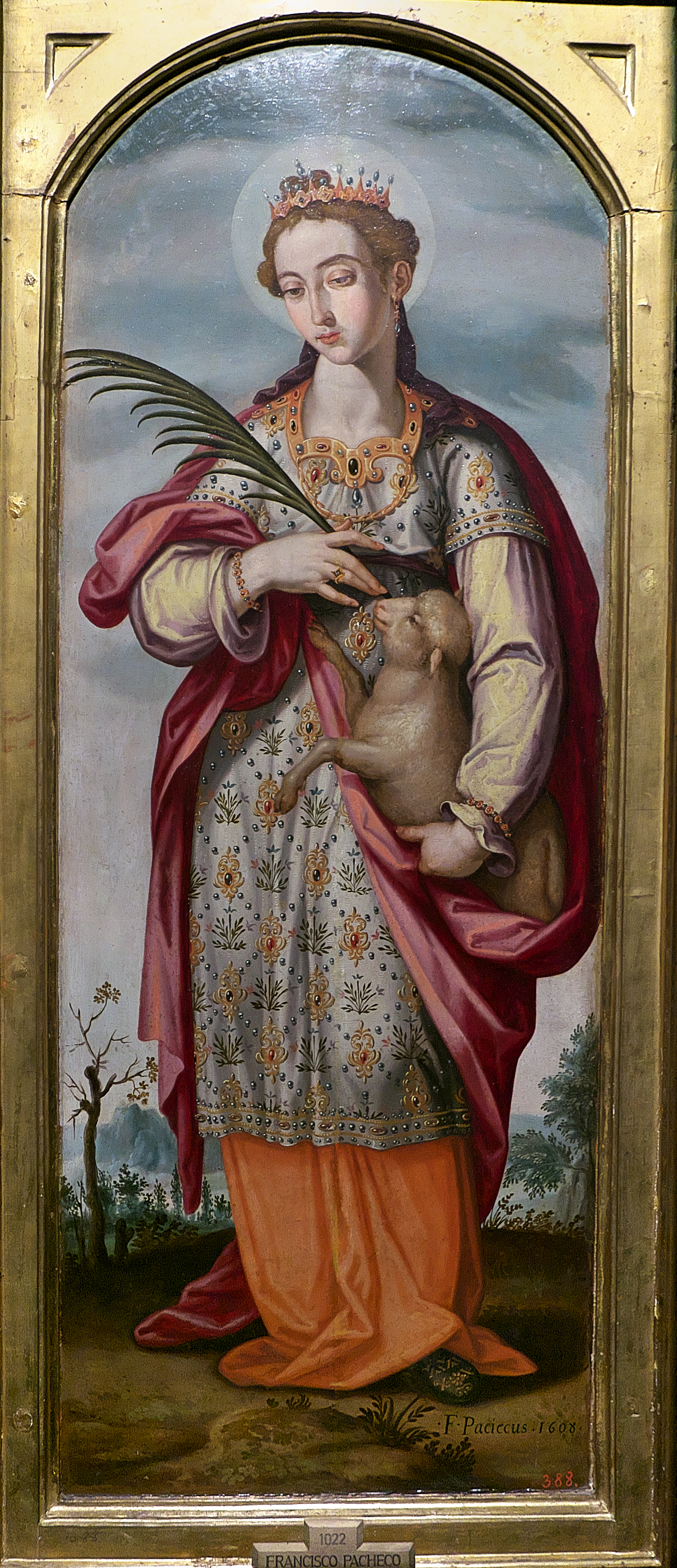
Santa Inés (Saint Agnes)

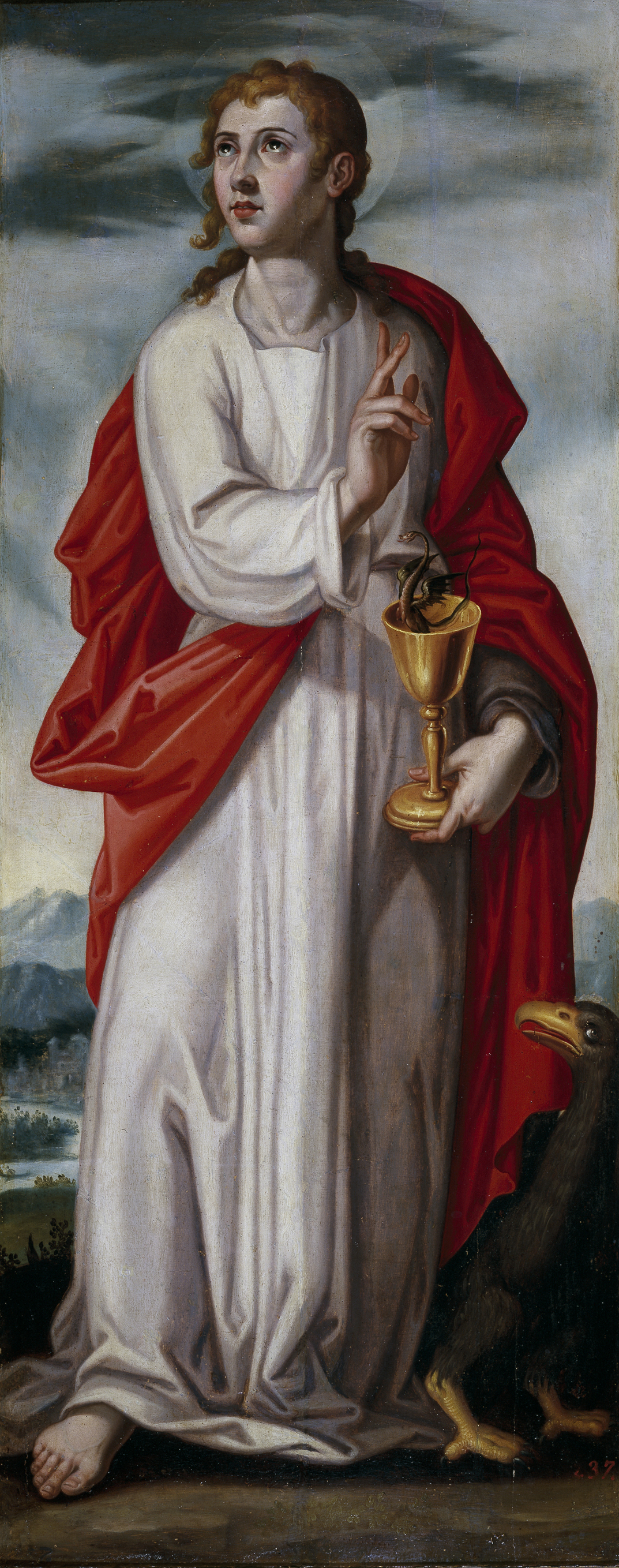
San Juan Evangelista (Saint John the Evangelist)

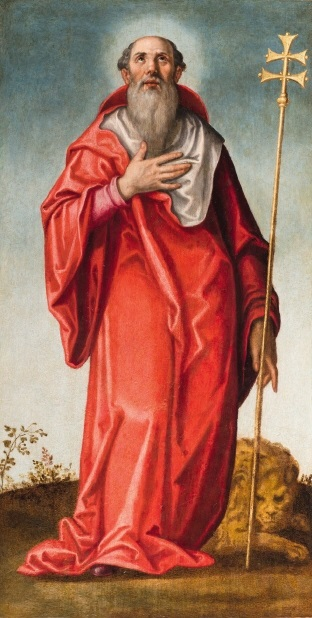
San Jerónimo (Saint Geronimo)

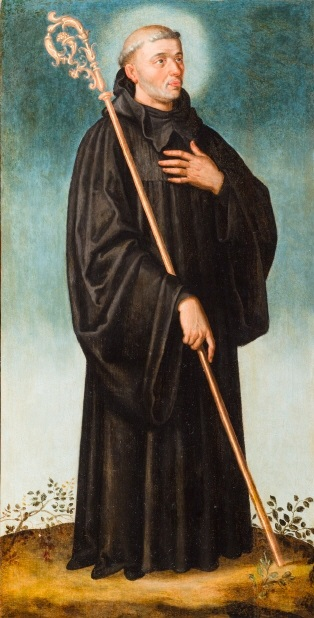
San Benito Abad (Saint Benedict Abbot)

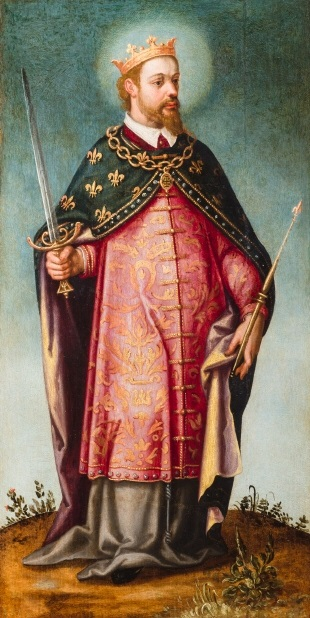
San Luis, rey de Francia (Saint Louis, King of France)

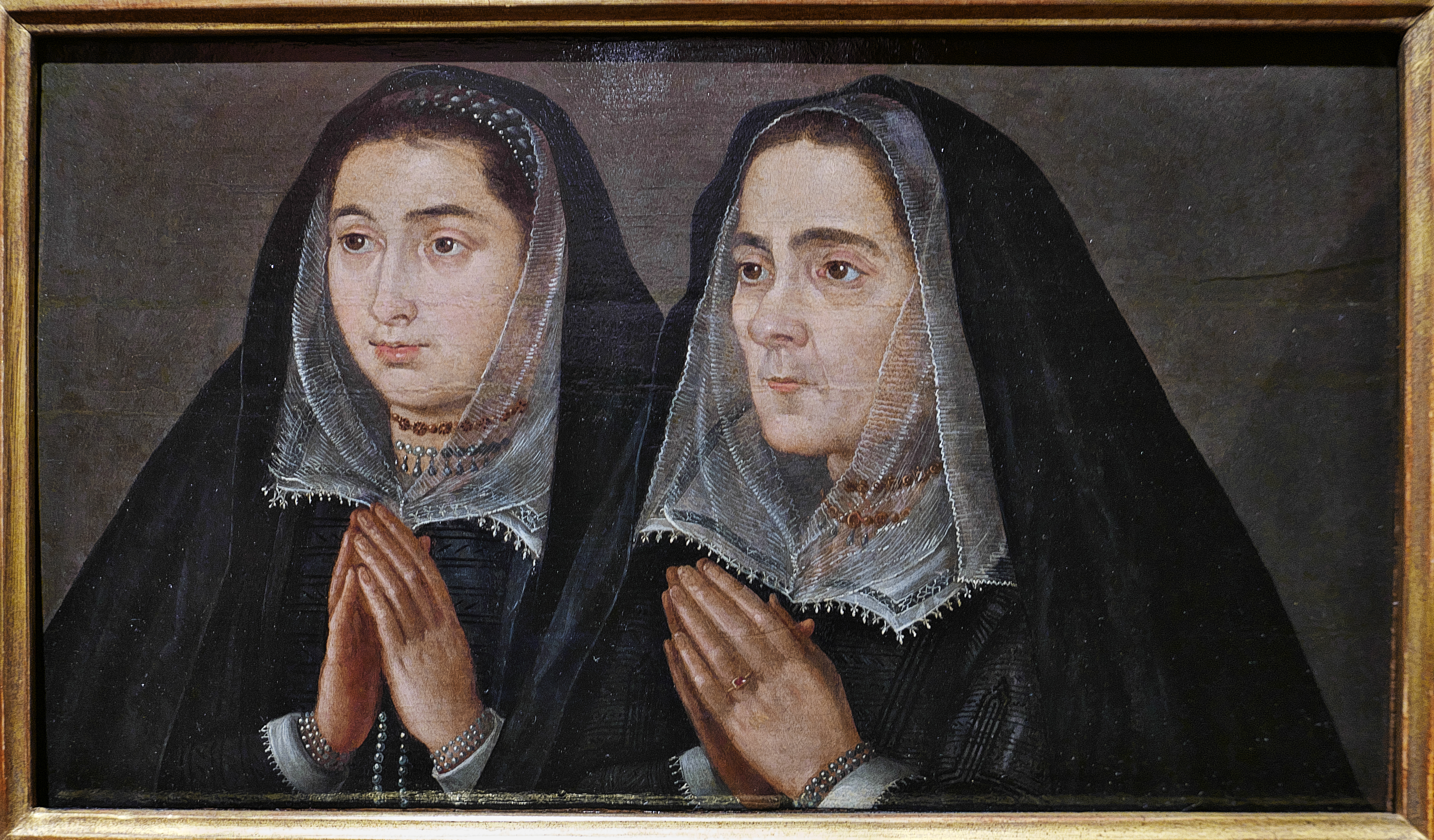
Portrait of Miguel Jerónimo's wife and his daughter

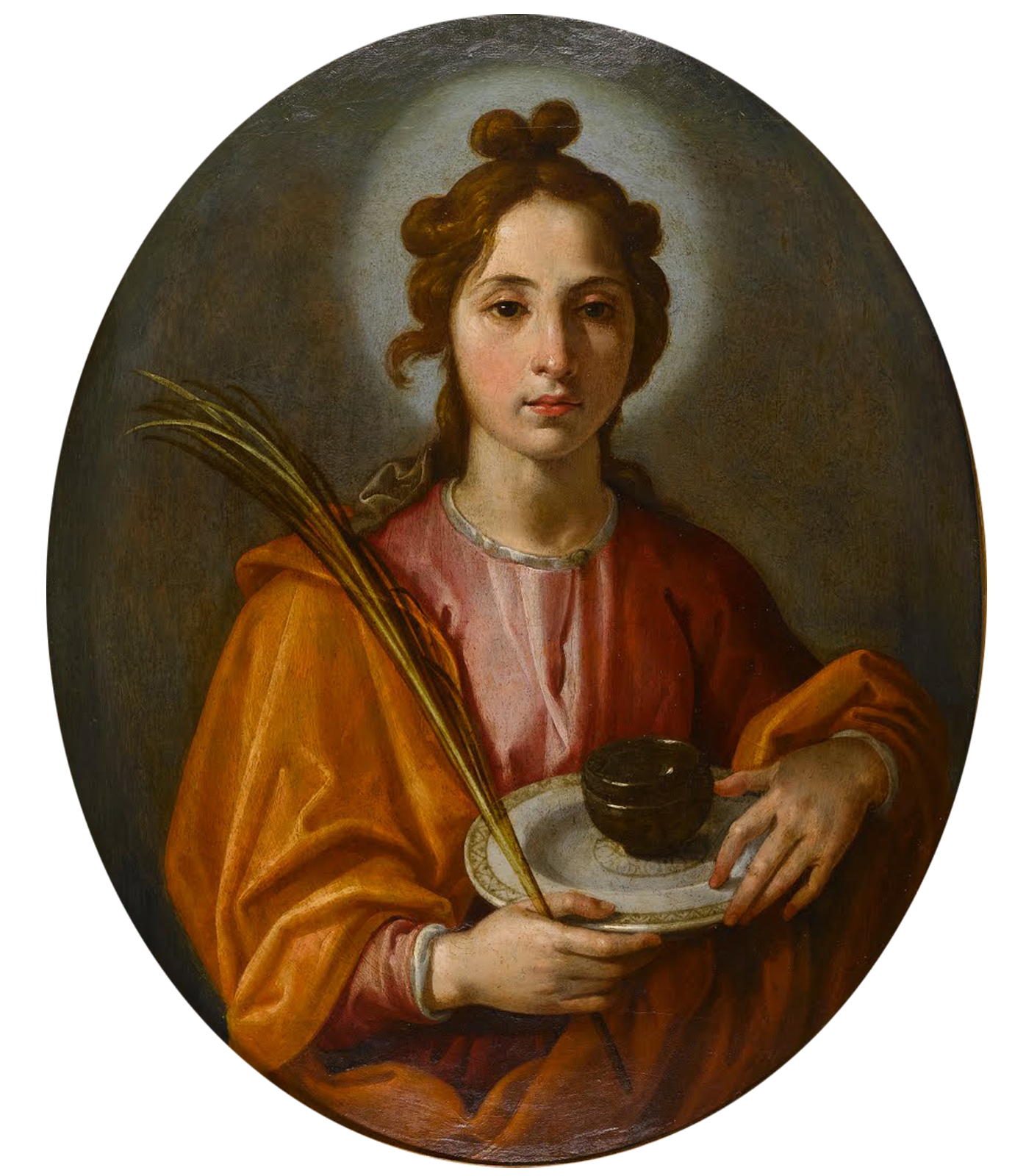
Santa Justa (Saint Justa)

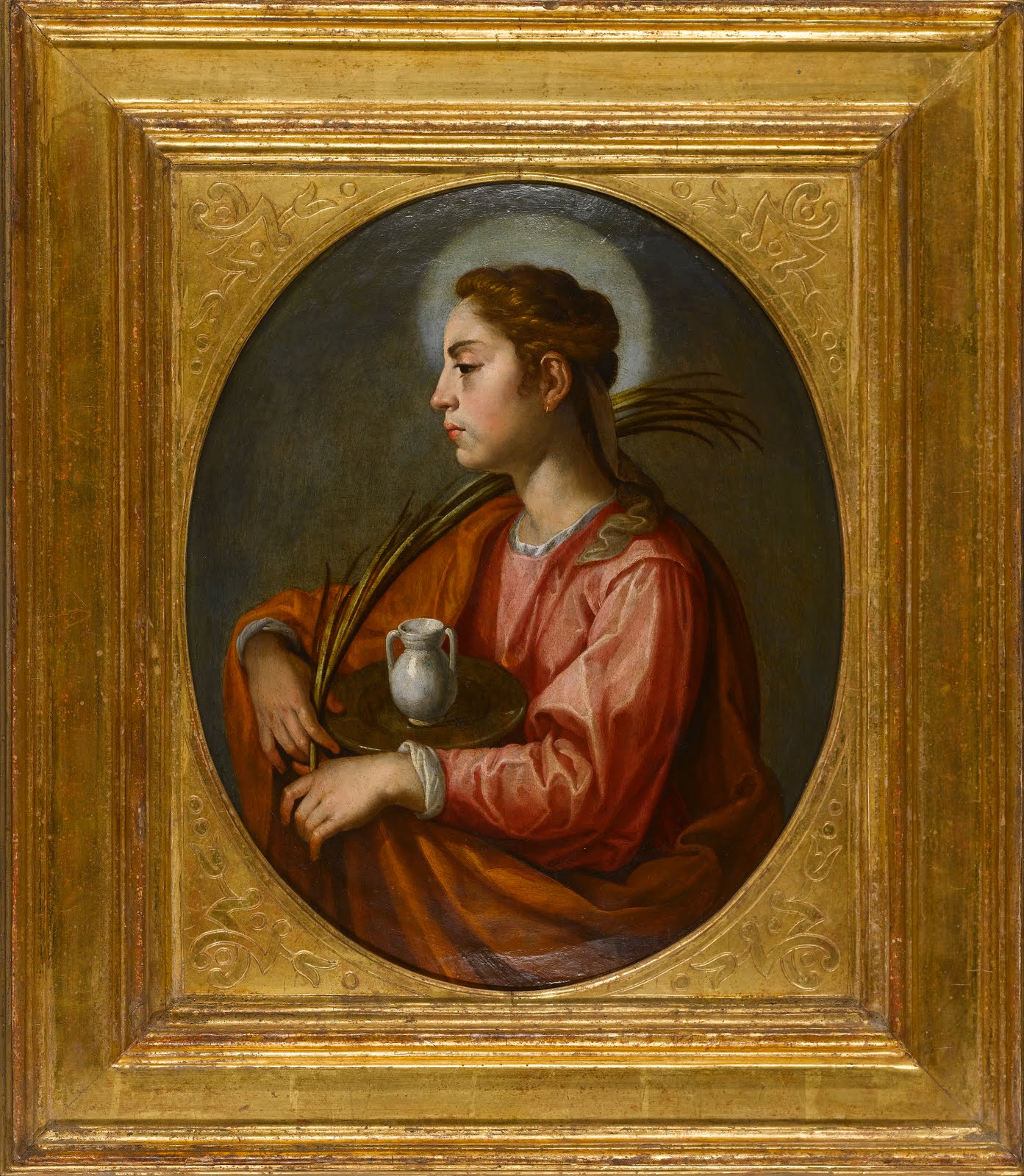
Santa Rufina (Saint Rufina)
