= Fernando de Herrera =

Spanish poet and man of letters

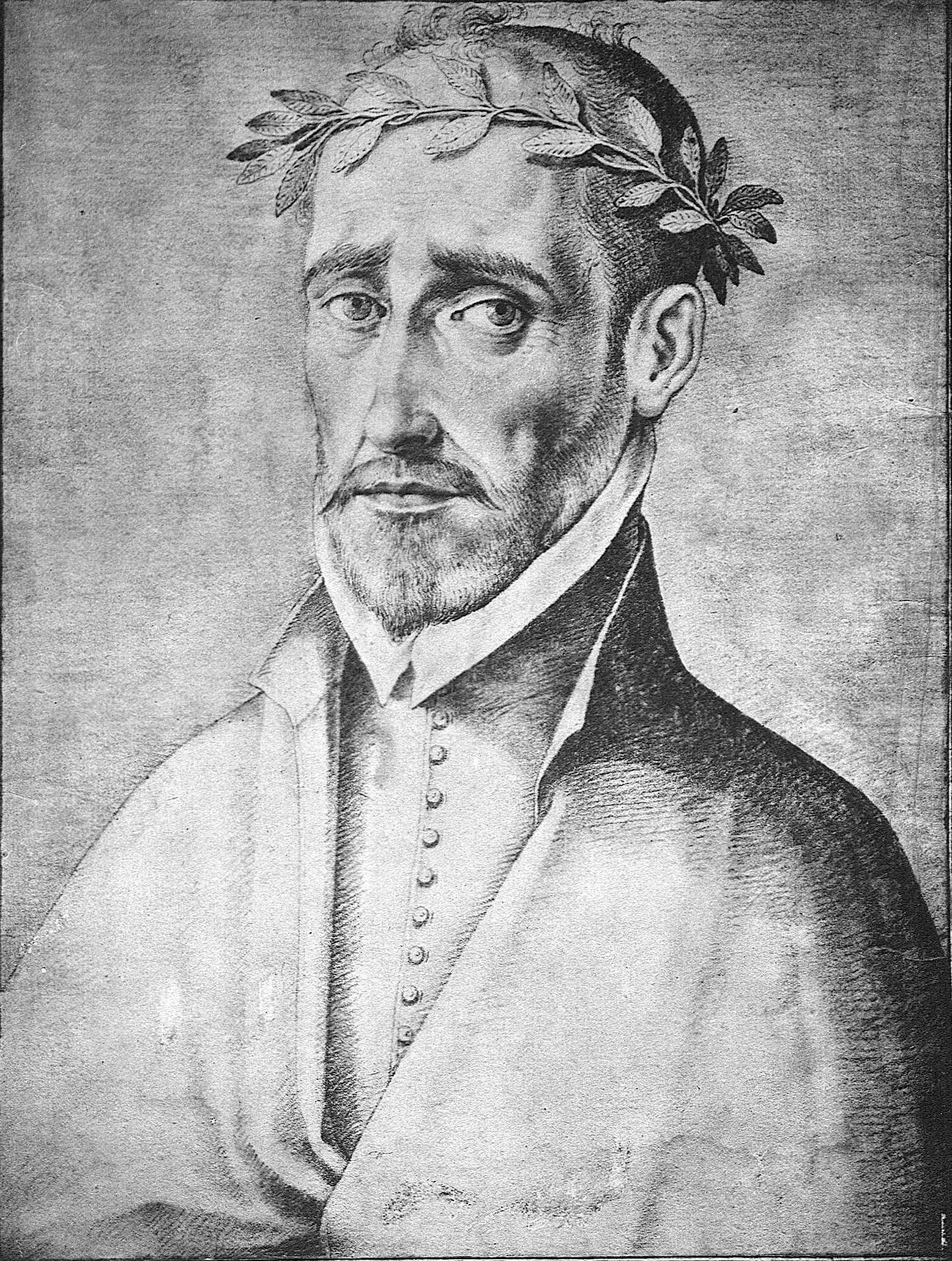
Portrait of Fernando de Herrera (1599) by Francisco Pacheco.

Fernando de Herrera (~1534–1597), called "El Divino", was a 16th-century Spanish poet and man of letters. He was born in Seville. Much of what is known about him comes from Libro de descripción de verdaderos retratos de illustres y memorables varones (Book of the Description of the True Portraits of Illustrious and Memorable Men) (1599) by Francisco Pacheco.

== Biography ==
Although Herrera's family was only moderately wealthy, they were highly esteemed in Seville. During Herrera's lifetime, Seville was a bustling port city from which many transatlantic voyages would embark, and trading took place with countries all over the world. It was the most cosmopolitan city in Spain, This active atmosphere, however, was somewhat incompatible with Herrera's personality. He therefore sought solace from the busy city life through his poetry. However, whereas spending much of his time in seclusion allowed him to concentrate on his work and artistic interests, it also brought him much criticism from others. The academic community, especially Rodrigo Caro and Juan Gutiérrez Rufo, mocked him for his unorthodox ways.

Although well-learned and knowledgeable — Herrera was a great admirer of Italian poetry, the classics, and the Bible (all of which influenced his work) — he was never known to have held any academic degree. He admired one Spanish poet in particular, Garcilaso de la Vega, whose style influenced his own poetry. Herrera did not just have an antiquarian interest in knowledge, however; he was interested in current events, especially those related to the military. Evidence of this is seen in his patriotic canciones (songs) in which he expresses feelings toward contemporary military leaders and actions.

To accommodate his need for refuge, Herrera took minor orders in the Catholic Church and received a benefice in San Andrés, a parish of Seville. However, though Herrera displayed a love for solitude, he was no hermit. Around 1559, he struck up a friendship with Don Álvaro Colón y Portugal, Count of Gelves, and his wife, Doña Leonor de Milán de Córdoba y Aragón. Herrera was frequently invited by the count to attend his tertulia (literary salon), a meeting of an elite literary circle where he would form many friendships with local poets, men of letters, painters, and artists. It was his relationship with Doña Leonor that provided Herrera with his muse. Herrera's love for Doña Leonor inspired his love poems. However, they were never enough to provoke the same feelings in her.

After the death of Leonor in 1581, Herrera lost his desire to write further love poetry. In addition, the death of the count in 1582 ended his attendance at the disbanded literary tertulia at the palace. Henceforth, Herrera devoted himself to two major projects: a history of the world up to the death of Charles V and a biography of Thomas More. The writer continued to work up to his death in 1597 at the age of 63.

== Works ==
=== Poetry ===
Herrera's meticulous study and eventual mastery of poetic discourse earned him the name "el Divino" ("the divine one"), a name given him by Miguel de Cervantes, author of Don Quixote. In addition, his knowledge of poetic topics helped him to become one of the leaders of the school of poets to which Herrera belonged in Seville.

The works of Herrera cover a wide range of subjects, representing his large span of knowledge and interests. Herrera's military poetry (his canciones, or songs), for example, are accounts of contemporary military leaders and events in which Herrera demonstrates his patriotism, loyalty to the Christian faith, and respect for great leaders. Three poems concerning this theme include Canción por la Victoria del Señor don Juan (Ode to the Victory of Don Juan), written in 1572, where patriotism is displayed in praising the work done by the Spanish navy at the Battle of Lepanto in 1571; Canción al señor don Juan de Austria vencedor de los moriscos en las Alpujarras (Ode to Don Juan de Austria, Conqueror of the Moors in the Alpujarras), written in 1571, where Herrera celebrates a leader who stopped a Muslim revolt between 1568 and 1571; and Canción por la pérdida del Rei don Sebastián (Ode to the Defeat of King Sebastian), written in 1579, where the poet commemorates the death of a Portuguese king.

Herrera's love poetry inspired by his muse, the Countess of Gelves, can be divided into two periods. The first, "Rimas Juventiles" (Youthful Rhymes), is defined by Herrera's description of love as a blissful state, in which there is neither pain nor suffering; in this state, even the impossible can happen. In the second period, love escapes reality and lives in a world of fantasy and perfection. To this period belongs the "Poesías" (Poems), a body of poetry, published in successive editions.

A third major area of Herrera's work, and one for which he is best known, is related to Garcilaso de la Vega, the Spanish poet and author whom Herrera held in the highest esteem. One of Herrera's most famous works, Obras de Garci Lasso con anotaciones de Fernando de Herrera al ilustrissimo i ecelentissimo Señor don Antonio de Guzman, Marques de Ayamonte, Governador del Estado de Milan, i Capitan General de Italia (Works of Gracilaso de la Vega with Comments by Fernando de Herrera to the Most Illustrious and Excellent Don Antonio de Guzman, Marques of Ayamonte, Governor of the State of Milan, and Captain General of Italy), written in 1580, displays not only Herrera's admiration for Garcilaso's poetry but also his mastery of the intricate details of said poet's rhythm, choice and order of words, coherency, meter, and the effects they have on the poem as a whole. It is this knowledge which drove Herrera to devote such meticulous attention to his own work.

=== Other works ===
Other examples of Herrera's work include the translation of Latin and Italian works into Castilian, a biography of Thomas More, and a history of the world. Some of his most well-known works are:

- Relacion de la guerra de Chipre y sucesso de la batalla Naual de Lepanto Escrito por Fernando de Herrera, dirigido al ilustrissimo y excelentissimo dõ Alõso Perez de Guzman el Bueno, Duque de Medina Sidonia y Conde de Niebla. Seville: Alonso Picardo, written in 1572, which includes Cancion en Alabanza de la Diuina Magestad por la vitoria del Señor don Juan.
- Algunas obras de Fernando de Herrera al illustriss. S.D. Fernando Enriquez de Ribera Marques de Tarifa. Seville: Printed by Andrea Pescioni, 1582.
- Tomás Moro de Fernando de Herrera al ilustrissimo Señor don Rodrigo de Castro Cardenal y Arzobispo de Sevilla. Seville: Alonso de la Barrera, 1592.
- Versos de Fernando de Herrera Emendados y divididos por el en tres libros: A don Gaspar de Guzmán, Conde de Olivares, Gentilhombre de la Cámara del Príncipe nuestro Señor, Alcaide de los Alcazares Reales de Sevilla y Comendador de Bivoras en la Orden de Calatrava. Seville: Gabriel Ramos Vejarano, 1619.
- Rimas de Fernando de Herrera, 2 volumes. Madrid: Imprenta Real, 1786.
- Poesías, edited by García de Diego. Madrid: "La Lectura," 1914.
- Obras de Garci Lasso de la Vega con anotaciones de Fernando de Herrera al ilutrissimo i ecelentissimo Señor don Antonio de Guzman, Marques de Ayamonte, Governador del Estado de Milan, i Capitan General de Italia. Seville: Alonso de la Barrera, 1580.
