= Baldwin RP-210 =

Class of Diesel-Electric locomotives

Baldwin-Lima-Hamilton RP-210
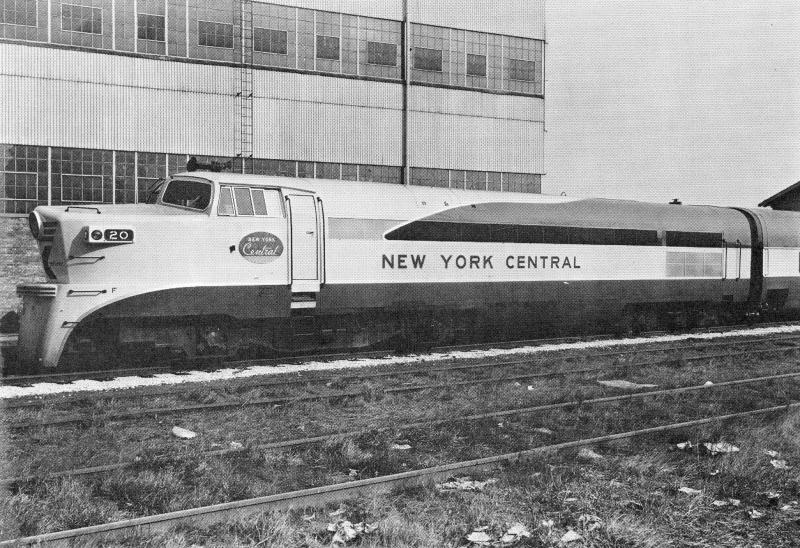
- Baldwin RP-210, NYC Beech Grove Shops, Indiana, May 1956
Type and origin
- Power type: Diesel-hydraulic
- Builder: Baldwin-Lima-Hamilton
- Serial number: 76108–76110
- Model: RP-210
- Build date: April & October 1956
- Total produced: 3
Specifications
- Configuration
  - AAR: B-2
- Gauge: 4 ft 8 1/2 in (1,435 mm)
- Length: 58 ft 9 in (17.91 m)
- Width: 10 ft 6 in (3.20 m)
- Height: 11 ft 0 in (3.35 m)
- Loco weight: 198,300 lb (89.9 t)
- Electric system/s: 660 V DC (NH only) traction motors, (2x)150 hp (110 kW)
- Current pickups: Third rail contact shoe, and pantograph (NH only)
- Prime mover: Maybach MD-655
- Engine type: Diesel
- Aspiration: Turbocharged
- Displacement: 3,930 cu in (64.4 L)
- Cylinders: 12
- Transmission: Mekydro Hydraulic
- Loco brake: Straight air
- Train brakes: Air
Performance figures
- Maximum speed: 120 mph (190 km/h)
- Power output: 1,000 hp (750 kW)
- Tractive effort: 21,000 lbf (93.4 kN)
Career
- Operators: New York Central Railroad, New Haven Railroad
- Class: NH: EDER-6
- Numbers: NYC: 20, NH: 3000–3001
- Locale: North America
- Disposition: Scrapped

The RP-210 was a streamlined 1,000 hp (750 kW) locomotive built in 1956 by Baldwin-Lima-Hamilton, specifically to operate with the experimental, all-aluminum Train-X coaches that were built by the Pullman-Standard Car Manufacturing Company. The model represented Baldwin's attempted entry into the lightweight passenger locomotive market, but only three of the low-slung diesel-hydraulic units were produced. The first RP-210 was built for the New York Central Railroad to power their Ohio Xplorer train between Cleveland, Columbus, and Cincinnati, and a pair was purchased by the New York, New Haven and Hartford Railroad to double-end their Dan'l Webster, running between New York City and Boston.

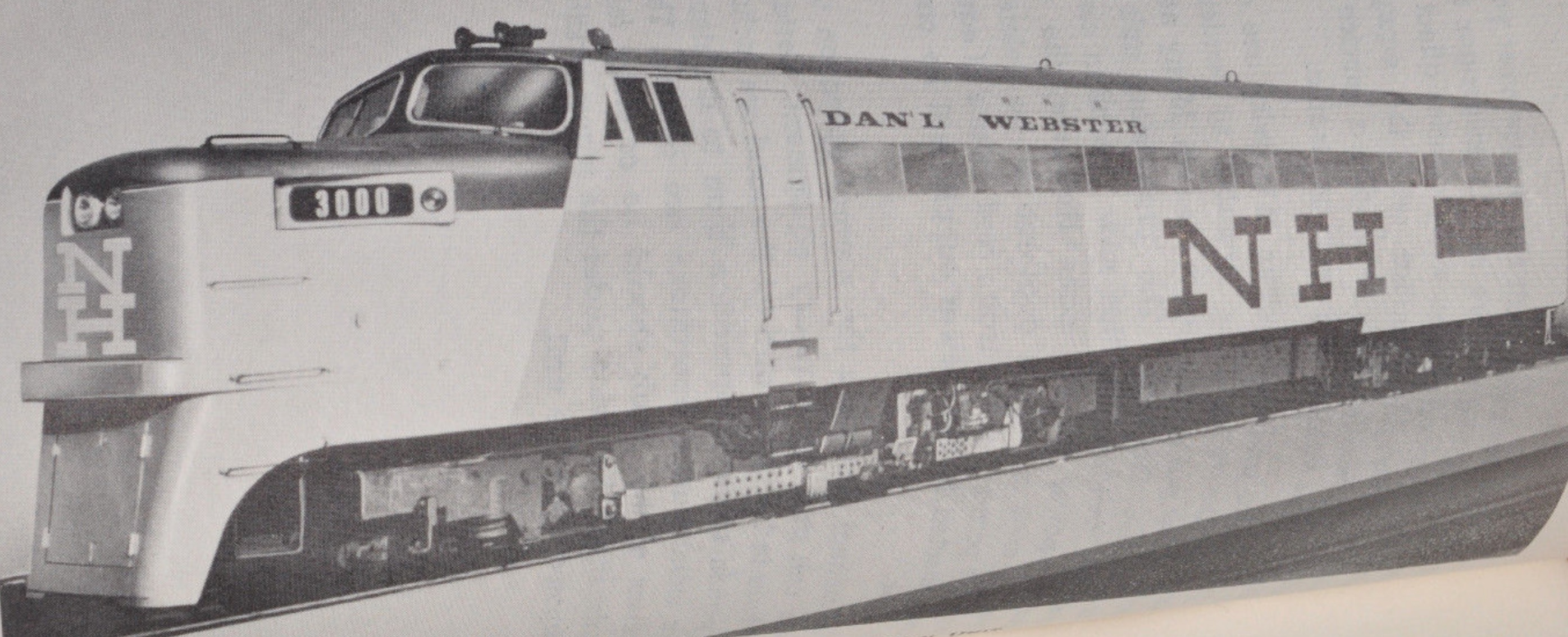
New Haven RP-210 with first 3rd-rail shoe revision on front truck, and roof DC pantograph not yet fitted, January 1957

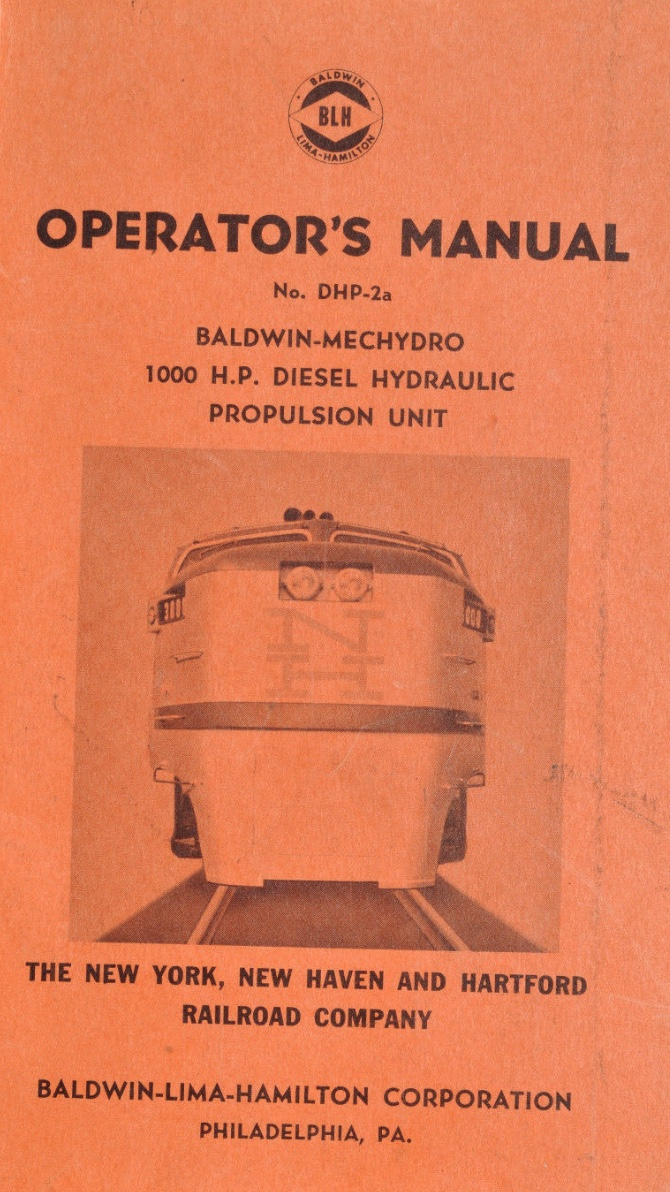
Operator's Manual (Cover) New Haven's Baldwin RP-210 locomotive, March 1957

The New Haven's RP-210s, with their three independent power systems, were among the most complex railroad locomotives in America. They featured a German prime mover with a hydraulic transmission, an auxiliary diesel and generator for on-train power, and two externally energized electric traction motors. The New York Central requested a booster unit, but none were built. The unique RP-210 was the last locomotive design to bear the BLH name. Along with the lightweight trains it powered, the RP-210 was unsuccessful in achieving stated goals and its service life was short. Baldwin-Lima-Hamilton expected to sell more to New Haven but NH went with 60 FL9 locomotives from EMD, which proved to be everything the RP-210 was not.

== Mechanical ==
The New Haven and New York Central variants of the locomotives, while related share a few major differences between them. One of the more obvious differences was the traditional Baldwin "Sharknose" front to be found on the New York Central variant. The three 99-short-ton (88-long-ton) units measured 58 ft 9 in (17.91 m) long by 10 ft 6 in (3.20 m) wide by 11 ft 0 in (3.35 m) high, and were configured in a B-2 wheel arrangement, with only the first two axles diesel-powered and geared for 120 mph (190 km/h).

The RP-210's twelve-cylinder 1,000 horsepower (750 kW) German Maybach MD-655 main diesel engine was mounted rigidly to (and pivoted with) the Mekydro hydraulic transmission (renamed Mechydro by Baldwin) on the locomotive's front truck. An auxiliary Maybach engine — a turbocharged 8-cylinder MD-440 hp (330 kW) on the NYC unit, and a turbocharged 6-cylinder MD-330 hp (245 kW) on the New Haven units — powered the locomotives' accessories, with a 480-volt generator to provide head-end power for train lighting, air-conditioning, and other ancillary loads.

Two small 150 hp (110 kW) electric-traction motors were also fitted to each New Haven locomotive. These were to draw their 660-Volt DC power from the New York Central's Third Rail (3rd-rail) system when moving the train through the final few miles of the Park Avenue Tunnel (railroad) into New York City's Grand Central Terminal. As the track speed there is limited to 35 mph (56 km/h) or less, the small traction motors at the front and rear of the lightweight train (a combined 600 hp (450 kW)) were considered adequate.

== Operational history ==
The Pullman-Standard Car Manufacturing Company delivered the Dan'l Webster to the New Haven Railroad in early October 1956. The New Haven then began test runs on its Shoreline Route between Boston and New York. The last 12.8 miles of the westbound trip saw trains passing through the third-rail electrified Harlem Division of the New York Central Railroad. The final 3 miles of this route was through the railroad's Park Avenue tunnel into Grand Central Terminal. Here the RP-210 locomotive was required to shut down its diesel engine and utilize electric traction motors.

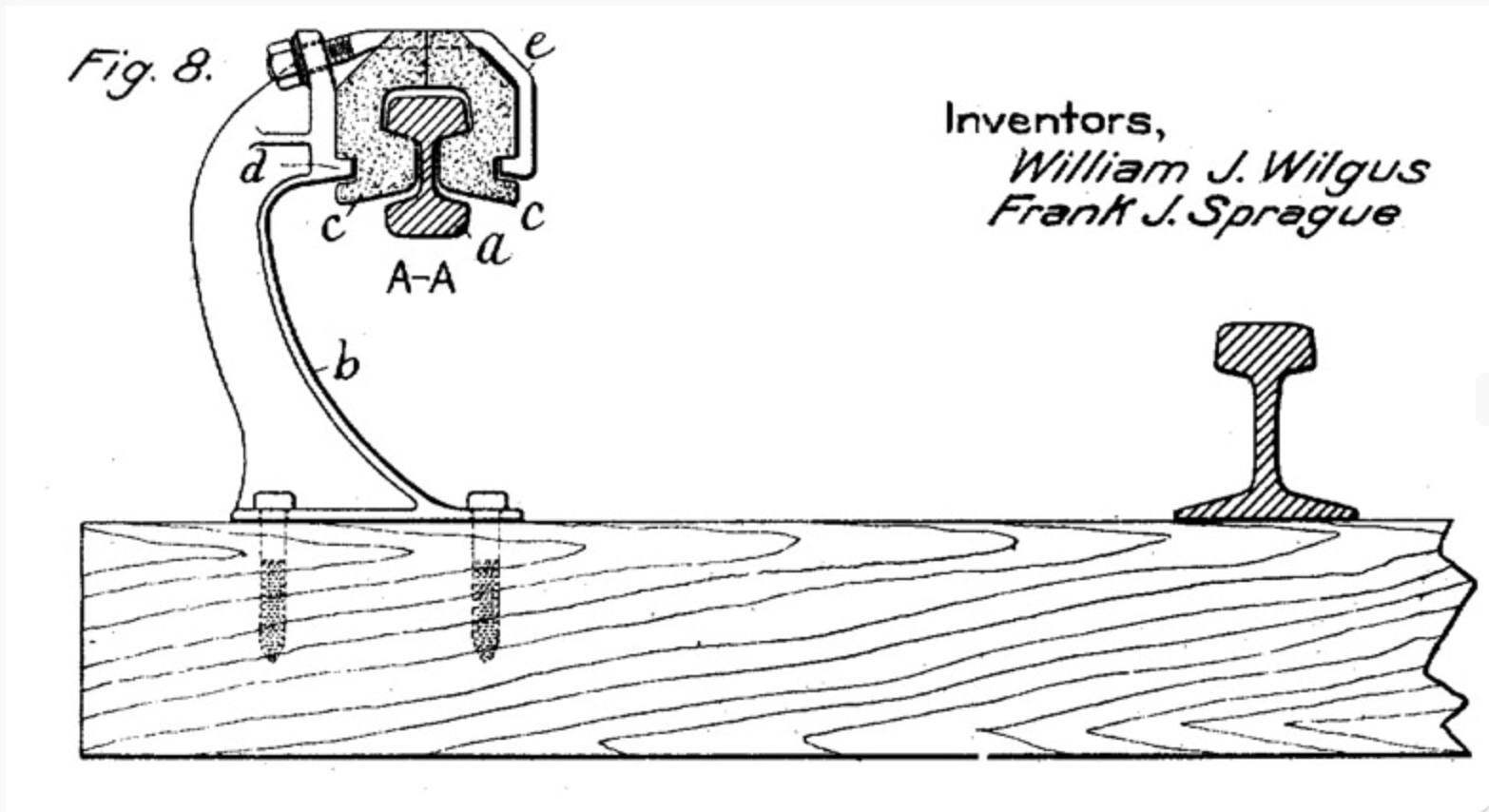
New York Central Railroad, Electric 3rd-rail, US Patent Illustration #8 (side-view), 1905

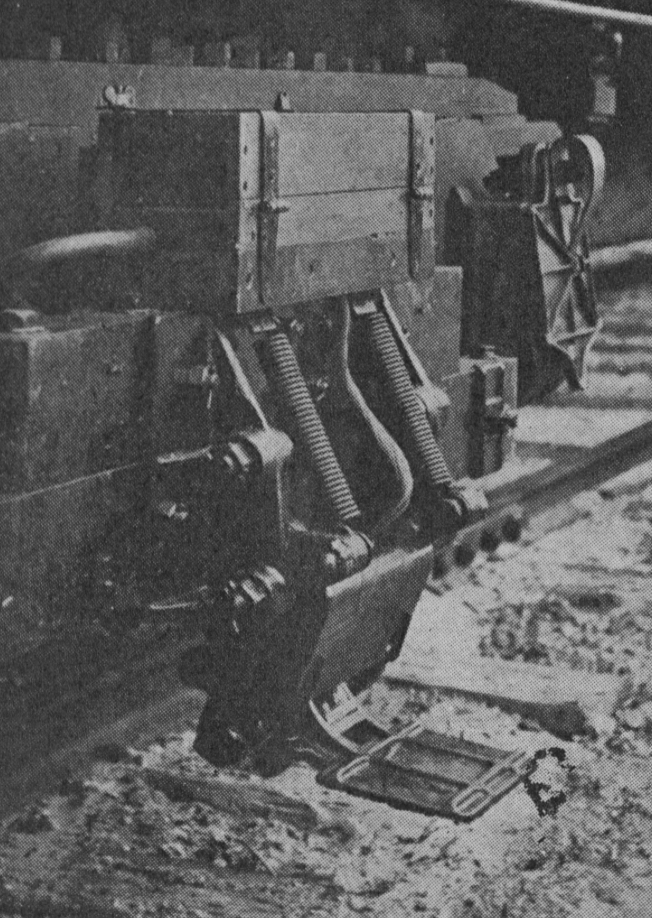
Mechanical 3rd-rail shoe (under-rail contact) in open position, c.1906

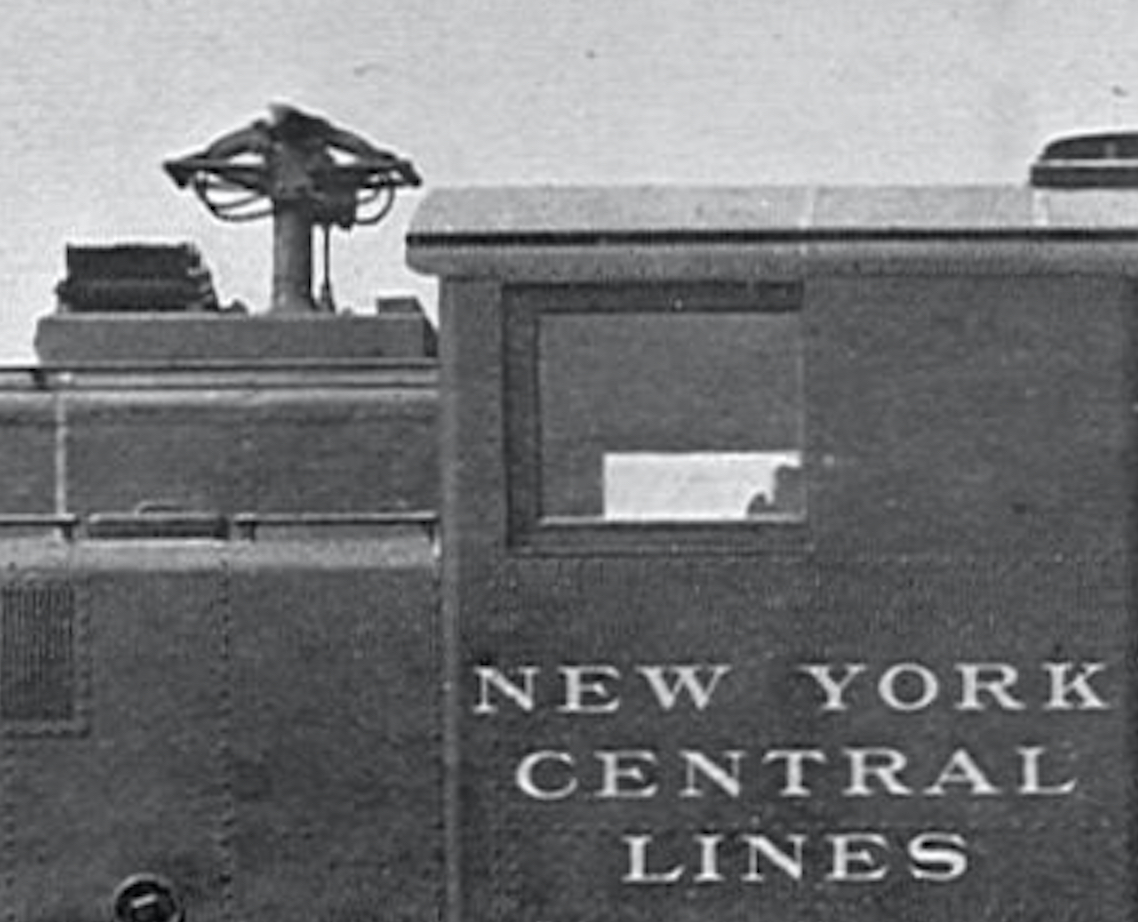
Grand Central Terminal tunnel contact pantograph, 1907

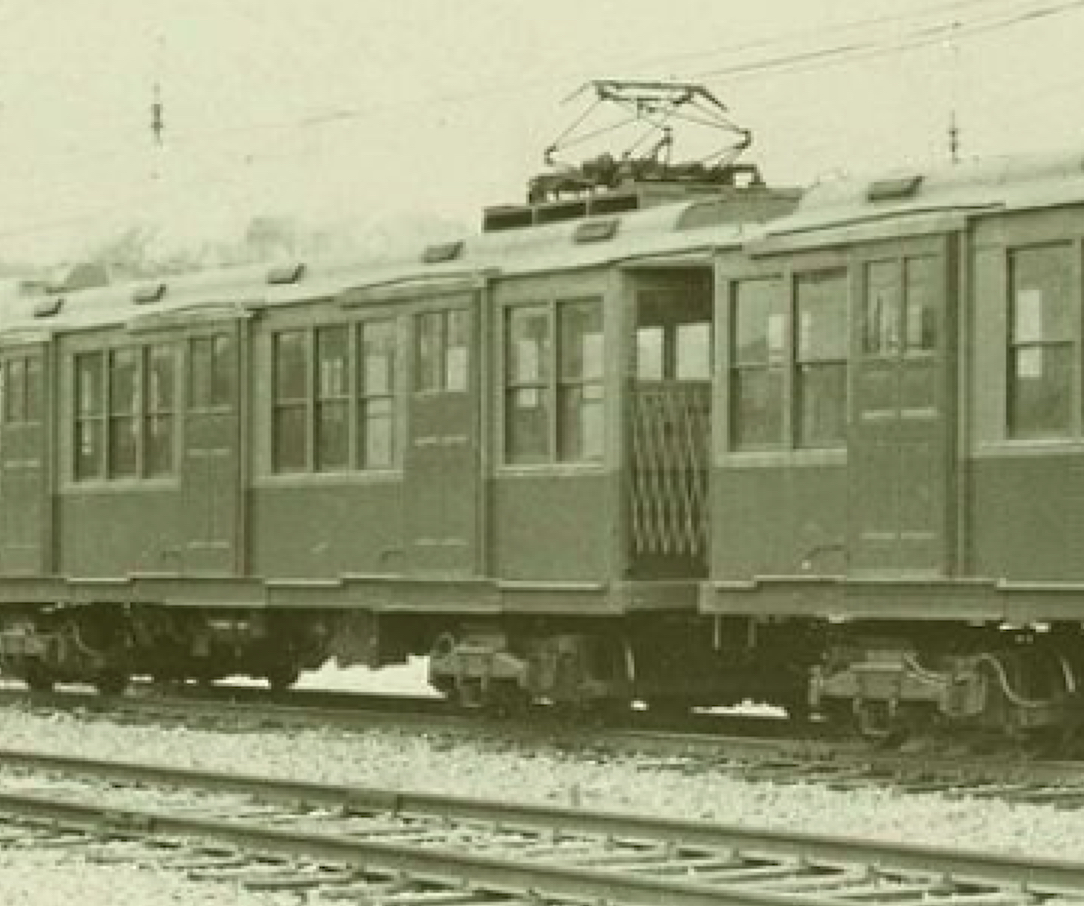
Low profile pantograph on Boston's MBTA "Blue Line" Subway Car, 1932

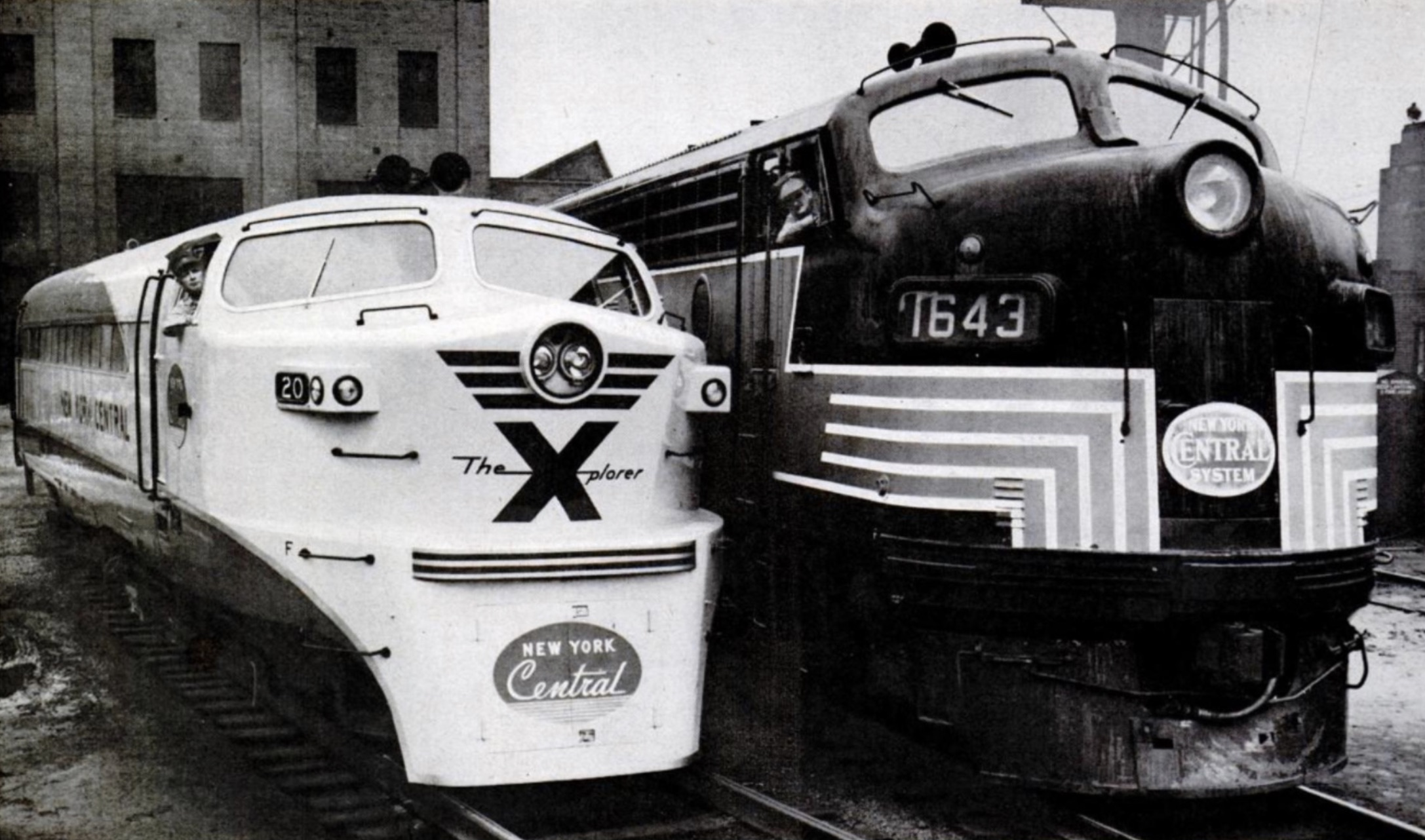
Low slung Baldwin RP-210 aside General Motors EMD F7 unit, August, 1956

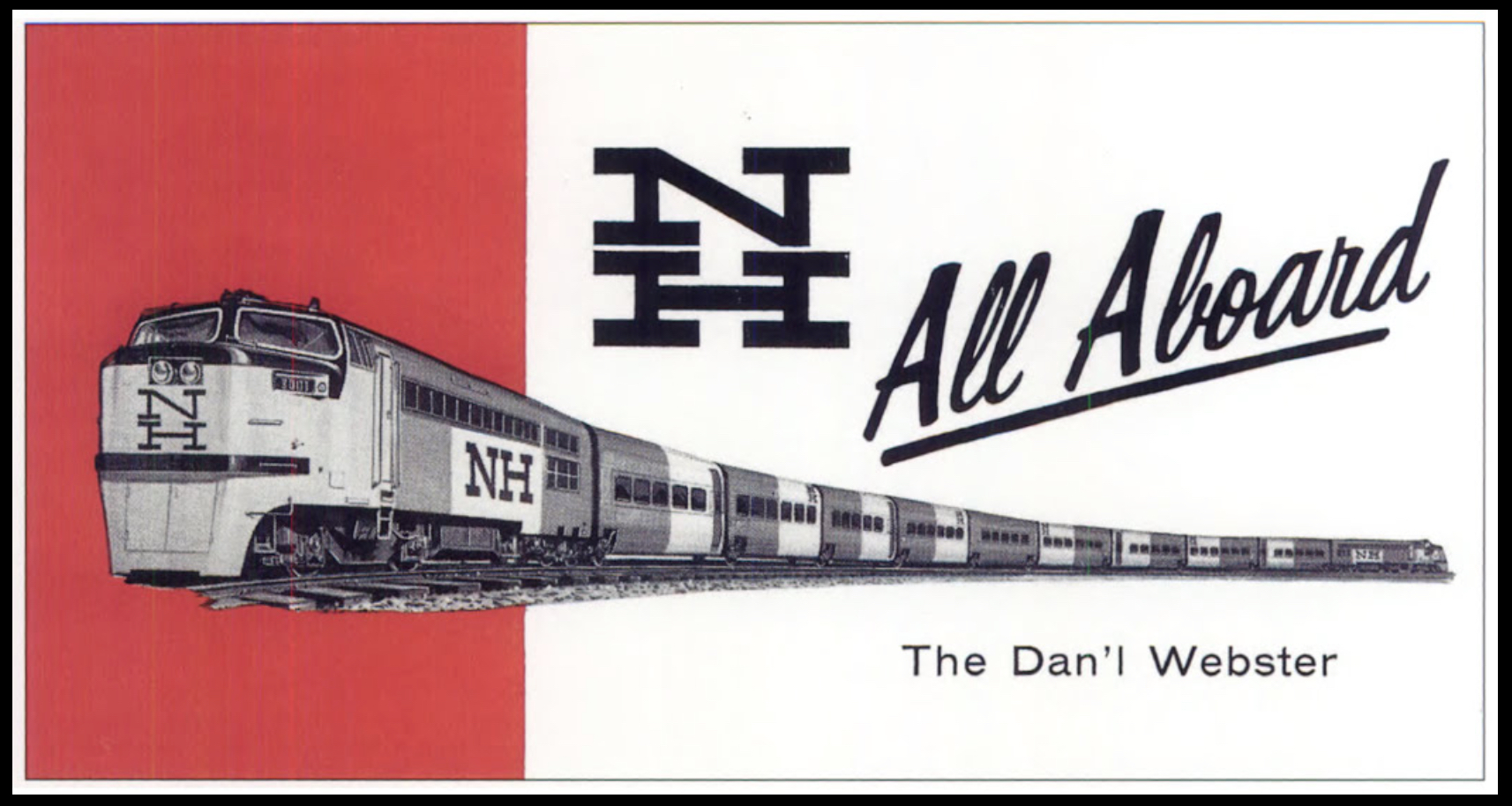
New Haven "Dan'l Webster", 1957 promo advertisement

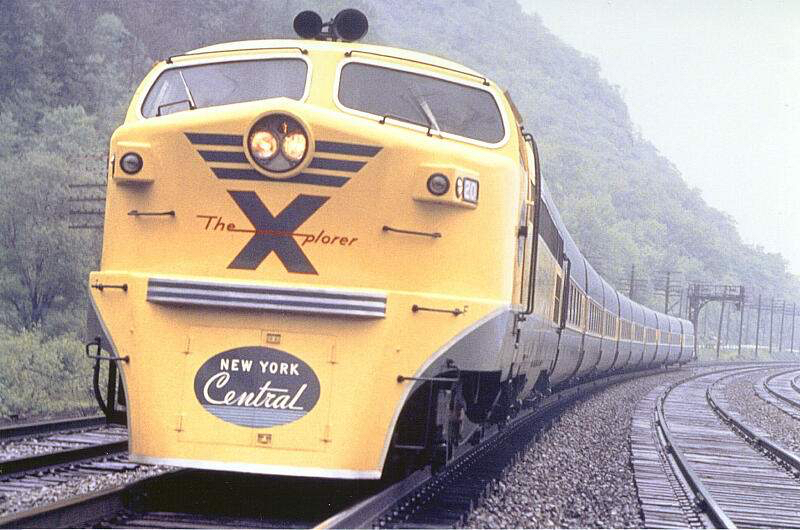
New York Central Railroad's "Xplorer" in June 1956

To meet the need for dual-powered operation, the New Haven's Bronx-based Van Nest electrical shops initially fitted the Baldwin units with one third-rail contact-shoe per side, bolted to a reinforced journal box bracket on the lead axle of the locomotive's rear truck. This placement was necessitated by the unusually wide gap between the axles on the locomotive's front truck in the diesel-hydraulic design.

However, experience had shown that a locomotive required two power collection shoes per side, as widely spaced as possible. This allowed for one of them to fail, and also limited the possibility that (if the train was suddenly forced to stop) the locomotive's contact-shoe might be short of the next section of energized 3rd-rail. The reduced power of the RP-210's small traction motors (300-hp), having only the front or rear locomotive unit of the Dan'l Webster positioned to draw 3rd-rail power would have made it difficult to accelerate the train (approximately 390 tons with passengers) from a standing stop potentially making it necessary to start the RP-210 diesel engine to move it to the next section of available trackside power and potentially alienating passengers with the exhaust fumes.

The Van Nest engineers and mechanics therefore scrambled to design a full-length support bracket for the RP-210's lead truck and attached a rather unconventional contact-shoe assembly to it. They completed their work just before the pre-inaugural press run of the train, scheduled for January 7, 1956, with regular service to commence the following day. The electrical shop supervisors advised against putting the new 3rd-rail shoes into service without proper testing but were overruled by a superior.

On January 7, the Dan'l Webster left Boston with New Haven president, George Alpert, and about 225 newsmen, promoters, politicians, and railroad managers aboard for the press-run. Things went well enough until the train merged from New Haven's track #1 to New York Central's track #2, opposite JO tower at Woodlawn Junction in the North Bronx. There was a contact-shoe on the aft RP-210 unit misaligned with the underside of the 3rd-rail, as it passed through the switch-point. The damaged contact scraped along the energized rail, creating a ground arc of electricity that set the locomotive's truck ablaze and began to melt away the aluminum side-skirting above it.

The train then made an emergency stop on the southbound express track at Woodlawn station. New York Police and Fire Department units were called to the scene and mainline service was disrupted for two hours. Minus the rear RP-210 locomotive and the last coach (which could not be detached, due to fire damage), the rest of the Dan'l Webster eventually proceeded on to Grand Central in New York City.

While being towed back to Van Nest shops by a switcher engine, the lightweight coach attached to the damaged locomotive derailed near Pelham station in Westchester County, resulting in an additional four-hour delay for evening commuters. On January 21, Time magazine crowned the public relations fiasco with a national news story titled, "The Devil & Dan'l Webster".

The lightweight train's inaugural service run was postponed until March 25, and the RP-210 units underwent further modifications to their 3rd-rail power contacts. A larger and more traditional mechanism, which the New Haven had regularly fastened to the journal boxes of their electric locomotives, was modified to fit the front and rear trucks. Winter testing saw some complications due to snow and icing, but this wasn't unexpected with 3rd-rail operations and could be viewed as abating with a change of season.

One more electric traction challenge remained. Between 47th and 59th Streets, the complexity of Grand Central's roadbed switching did not allow for an unbroken length of trackside 3rd-rail. So when the electrification was designed in 1905, an energized overhead rail was put in place to fill these power gaps. All New Haven and New York Central electric locomotives operating into the terminal were equipped with a small spring-tension roof-pantograph, mounted on a telescoping pole which extended to the overhead power supply.

Standing only 11 feet tall (about 2 feet shorter than average), the low-slung Baldwin locomotives again presented a problem not previously encountered. The traditional roof-mounted pantograph could not telescope far enough to reach the overhead 660-volt DC power rail. New Haven's Van Nest engineers realized that a small diamond-style pantograph (transport) would be needed to attain the required height. They found their solution perched atop Boston's Blue Line (MBTA) Revere Extension subway cars.

The New York Central's Xplorer began a system-wide promotional tour on June 3, 1956, which included an exhibition at New York's Grand Central Terminal. The train entered revenue service on July 15, 1956, as the Ohio Explorer, between Cleveland and Cincinnati. It continued on the route until August 17, 1957, when it was demoted to commutation runs between Chicago, Illinois, and Elkhart, Indiana, as trains #741 and #210. In late 1958, it was finally withdrawn from operation. The New Haven's Dan'l Webster lasted less than 15 months in service, from March 25, 1957, until June 5, 1958.

Both trains struggled with poor riding qualities and numerous mechanical issues, including transmission overheating in the Maybach diesel-hydraulic powertrain. Road mechanics were unfamiliar with the foreign prime mover and reported having to forage for metric hardware components at local Volkswagen dealerships. The Maybach maintenance manuals supplied for the diesel engines were only available in German.

At the New York Central's Collinwood Shops in Cleveland, where the RP-210 and its train became frequent visitors, maintenance crews first dubbed the new equipment, Mighty Mouse, for its relatively diminutive stature, and the whiskers-and-mouth effect suggested by the logo on the locomotive's shark-nose front. The railroad's new lightweight response to passenger service woes appeared to fit the Terrytoons character's motto, "Here I come to save the day!" However, numerous mechanical frustrations soon led the company's workers to re-label the train's diesel-hydraulic locomotive, the "Xploder".

On the New Haven, engine troubles were compounded by continuing difficulties in positioning and maintaining the 3rd-rail contacts. This resulted in the Dan'l Webster being shifted to the railroad's non-electrified Springfield Route (New Haven-Hartford-Springfield) as the winter of 1958 approached.

Baldwin-Lima-Hamilton delivered the RP-210s to the New Haven Railroad a month before General Motor's Electro-Motive Diesel (EMD) division in Illinois completed the first production model of the EMD FL-9 Electric-Diesel-Electric-Road locomotive (EDER in New Haven terminology). Despite this, New Haven classified the GM EMD unit as EDER-5 on the railroad's motive power roster, while it designated the earlier RP-210 as EDER-6.

The FL-9 would prove to be everything that the RP-210 was not. Over the next four years, the New Haven took delivery of sixty units. The last of these locomotives would be retired from mainline operations in 2009, after a half-century of service.

== Disposition ==
The New York Central's Ohio Xplorer train and its RP-210 diesel sat inactive until June 1963, when they were sold to Jones Tours, a subsidiary of the Pickens Railway, a Class-3 short-line in South Carolina, for use in passenger excursion service. The coaches and power units of the Dan'l Webster were moved to Cedar Hill Yards in East New Haven, and parked aside the yard office building in the dead motor storage section, adjacent to the old 44-stall roundhouse. There they languished until August 24, 1964, when they were hauled away to join their New York Central cousin in this southern rail-tour enterprise.

The arrival of the Dan'l Webster, with its twin RP-210 diesels, represented both an opportunity for tour expansion and needed spare parts. Jones Tours purchased the trains for little more than their scrap value (the original cost of the New Haven set had been $1,332,000.) and partially refurbished them at Pickens Railways' newly established car rebuilding plant on the property.

The Jones Tours Xplorers were hauled in passenger excursions, mostly between Charlotte, North Carolina, and Atlanta, Georgia, but ranged as far as Alabama and Florida. Pickens had a direct connection to the Southern Railway (U.S.) mainline at Easley, and to Seaboard Air Line Railroad, via the adjacent Greenville and Northern Railway (Class-3 short-line).

The train was pulled by a locomotive of its Class-1 hosts (on Seaboard, usually an EMD GP9), with in-train electricity provided by the auxiliary diesel-powered generator on board the Baldwin unit. The diesel-hydraulic prime-movers of the RP-210s remained operational for short trips over the Pickens, and the Greenville and Northern.

In 1967, Jones Tours (named after Pickens Railways' owner, James T. Jones of North Carolina) ended its rail-excursion service and parked both trains on a siding of the Greenville and Northern at Travelers Rest, South Carolina. From there, they were moved to the scrap yard in 1970.

Alan R. Cripe, who played a major role in the engineering development of Train-X under the auspices of the Chesapeake and Ohio Railway in the early 1950s, applied for inventor's patents covering some of the technology used in its design (January 10, 1956). Cripe later involved the Jones Tours train sets in evaluation tests for the development of his UAC TurboTrain during the mid-1960s. Unlike the Train-X coaches, the gas-turbine-powered TurboTrain utilized Cripe's car-tilting mechanics, for which he also sought a patent (May 11, 1966). These patents were granted in 1960 and 1969, respectively.

== See also ==
- The Dan'l Webster, a lightweight aluminum Talgo-type train built by Baldwin-Lima-Hamilton (RP-210) and Pullman-Standard for the New Haven Railroad.
- The Xplorer, a lightweight aluminum talgo-type train built by Baldwin-Lima-Hamilton (RP-210) and Pullman-Standard for the New York Central Railroad.
- The John Quincy Adams, a lightweight aluminum Talgo-licensed train built by Fairbanks-Morse (FM P-12-42) and American Car and Foundry for the New Haven Railroad.
- The Speed Merchant, a lightweight aluminum Talgo-licensed train built by Fairbanks-Morse (FM P-12-42) and American Car and Foundry for the Boston and Maine Railroad.
- The Aerotrain (GM) #1000 and 1001 (EMD LWT12), lightweight bus-body coach aluminum trains built by GM EMD. Leased to four US railroads, then sold to the Chicago, Rock Island and Pacific Railroad (the Rock Island Line).
- The Jet Rocket, a hybrid lightweight aluminum Talgo-licensed train built by GM EMD (EMD LWT12) and American Car and Foundry (talgo coaches) for the Rock Island Line.
- The Roger Williams, a low center of gravity DMU train built by the Budd Company for the New Haven Railroad.
- The UAC TurboTrain, an articulated, high-speed, gas-turbine powered aluminum train built by United Aircraft and Pullman. Initially, for the US-Department of Transportation.
- The British Rail Class 35 Hymek locomotive, powered by the same combination of Maybach engine and Mekydro transmission as the Baldwin RP-210.
