= Vegas (disambiguation) =

Vegas (Spanish for 'fertile valleys') is short for Las Vegas, a major city and tourist destination in the United States.

Vegas may also refer to:

== Places ==
- Las Vegas, New Mexico
- Vegas Creek, Nevada, an historical place located southeast of Las Vegas
- Vegas, Cayey, Puerto Rico, a barrio
- Vegas, Yauco, Puerto Rico, a barrio

== People ==
- Dimitri Vegas (Dimitri Thivaios, born 1982), Belgian DJ
- Jhonattan Vegas, Venezuelan golfer
- Johnny Vegas, English actor and comedian
- Koke Vegas (Jorge Ruiz Ojeda, born 1995), Spanish football goalkeeper
- Lolly Vegas, musician
- Mr. Vegas, Jamaican dancehall singer
- Pat Vegas, musician
- Sebastián Vegas (born 1996), Chilean footballer
- Tony Vegas, member of the turntablist DJ crew Scratch Perverts

== Algorithms and technology ==
- Magix Vegas Pro, video and audio editing software
- Orange Vegas, a touchscreen mobile phone released by Orange in 2009
- TCP Vegas, a congestion avoidance algorithm
- VEGAS algorithm

== Arts, entertainment, and media ==
=== Games ===
- Fallout: New Vegas, a 2010 video game
- Tom Clancy's Rainbow Six: Vegas, a 2006 video game
  - Tom Clancy's Rainbow Six: Vegas 2, a 2007 video game

=== Music ===
==== Groups ====
- Vegas (band), a Greek band
- Vegas (duo), a musical collaboration of Terry Hall and David A. Stewart

==== Albums ====
- Vegas (The Crystal Method album)
- Vegas (Vegas album), Hall and Stewart's 1992 album

==== Songs ====
- "Vegas" (Doja Cat song), a 2022 song by Doja Cat from the 2022 film Elvis
- "Vegas" (Sleeper song), a 1995 song by Sleeper
- "Vegas", a 2007 song by All Time Low from So Wrong, It's Right
- "Vegas", a 2014 song by Bad Meets Evil from Shady XV
- "Vegas", a 2007 song by Calvin Harris from I Created Disco
- "Vegas", a 2000 song by New Found Glory from New Found Glory
- "Vegas", a 2007 song by Sara Bareilles from Little Voice
- "Goin' to Vegas", a 1998 song by Jimmy Ray from Jimmy Ray

=== Television ===
- Vegas (1978 TV series), an American crime drama television series on ABC
- Vegas (2012 TV series), an American period drama television series on CBS
- Vegas (New Zealand TV series), a New Zealand drama television series on TVNZ
- "Vegas" (Malcolm in the Middle), a 2003 episode
- "Vegas" (Roseanne), a 1991 episode
- "Vegas" (Stargate Atlantis), a 2009 episode

=== Other arts, entertainment, and media ===
- Vegas (pinball machine)
- Vegas, part three of the limited series Herogasm as part of The Boys comic book franchise

== Other uses ==
- Vegas Oil and Gas, a petroleum exploration company in Egypt

== See also ==
- De la Vega (disambiguation)
- La Vega (disambiguation)
- Las Vegas (disambiguation)
- Vega (disambiguation)
- Vagus nerve
