= Roger Williams (train) =

American passenger train

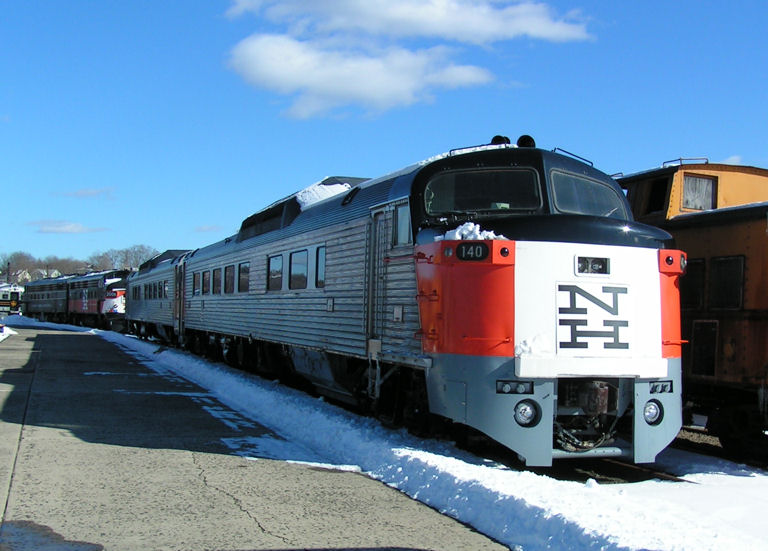
- New Haven #140 Roger Williams at the Danbury Railway Museum
- Manufacturer: Budd Company
- Constructed: 1956
- Number built: 1 trainset
- Formation: 2 cab cars and 4 intermediate cars

Specifications
- Car body construction: Stainless steel
- Prime movers: GM 110, (2 per car)
- Power output: 550 hp (410 kW) (per car)
- Transmission: Hydraulic torque converter
- Electric systems: 600 V DC third rail
- Current collection: Contact shoe
- UIC classification: (1A)(A1) (diesel power) (A1)(1A) (electric power)
- AAR wheel arrangement: 1A-A1 (diesel power); A1-1A (electric power)
- Braking system: Air
- Track gauge: 4 ft 8 1/2 in (1,435 mm) standard gauge

The Roger Williams was a six-car streamlined lightweight DMU passenger train built by the Budd Company in 1956 for the New York, New Haven and Hartford Railroad. The train was based on Budd's successful RDC DMU cars. The end two cars were equipped with streamlined locomotive style cabs and noses, resembling those on the Fairbanks-Morse P-12-42 Diesel locomotives. The four intermediate cars lacked operating controls and cabs.

For operation into Grand Central Terminal, the cars were each equipped with third-rail shoes, and small traction motors, allowing them to operate into the terminal under electric power, with their engines shut down.

Under Patrick McGinnis, the New Haven ordered three experimental high-speed trainsets in 1955: the Dan'l Webster, the John Quincy Adams, and the Roger Williams. All had interiors and exterior styling designed by architect Marcel Breuer as part of the new visual identity created by Knoll Associates.

After a short period of time in high-speed service, the train was split up, and the cars were used in service with the New Haven's other RDCs. They worked for the New Haven, Penn Central, and Amtrak, until the last cars were retired in the 1980s. In the 1970s, Amtrak used several ex-Roger Williams cars on the New Haven–Boston Bay State.

The two end cars, and one intermediate car, were preserved in operating condition, by a private owner, at the Hobo Railroad in Lincoln, New Hampshire. They were transferred to the Berkshire Scenic Railroad in 2023. Part of the trainset returned to operation at the Berkshire Scenic Railroad on April 27, 2024, powered by lead unit 140, after mechanical restoration was completed. The three Roger Williams cars at the Berkshire Scenic Railroad are privately owned by the Budd RDC Foundation, which agreed to lease them to Berkshire Scenic after being impressed by the museum's restoration of other RDCs.

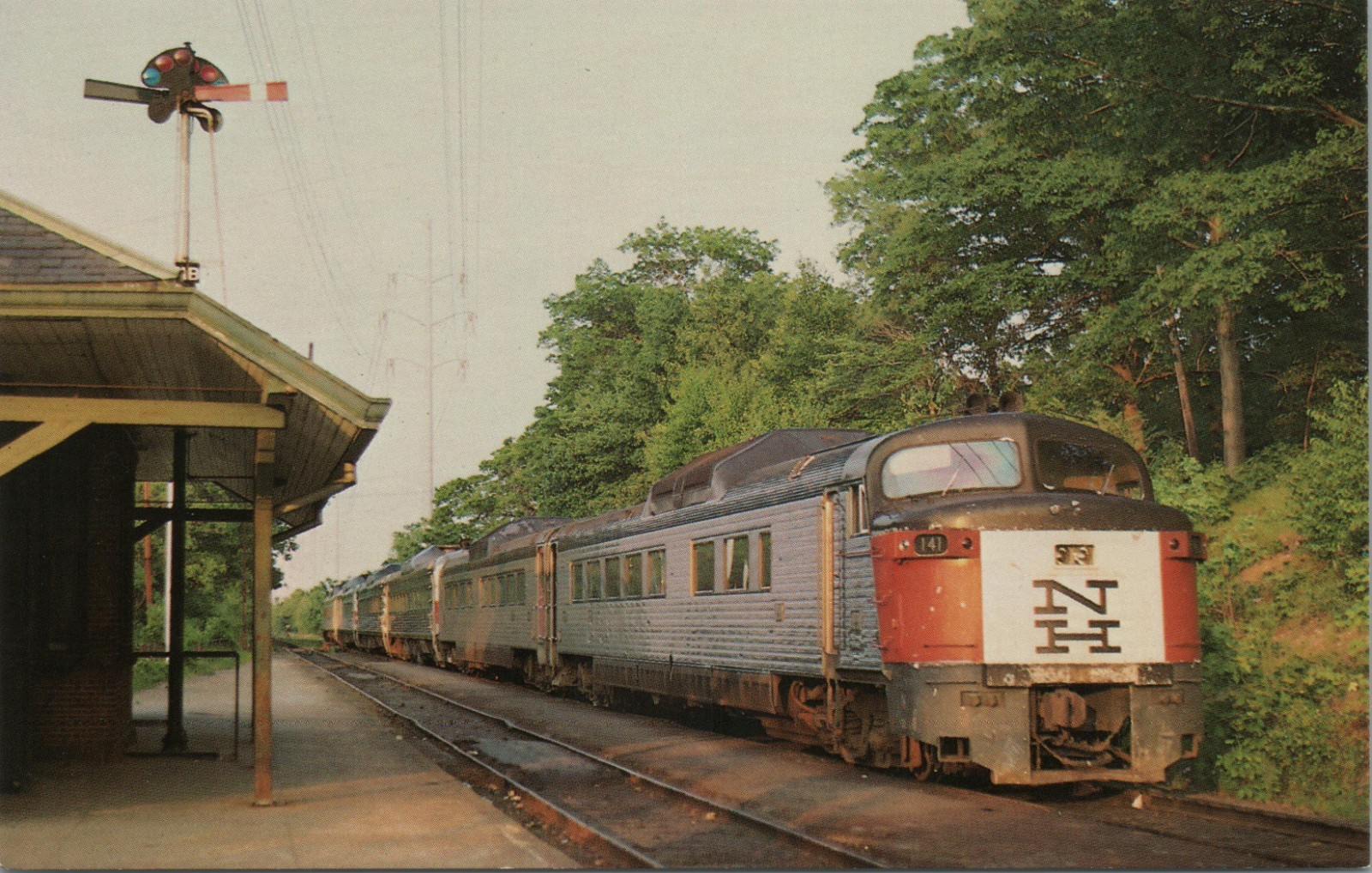
The Roger Williams trainset in service on the Penn Central Railroad in 1970

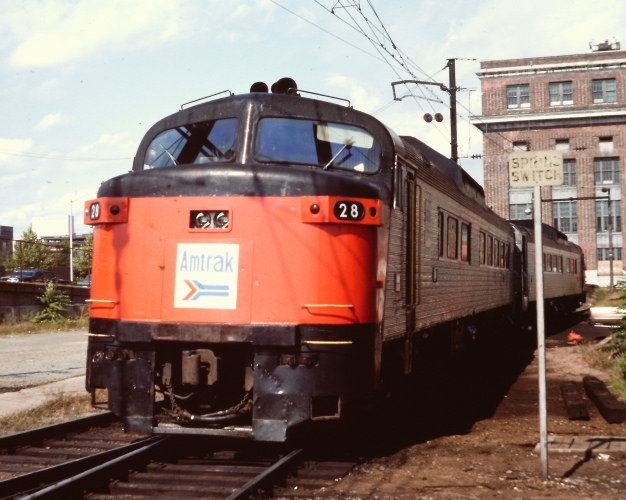
Part of the Roger Williams trainset in service on Amtrak in 1976

== See also ==
- Baldwin RP-210, a lightweight train locomotive built for the New Haven's Dan'l Webster train.
- Fairbanks-Morse P-12-42, a lightweight train locomotive built for the New Haven's John Quincy Adams train.
- EMD LWT12, a lightweight train locomotive built for GM's Aerotrain, and the Chicago, Rock Island and Pacific Railroad's Talgo Jet Rocket train.
