= X Train =

X Train can refer to:

== Transportation ==
- New South Wales Xplorer, a passenger train in Australia introduced in 1993
- Ohio Xplorer, a New York Central Railroad passenger train in Ohio introduced in 1956
- Train-X, a lightweight, all aluminum train produced by the Pullman-Standard Car Manufacturing Company
- The operational name of Las Vegas Railway Express, a company planning to operate passenger rail service between Southern California and Las Vegas

== Other uses ==
- Cross training, also known as "X-training", which has several uses in the context of physical and sport training (also: cross train → x-train)
- Take the X Train, a 1987 anime directed by Rintaro
- X-Trains, the mechas used by Lupin X/Patern X in Kaitou Sentai Lupinranger VS Keisatsu Sentai Patranger.
