= De la Vega =

De la Vega is a surname in the Spanish language, most of its bearers belonging to the nobility. It means "of the meadow" and may refer to:

== People ==
(arranged by date of birth)

- Garci Lasso de la Vega I, Cantabrian noble who was executed by Alfonso XI of Castile in 1326
- Garci Lasso de la Vega II, Cantabrian noble who was assassinated by Peter of Castile in 1351
- Garci Lasso Ruiz de la Vega, Cantabrian noble who was killed at the Battle of Nájera, 1340–1367
- Leonor Lasso de la Vega, (1367–1432) Cantabrian noblewoman,
- Garcilaso de la Vega (poet) (1501–1536), Spanish noble poet and soldier
- Inca Garcilaso de la Vega (1539–1616), Peruvian noble poet and writer
- Gabriel Lobo Lasso de la Vega (1558–1615), Spanish epic poet, playwright and historian
- Francisco Laso de la Vega (1568–1640), Spanish soldier and governor of Chile 1629–1639
- Luis Laso de la Vega (c. 1622–?), Mexican author, priest and lawyer
- Melchor Portocarrero, 3rd Count of Monclova (1636–1705), viceroy of New Spain 1686–1688
- Joseph de la Vega (c. 1650–1692), Spanish merchant, poet, and philanthropist, later moved to Amsterdam
- Diego de la Vega (Contador), (c. 1770–1812), Spanish nobleman and accountant
- Francisco Cajigal de la Vega (c. 1715–?), Spanish governor of Cuba
- Rómulo Díaz de la Vega (c. 1800–1877), an interim president of Mexico in 1855
- Daniel de la Vega (1892–1971), Chilean poet and playwright
- José Tadeo Mancheño y Laso de la Vega, (1784–1855) Chilean political figure
- Luis Ignacio de la Vega (c. 1914–?), Mexican Olympic basketball player
- Óscar Únzaga de la Vega (1916–1959), a Bolivian socialist politician
- Jorge de la Vega (1930–1971), an Argentine painter
- Aurelio de la Vega (1925–2022), a Cuban-American composer
- Juan de la Vega (b. 1934), a Peruvian footballer
- Sabas Pretelt de la Vega (b. 1946), Colombian economist and former Minister of the Interior and Justice
- María Teresa Fernández de la Vega (b. 1949), Spanish Socialist Workers' Party politician and former minister
- Ralph de la Vega (b. 1951), the Chief Operating Officer of Cingular Wireless
- Jazmín de la Vega (b. 1956), a Guatemalan architect and politician
- Jacqueline de la Vega (b. 1960), Mexican TV show host in Spain and former model
- Guadalupe Arizpe de la Vega, Mexican humanitarian
- James De La Vega, New York City graffiti artist
- Florencia de la V or Florencia de la Vega (b. 1976), Argentine transgender actress and vedette
- Diego de la Vega (footballer), (b. 1979), Argentinean footballer
- Cynthia de la Vega (b. 1991), Mexican model and beauty pageant titleholder

== Fiction ==
- Zorro, the secret identity of Don Diego de la Vega in the series by American writer Johnston McCulley
- Usnavi De La Vega, a character in the 2008 play In the Heights by writer Lin-Manuel Miranda
- Rogelio de la Vega, a character in the series Jane the Virgin

== Places ==
=== Dominican Republic ===
- Concepción de La Vega, a city in the central part of the Dominican Republic
- La Vega Province, Concepción de la Vega province of the Dominican Republic

=== Jamaica ===
- Spanish Town, or St. Jago de la Vega, the former capital of Jamaica

=== Peru ===
- Estadio Garcilaso de la Vega, the principal stadium in Cusco, Peru

=== Spain ===
- Alcalá de la Vega, a municipality in Cuenca, Castile-La Mancha, Spain
- Osa de la Vega, a municipality in Cuenca, Castile-La Mancha, Spain
- Fresno de la Vega, a small village in county León, Spain

== See also ==
- La Vega (disambiguation)
- Las Vegas (disambiguation)
- House of Lasso de la Vega
