= Las Vegas metropolitan area (disambiguation) =

The Las Vegas metropolitan area is the metropolitan area encompassing the Las Vegas Valley in Clark County, Nevada, United States.

The Las Vegas metropolitan area may also refer to:

- The Las Vegas–Paradise, NV MSA, the official Metropolitan Statistical Area for Las Vegas, Nevada
- The Las Vegas, New Mexico micropolitan area, United States

== See also ==
- Las Vegas (disambiguation)
