= Dan'l Webster =

Dan'l Webster may refer to:

- Daniel Webster, a United States Senator and Secretary of State;
- Dan'l Webster (train), a named train that used to run between New York City and Boston;
- Dan'l Webster, the name of a fictional frog featured in Mark Twain's short story "The Celebrated Jumping Frog of Calaveras County" and Lukas Foss's opera based on that story, The Jumping Frog of Calaveras County.
