= Pickens Railway =

Railway in South Carolina

Overview
- Headquarters: Cornelia, Georgia
- Reporting mark: PICK, PKHP
- Locale: Upstate South Carolina
- Dates of operation: 1898–
- Predecessor: Norfolk Southern (PKHP)

Technical
- Track gauge: 4 ft 8 1/2 in (1,435 mm) (standard gauge)
- Length: 37 miles (60 km)

Pickens Railway (reporting marks PICK, PKHP) is a shortline railroad that has operated on two separate divisions in the Upstate Region of South Carolina:

- Easley to Pickens: 9.9 miles (15.9 km) - abandoned and lifted in 2013.
- Anderson, through Belton to Honea Path: 28.5 miles (45.9 km)

Connections are made with the Norfolk Southern at Easley and Anderson, and with the Greenville and Western Railway at Belton. Rail was 85-100 pounds on the Easley-Pickens segment and 85 pounds on the Anderson-Honea Path segment.

Traffic included transportation equipment on the original Pickens line (in the form of locomotive remanufacture CLCX, Inc. located in Pickens until 2013), while the Anderson-Belton handles kaolin, limestone, synthetic rubber, rubber processing oil, plastics, silica, scrap metal, paper, scrap paper, bird feed ingredients, farm supplies, and electrical equipment.

== Pickens Railroad History ==
The Easley-Pickens line was chartered on December 24, 1890, by the South Carolina General Assembly after two failed attempts to build a railroad through Pickens from Easley. The line connected with the Atlanta and Charlotte Air Line Railroad (later the Southern Railway) and was completed in 1898.

On the railroad's first revenue run, the Pickens Railroad suffered a serious derailment that was caused by a local group of boys that had placed spikes on the rails, in their words, "to see what would happen." No one was seriously injured, but caused the fledgling company a serious financial setback, which operated in the red until 1905.

In its early years, it was nicknamed the "Pickens Doodle" because the train would run backwards to Easley and forward to Pickens, which "looked like a doodlebug," according to area residents. The Pickens Railroad, at the time did not have turning facilities until the line built two wye sections of track at each end of the line years later.

The Southern Railway briefly acquired control of the Pickens around 1910, however, it was reverted to local interests several years later.

In the 1920s, Singer Manufacturing located a sewing machine cabinet plant on the Pickens Railroad. The plant eventually became the railroad's biggest customer and the line was purchased outright in 1939 by Singer. In 1927, the Appalachian Lumber Company built a network of logging lines in the upper portion of Pickens County. By 1939, it too was also acquired by Singer and organized under the Poinsett Lumber and Manufacturing Company. Passenger service was discontinued in 1928 as better roads were built in the region.

In 1959, The Singer Company consolidated its sawmill and cabinet operations with the woodworking operations from Arkansas and the Craftsman power tools from New Jersey to the Pickens location. In 1963, Poinsett Lumber and Manufacturing Company announced that the Pickens Railroad was for sale. James F. Jones of North Carolina purchased the line for approximately $50,000. Jones built a new enginehouse and established a carshop for rebuilding and renovating railroad cars.

In 1963 and 1964, "Jones Tours" (named after Pickens Railways' owner, James Jones) purchased all three of Pullman Car Company’s Train X nine-car articulated lightweight trainsets, (the Xplorer from the New York Central, and the two Dan'l Webster trains from the New Haven Railroad) for use in passenger excursions. Jones purchased the trains for little more than their scrap value, and partially refurbished two of them at Pickens' newly established car rebuilding plant, the third train used for spare parts. These tours ran mostly between Charlotte, North Carolina, and Atlanta, Georgia, but ranged as far as Alabama and Florida. The Baldwin RP-210 diesel-hydraulic prime-movers of the trainsets remained operational for short trips over the Pickens and the Greenville & Northern, but the complete trainsets were pulled by locomotives of the Class-1 hosts on excursions further afield. In 1967 Jones Tours ended its rail-excursion service and parked the trains on a siding of the G&N at Travelers Rest, South Carolina, where they remained until removed for scrapping in 1970.

Jones sold the Pickens in 1973 to Philadelphia-based National Railway Utilization Company (NRUC), which expanded the carshop to build new freight cars.

In the early 1990s NRUC became Emergent Group and sold the railroad to CLC-Chattahoochee Locomotive Corp., which renamed the railroad Pickens Railway Company, according to the Federal Register, 1 May 1996. On April 2, 2013, Pickens Railway pulled the last train to Easley because of lack of business. The final run was pulled by Pickens #9502 and CLCX #12132. The last train ended an era of over 100 years of running to Easley.

== Pickens Expands ==
In 1991, Norfolk Southern Railway leased the Belton-Honea Path line to the Pickens under the "Thoroughbred Shortline Program." This line was built in the 1840s by the Greenville & Columbia, eventually becoming part of the Southern.

In 1994, the Pickens expanded further by leasing the Belton-Anderson line from Norfolk Southern. This line was built in the 1840s as part of the Blue Ridge Railway. Included was former Anderson trackage that had belonged to CSX previously owned by the Piedmont & Northern and Charleston & Western Carolina.

== Pickens locomotive history ==
The first Pickens locomotive was a secondhand 4-4-0 that was damaged in a derailment on its first trip. It was replaced in 1909 with a new 2-6-0 from Baldwin Locomotive Works and was numbered 1.

The line dieselized in 1947 with a Baldwin VO-660 (built as Singer Manufacturing #2), It was numbered 2 and was later named T. Grady Welborn. The 2-6-2 steam engine was sidelined until 1955 when it was sold for scrap. Number 2 is still on the property on the original Pickens trackage but has been out of service for some time as a switcher for CLCX, Inc. as of 2009.

In 1963, after the line was acquired by James F. Jones, the Pickens acquired an EMC SW locomotive. It was built for the Union Terminal Railroad Of St. Joseph as their #5, it later served as Missouri Pacific Railroad #6005 before it became Pickens #3. It was sold to Duke Power in the mid-1970s, which used it to haul construction materials for the building of the Cherokee Nuclear Power Plant near Gaffney, South Carolina. When the plant was sidelined in the early 80s, the unit, as well as the unfinished power plant, was sold to a movie company before being acquired by the Thermal Belt Railway in 1989, becoming their #1.

In the early 1970s a Baldwin S-8 was purchased by Pickens. It was built as Youngstown Sheet and Tube #701 in 1951. It became Pickens #5 (which named it Allan M. Baum) and was used as a backup locomotive. Pickens sold off #5 to SMS Rail Service in 2001, becoming their #102.

When the Pickens expanded in the early 1990s, it acquired a pair of ALCO S1s numbered 6 and 7. These were repowered with Caterpillar prime movers. Number 6 remained on the property, stored inoperable, until 2010 when it was scrapped onsite.

In 2000, the Pickens acquired a fleet of former CSX GE U18Bs numbered 9500-9508. One (9501) is used for parts.
