= Jaime de Zudáñez =

Bolivian politician (1776–1832)

Jaime de Zudáñez (25 July 1776, in Chuquisaca – 1832, in Montevideo) was a Bolivian politician and hero of the independence of three countries in South America.

== Biography ==
Zudáñez was born in the city of La Plata, Chuquisaca, in present-day Bolivia. He graduated as a lawyer in 1792, and continued his studies at the Academia Carolina, where he obtained a graduate degree in 1795 and was appointed Public Defender of Indigents. He was central to the independence movement that started in Chuquisaca on May 25, 1809, when after being arrested on suspicions of conspiracy, he publicly cried for help while being conducted to jail. A mob responded by taking over the city and capturing the authorities.

The Colonial authorities, after the recapture of the city, sent him as a prisoner to Callao, in Peru. From there, three months later, and after being liberated, he travelled to Chile (1811), where he worked with the generals Bernardo O'Higgins and Juan Mackenna, and became a friend of José Miguel Carrera. He had to seek refuge in Buenos Aires (1814) after the Battle of Rancagua.

Zudáñez was a Vice President of the Tucumán Congress (1817–1819). He lived in Montevideo, Uruguay by 1820 where he was later a deputy to Congress (1828–1830). He died in 1832.

== See also ==
- Jaime Zudáñez Province

Political offices
Preceded by Manuel de Salas	Secretary of Foreign Affairs; 1813	Succeeded by José Tadeo Mancheño
