= La Vega =

La Vega may refer to:

== Places ==
- La Vega (city), or Concepción de La Vega, the third largest city and municipality of the Dominican Republic
  - La Vega Province, a province in central Dominican Republic named for the city of La Vega
- La Vega, Cauca, a town and municipality in Colombia
- La Vega, Cundinamarca, a town and municipality in Colombia
- A Veiga, a Galician town whose Castilian name is La Vega
- La Vega, capital of the municipality of Vega de Liébana

== Music ==
- La Vega (Albéniz), an 1899 piano work by Isaac Albéniz
- Fiel a la Vega, a Rock en Español band from Puerto Rico formed in 1994
- Viva La Vega, a Norwegian DVD of the band Kaizers Orchestra

== Other uses ==
- La Vega Central Market, also known simply as "La Vega", in Santiago, Chile
- La Vega Independent School District, a public school district in Waco, Texas, USA
- Pietro la Vega (1764–1810), Italian artist

== See also ==
- De la Vega (disambiguation)
- Las Vegas (disambiguation)
- Vegas (disambiguation)
