= Las Vegas (disambiguation) =

Las Vegas is a major city in the U.S. state of Nevada.

Las Vegas may also refer to:

== Geography ==
=== Las Vegas, Nevada ===
- Las Vegas Valley, Nevada, consisting of the city of Las Vegas, the Strip, and other surrounding areas
- Las Vegas–Paradise, NV MSA, the metropolitan area, consisting of all of Clark County, Nevada
- Las Vegas Strip, just outside and south of the city proper, the resort destination and location of many of the largest hotel and casino resorts in the world
- Downtown Las Vegas, the downtown region of the city
- Downtown (Nevada gaming area), in Downtown Las Vegas
- Las Vegas Township, an umbrella township that covers the unincorporated towns in the Las Vegas Valley
- Las Vegas Valley (landform), the desert valley which contains most of the metropolitan population
- Las Vegas Wash, an urban river that drains the geological Las Vegas Valley
- Las Vegas Bay, at the western edge of Lake Mead
- North Las Vegas, Nevada

=== Other places ===
- Las Vegas, New Mexico, a city in the US state of New Mexico
- Las Vegas, Santa Bárbara, Honduras
- Las Vegas, Uruguay, a small seaside resort on the Costa de Oro
- Las Vegas (Corvera), a parish in Asturias, Spain
- Las Vegas (comarca), Madrid, Spain

== Arts, entertainment, and media ==
=== Films ===
- Viva Las Vegas, 1964 film with Elvis and Ann-Margret
- Last Vegas, 2013 movie

=== Games ===
- Las Vegas (board game), a gambling-themed board game
- Fallout: New Vegas, a videogame in the Fallout series set in post-apocalyptic Las Vegas

=== Music ===
==== Songs ====
- "Las Vegas" (Tony Christie song), 1971
- "Las Vegas" (Martin Stenmarck song), winning song for the Swedish Melodifestivalen 2005
- "Viva Las Vegas" (song), by Elvis Presley, 1964
- "Las Vegas (In the Hills of Donegal)", by Goats Don't Shave, 1992
- "Vegas", by Bad Meets Evil from Shady XV, 2014
- "Vegas", by Nina Hagen from Nina Hagen, 1989
- "Las Vegas", by Vowel Movement from Vowel Movement, 1995
- "Las Vegas", by Deacon Blue from Ooh Las Vegas, 1989
- "Las Vegas", by B'z from Epic Day, 2015

==== Instrumentals ====
- "Las Vegas", instrumental composed by Laurie Johnson 1960

=== Television ===
- "Las Vegas" (Modern Family), an episode of the American television series Modern Family
- Las Vegas (TV series), American TV series (2003–08)
- Las Vegas Television Network, proposed television network
- Vega$, American crime drama television series

== Schools ==
- Las Vegas Academy, a magnet high school
- Las Vegas College, in Henderson, Nevada
- Las Vegas Grammar School (Las Vegas Boulevard, Las Vegas, Nevada), a Registered Historic Place
- Las Vegas Grammar School (Washington and D Streets, Las Vegas, Nevada), a Registered Historic Place

== Transportation ==
- Las Vegas Union Plaza station, in Las Vegas, Nevada
- Las Vegas station (New Mexico), in Las Vegas, New Mexico
- City of Las Vegas (train), passenger train
- Las Vegas Union Pacific Station, a former rail station in Las Vegas
- USS Las Vegas Victory (AK-229), a US Navy cargo ship used during World War II

== Other uses ==
- Las Vegas algorithm, a computing algorithm
- Las Vegas Club, a casino and hotel
- Las Vegas culture (archaeology), a prehistoric culture in Ecuador

== See also ==
- De la Vega (disambiguation)
- La Vega (disambiguation)
- Vegas (disambiguation)
