= ZTE X760 =

Discontinued touchscreen mobile phone

ZTE X760 / Orange Vegas
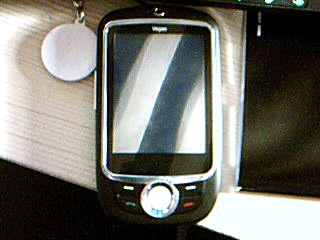
- Manufacturer: ZTE Corporation
- Availability by region: May 2009
- Compatible networks: Orange / T-Mobile UK PAYG
- Form factor: Bar
- Dimensions: 96 mm (3.8 in) H 45 mm (1.8 in) W 19 mm (0.75 in) D
- Weight: 84 g (3.0 oz)
- Operating system: Proprietary
- Memory: 517K
- Removable storage: microSD up to 4GB
- Battery: Lithium-Ion 670mAh (2.5Wh)
- Rear camera: 1.3 Megapixel
- Display: 2.4", 262K TFT Touchscreen
- Connectivity: USB, Bluetooth
- Data inputs: Touchscreen
- Model: X760

ZTE-G X760, also known as Orange Vegas, T-Mobile Vairy Touch, Vodafone Indie, and Vodafone V-X760, is a discontinued budget touchscreen mobile phone released in mid 2009 and made by ZTE. The cost of the Vegas was kept as low as possible by omitting many features from higher products while keeping a trendy touchscreen design. In the UK for example, the Orange Vegas was available for less than £40 on a Pay As You Go contract and they called it the “smallest, lightest, cheapest touchscreen mobile available in the UK”.

The phone was released in three colours: black, white, and pink. Its main feature is a 2.4-inch resistive touchscreen. It has a 1.3 MP Camera with MPEG-4 or H.263 video capture. There is support for video playback. The Vegas has an FM radio, an MP3 player and a web browser, although no 3G. It also comes with one pre-installed game (named Magicsushi) which is a variant on the classic game Bejewelled, replacing jewels with sushi. The phone's memory is comparatively small at only 517KB, but is expandable up to 4GB with the use of a microSD card.

== Reception ==
Trusted Reviews gave the Orange Vegas a score of 3 out of 5 and commented that it looked similar to a HTC Touch.
