= City of Las Vegas (train) =

Overview
- Service type: Inter-city rail
- Status: Discontinued
- Locale: Western United States
- First service: December 18, 1956
- Last service: June 15, 1968
- Former operator: Union Pacific Railroad

Route
- Termini: Los Angeles, California; Las Vegas, Nevada

Technical
- Track gauge: 4 ft 8 1/2 in (1,435 mm)

The City of Las Vegas was a streamlined passenger train operated by the Union Pacific Railroad between Las Vegas, Nevada and Los Angeles, California. It operated from 1956 to 1968. It was one of several trains to operate with the experimental General Motors Aerotrain, although this experiment was short-lived. After 1961 the train was known as the Las Vegas Holiday Special.

== History ==
The Union Pacific introduced the City of Las Vegas on December 18, 1956. The service initially used General Motors' experimental Aerotrain trainset, but the Union Pacific ended their lease within a year due to maintenance and performance problems including needing a helper engine to climb Cajon Pass. The train continued with standard streamlined cars in UP's Armour Yellow paint, leaving Los Angeles in the morning and returning in the evening.

On September 24, 1961, the name was changed to Las Vegas Holiday Special, when the consist and frequency were reduced. Service ended altogether on June 15, 1968.

== Equipment ==
Sample consist
September 15, 1957
- #5728 Mail car; #5360 coach (48 seats); #5339 coach (48 seats); #4000 lunch counter-dinette; #1502 "Pub" buffet-lounge; #5353 coach (48 seats); #5352 coach (48 seats); #5332 coach (48 seats)

The GM Aerotrain included nine cars: three 40-seat coaches, a bar-lounge, a "Chuck Wagon" buffet, three more 40-seat coaches, a 36-seat coach. The Union Pacific replaced the Aerotrain with conventional equipment on September 15, 1957. The new eight-car consist included a mail car, two 48-seat coaches, a lunch counter-dinette, a "Pub" buffet-lounge, and three more 48-seat coaches. These cars were drawn from a variety of sources. The coaches were built by Pullman-Standard in 1942 for the San Francisco Overland Limited. The lunch-counter dinette was part of a set of four (numbered 4000–4003) built by American Car and Foundry for the City of St. Louis in 1951. The dinette portion seated 16 while the counter area seated 21 along a 42-foot (13 m)-long countertop. The "Pub" was originally coach #5201, part of a set of twelve (5200-5211) built by Pullman-Standard for the Challenger in 1937.

== See also ==
- Passenger train service on the Union Pacific Railroad
