= Jacqueline de la Vega =

Mexican show host and model

Jacqueline de la Vega (born 29 December 1966 in Mexico City) is a Mexican show woman and former model based in Spain. She has one son, named Iker Fernández de la Vega.
