= Dan'l Webster (train) =

American passenger train

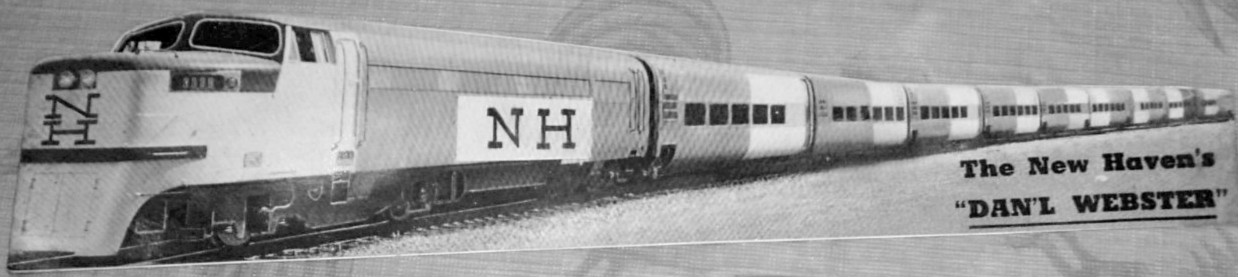
Promotional photo standee of the train

The Dan'l Webster was a trainset of the New York, New Haven and Hartford Railroad, between Grand Central Terminal, New York, New York, and South Station, Boston, Massachusetts. It only operated from 1957 to 1958.

The trainset was built by Pullman to their lightweight Train-X design. The train had nine short cars articulated together. The center car had two axles (one at each end), with the remaining cars having a single axle each, being supported by adjacent cars at the end opposite the axle. The ride was rough, as with most of the other lightweight trains of the period, and the train was not a success. The Dan'l Webster was powered by two Baldwin RP-210 diesel-hydraulic locomotives connected by multiple unit control through the train.

Under Patrick McGinnis, the New Haven ordered three experimental high-speed trainsets in 1955: the Dan'l Webster, the John Quincy Adams, and the Roger Williams. All had interiors and exterior styling designed by architect Marcel Breuer as part of the new visual identity created by Knoll Associates. A pre-inaugural trip of the Dan'l Webster on January 8, 1957 was marred by a fire started by a dragging third rail shoe. Regular service began on March 25, 1957, along with the John Quincy Adams, on the New Haven–Boston run.

Like its companions, the Dan'l Webster proved unreliable. Passengers also objected to the lack of a dining car on the new lightweight trains. The Dan'l Webster was shifted to New York–Springfield service – a less prestigious run – in February 1958. It appeared in schedules under existing train names rather than as the "Dan'l Webster". The John Quincy Adams and Dan'l Webster were removed from service in June 1958. The New Haven blamed the fixed consist lengths – which could not be adjusted to meet demand – and difficulty maintaining the unique trainsets.

The trainset sat in Cedar Hill Yard until August 1964, when it was sold to Jones Tours (owned by the Pickens Railway). It was largely used as a parts source for the Xplorer, which the railroad operated for excursion service. That service ended in 1967 and the trainsets were scrapped around 1970.
