= John Quincy Adams (train) =

Named train of the New York, New Haven & Hartford Railroad

The John Quincy Adams was a named train of the New York, New Haven & Hartford Railroad, between New York, New York and Boston, Massachusetts. The John Quincy Adams was an attempt by the New Haven to modernize rail travel and lure people out of their cars. The train was built by American Car and Foundry to a lightweight Talgo design, and was powered by two Fairbanks-Morse P-12-42 Diesel-electric locomotives, one at each end of the train, connected by multiple unit control. It was nearly identical to the Speed Merchant operated by the Boston and Maine Railroad.

The train consisted of five sections, each made up of three short cars articulated together. The center car of each section had two axles (one at each end), with the remaining cars having a single axle each, being supported by adjacent cars at the end opposite the axle. The ride was rough, as with most of the other lightweight trains of the period, and the train was not a success.

Under Patrick McGinnis, the New Haven ordered three experimental high-speed trainsets in 1955: the Dan'l Webster, the John Quincy Adams, and the Roger Williams. All had interiors and exterior styling designed by architect Marcel Breuer as part of the new visual identity created by Knoll Associates.

The train was sold in 1962 to the Ferrocarril de Langreo in Spain, where it was used until 1983. The locomotives remained unused after that sale of the train, and were scrapped in 1971.
