= José Tadeo Mancheño =

Chilean politician

José Tadeo Mancheño y Laso de la Vega (ca. 1784–1855) was a Chilean political figure.

Mancheño was born in Santiago, the son of José Antonio Mancheño and of Angelina Laso de la Vega. He was trained as a lawyer at the Universidad de San Felipe, where he graduated on October 29, 1810. He married Antonia Elizalde, and together they had eight children.

During the Chilean War of Independence, he alternatively supported both sides. In the Patria Vieja period, he was Secretary of Foreign Affairs between October 9, 1813 until March 9, 1814, nominated by the junta headed by José Miguel Infante. After the Spanish Reconquista, he served as juridical assessor and secretary of the Cabildo (City hall) of Santiago, a position he retained after the Battle of Chacabuco and the collapse of the Colonial government.

Mancheño was appointed a member of the Court of Appeals first and later as a member of the Supreme Court. He was the secretary of the constitutional convention that redacted the Constitution of 1822. Elected Alternate Deputy for "Santiago" (1823), and later for "Curicó" (1824–1825). Administrator of the Hospital of San Juan de Dios. Nominated member of the council of state. Elected Senador (1852–1861), he took his position on June 7, 1852; died before the end of his term at the age of 71.

Political offices
| Preceded by Jaime de Zudáñez | Secretary of Foreign Affairs; 1813–1814 | Succeeded by José María Villareal |
