= Aerotrain (GM) =

American streamlined train (1955–1966)

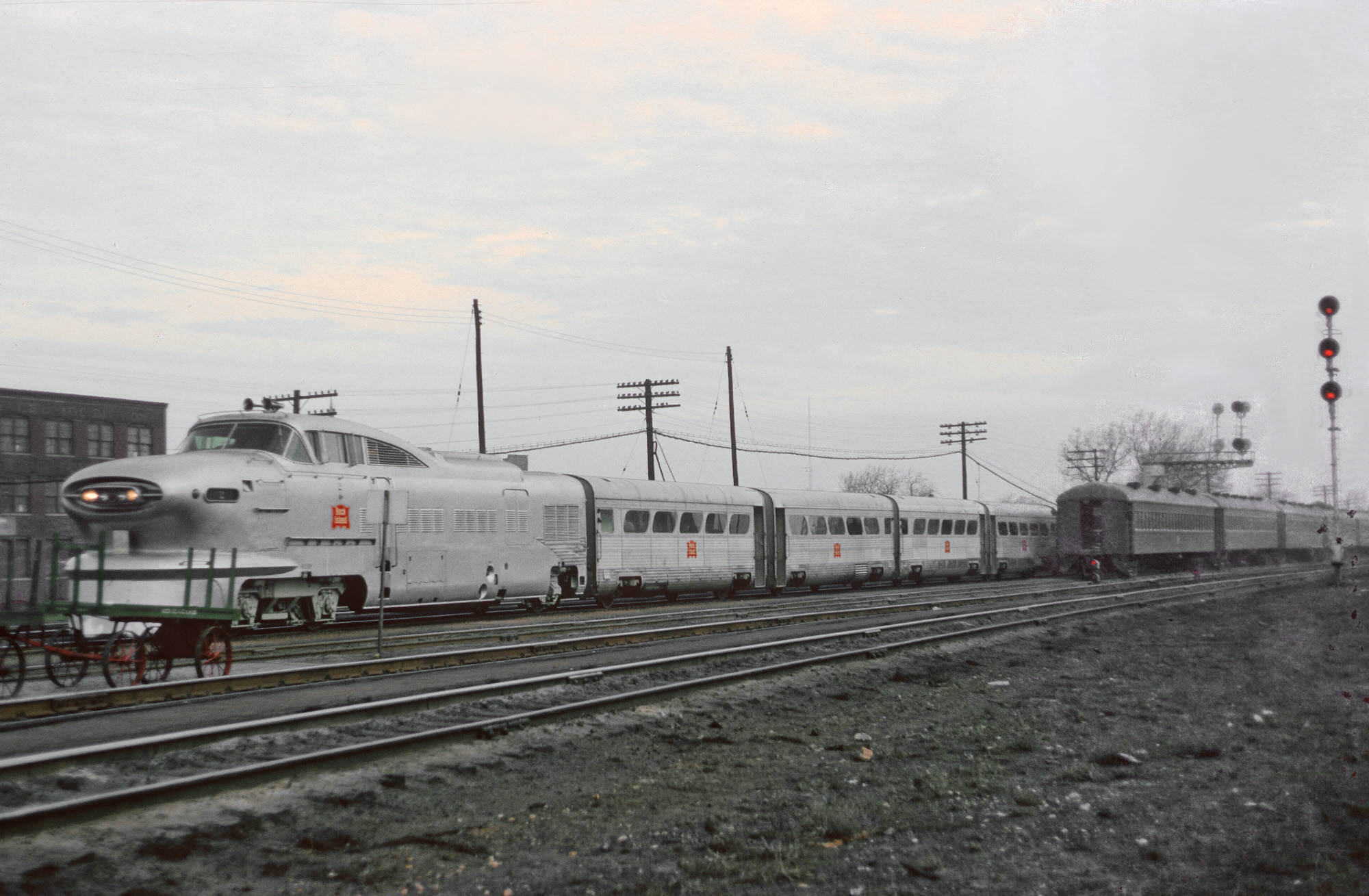
An Aerotrain operating in suburban service in April 1965 as Chicago, Rock Island and Pacific Railroad No. 2 at Chicago's Englewood Union Station.

The Aerotrain is a retired streamlined trainset that the General Motors (GM) Electro-Motive Division (EMD) introduced in 1955. GM originally designated the light-weight consist as Train-Y (Pullman-Standard's Train-X project was already underway) before the company adopted the Aerotrain marketing name.

== Design and components ==
GM's Styling Section first brought the Aerotrain's train to life, as it did for all of GM's body designs of that mid-century era. Chuck Jordan was in charge of designing the Aerotrain as chief designer of special projects. GM constructed two Aerotrains, each of which used one of the last two (serial numbers 21463 and 21464) of three experimental diesel–electric EMD LWT12 power cars that the company built.

GM based the EMD LWT12's power components on those in the EMD SW1200 switcher. Like the SW1200, the LWT12 used the company's model EMD 567C 12-cylinder prime mover that could produce 1,200 hp (890 kW). The power car featured a cab that mimicked an aircraft's cockpit. The locomotive's overall design was similar to that of General Motors automobiles at the time.

The company completed the Aerotrains by coupling each of the two locomotives to sets of ten modified GM Truck & Coach Division (GMC) 40-seat intercity highway bus bodies. Designed to resemble the new PD-4501 Scenicruiser buses that GMC was building for Greyhound, the Aerotrain's passenger cars had windows with slanted sides. The finned back end of the train resembled the rear of a 1955 Chevrolet or Pontiac station wagon. Each car rode on two axles with an air suspension system that was intended to give a smooth ride, but had the opposite effect.

GM returned to a concept first used at the start of the streamliner era: semi-permanently coupled trains. The cars were 40 ft (12 m) long, half the length of standard designs and thus half their weight. To further reduce weight, the locomotives and cars were made of aluminum rather than steel.

== History ==
On August 22, 1955, Mrs. N.C. Dezendorf, the wife of GM vice-president and EMD general manager N.C. Dezendorf, christened the first Aerotrain trainset (GM-T1) during a press preview of the train that EMD held at its plant in McCook, Illinois (mailing address: La Grange, Illinois) near Chicago. On January 5, 1956, one Aerotrain made a test run from Washington to Newark on the Pennsylvania Railroad while the other traveled in four hours from Chicago to Detroit on the New York Central Railroad.

In late February 1956, the Pennsylvania Railroad rented the first train from GM and began operating it between New York City and Pittsburgh as the Pennsy (No. 1000). In June, the Pennsylvania reduced its Aerotrain's route, whereupon the trainset traveled only between Philadelphia and Pittsburgh.

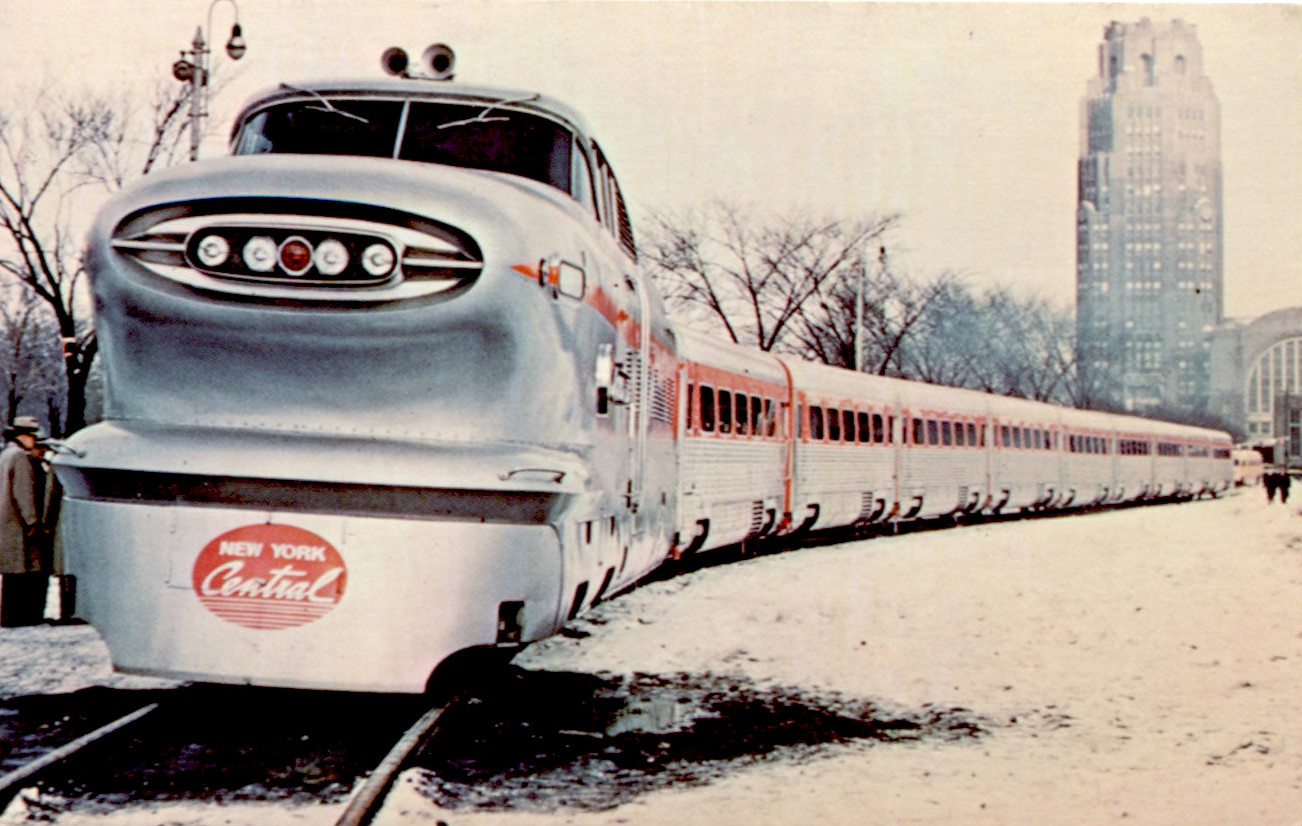
The New York Central Railroad's Aerotrain at the Buffalo Central Terminal in 1956.

After the second train’s initial test run on January 5, General Motors demonstrated it on several railroads, including the Atchison, Topeka and Santa Fe Railway, where in April the train operated in California between Los Angeles and San Diego as a San Diegan. In late April, the New York Central began to operate that train in revenue service as the Great Lakes Aerotrain between Chicago and Detroit during a trial period. From July to October, the New York Central ran the train between Chicago and Cleveland while continuing the trial period, after which it returned the train to GM.

In December 1956, the Union Pacific Railroad began to operate the second train between Los Angeles and Las Vegas as the City of Las Vegas (No. 1001). The Pennsy continued to run between Philadelphia and Pittsburgh until June 1957, after which time the first trainset joined the second in the Union Pacific's City of Las Vegas service. Dissatisfied with both, the Union Pacific stopped operating the trainsets in September and October 1957.

In October, 1958, General Motors sold both trainsets at a discount to the Chicago, Rock Island and Pacific Railroad (the Rock Island line), which designated their locomotives as numbers 2 and 3 while using both trainsets in commuter service between Chicago and Joliet. The two trainsets ended service in 1966, ten years after they first ran. Although the Rock Island scrapped or re-used most of the trainsets' equipment, both locomotives and two pairs of coaches remain on display in museums.

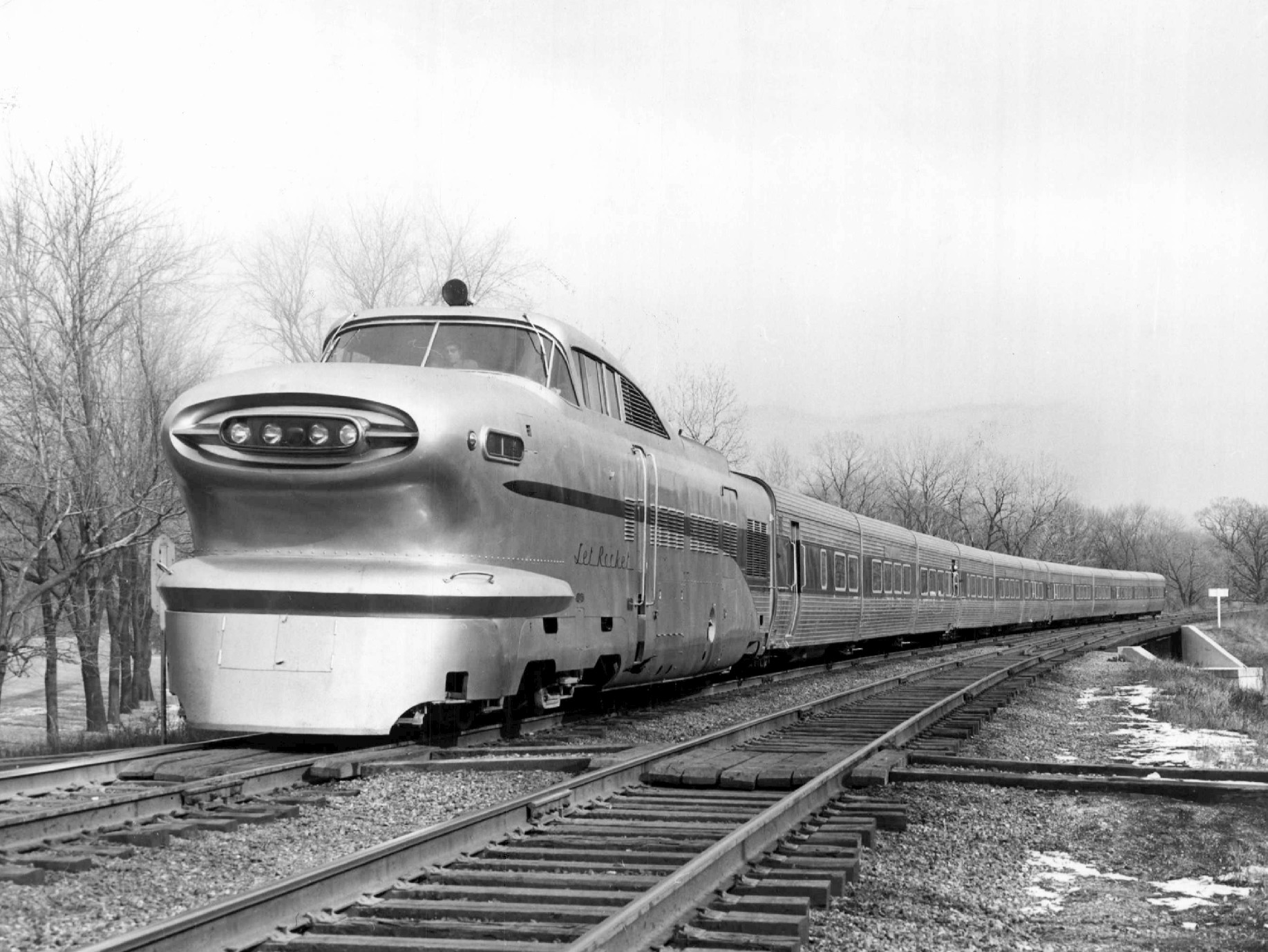
An EMD LWT12 locomotive pulling the Rock Island line's Jet Rocket.

Meanwhile, the first EMD LWT12 locomotive (serial number 20826), began to travel on the Rock Island line between Chicago and Peoria in February 1956 when pulling the line's Jet Rocket train, which bore a strong resemblance to an Aerotrain. The Rock Island later designated the power car as locomotive number 1.

The American Car and Foundry Company constructed the Jet Rocket's coaches, most of which were similar, but not identical, to those of the Talgo II. The last car resembled that of the future Talgo III.

Unlike the slanted sides of the windows on the Aerotrain's ten coaches, the windows on the Jet Rocket's twelve coaches had vertical sides. In addition, the Jet Rocket's Talgo-like coaches had one axle, whereas the Aerotrain's coaches had two.

After less than two years, the Rock Island shortened the Jet Rocket's route. The train then traveled only between Chicago and Joliet, as did the railroad's two Aerotrains. The railroad scrapped the train several years later.

GM's "lightweight with a heavyweight future" was introduced at a time when passenger train revenues were declining due to competition from airlines and private automobiles. Although they featured a streamlined design, the Aerotrains failed to capture the public's imagination. Their cars, based on GM's bus designs and using an air cushioning system, were rough riding and uncomfortable. The design of the locomotive section made routine maintenance difficult and it was underpowered.

Originally intended to reach speeds of up to 100 mph (161 km/h) and to travel between New York City and Chicago in 10.5 hours, modifications reduced the Aerotrain's maximum speed to 80 mph (129 km/h). The Atchison, Topeka and Santa Fe needed a helper locomotive to enable the 1,200 horsepower LWT-12 power car to climb the Sorrento grade outside of San Diego when pulling the Aerotrain's ten coaches as a San Diegan. A Union Pacific LWT-12 later required the assistance of a 1,750 horsepower EMD GP9 switcher locomotive to transport the cars of the City of Las Vegas up Southern California's Cajon Pass. Uncomfortable riding conditions associated with the Aerotrain's higher speeds later prompted the Rock Island line to restrict its two cheaply-purchased Aerotrains to low-speed commuter service in and near Chicago, retiring the trainsets in 1966, after a decade of active service with the various operators.

== Preserved Aerotrains ==
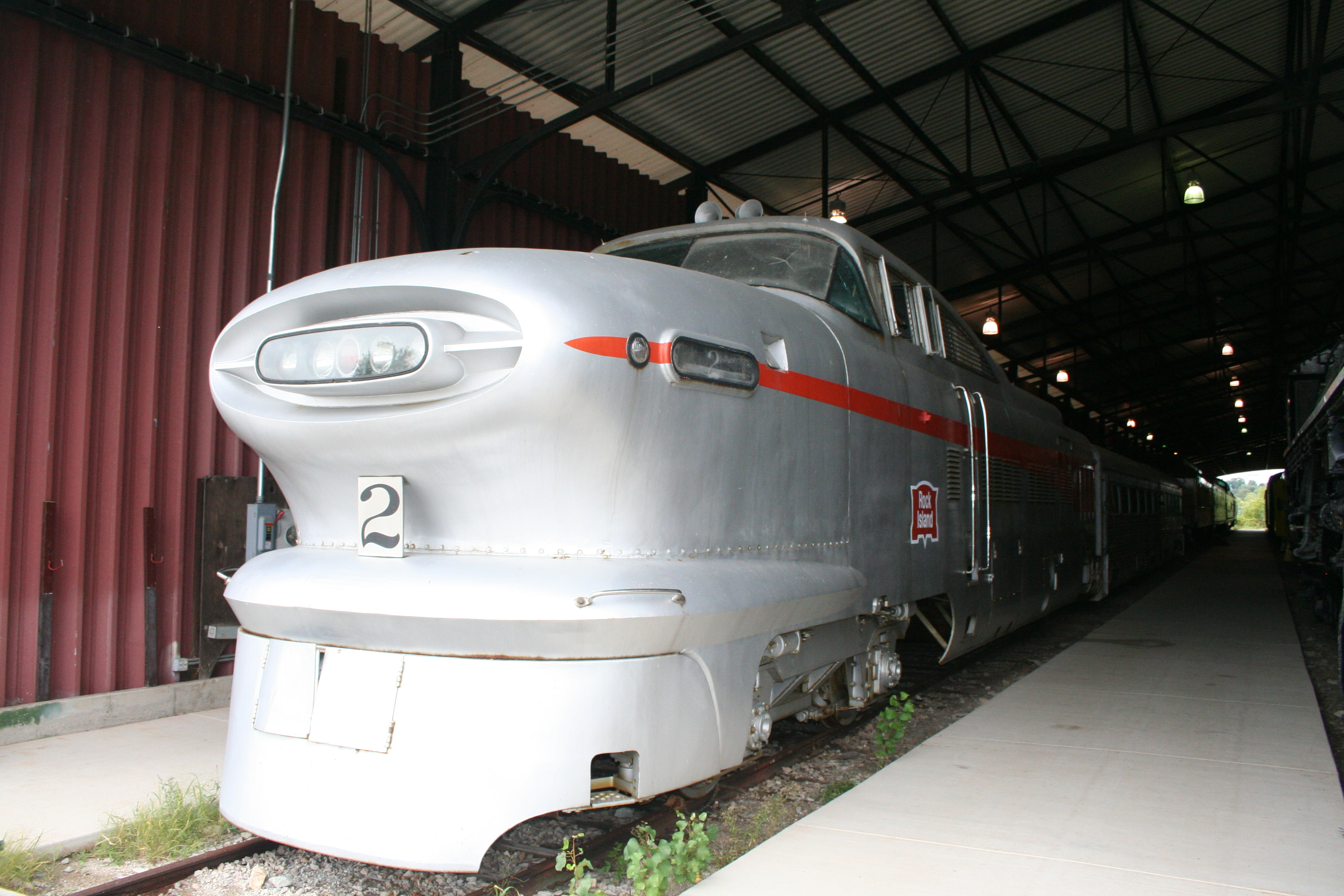
The Rock Island line's repainted Aerotrain No. 2 on display in the National Railroad Museum in Green Bay, Wisconsin (September 2010).

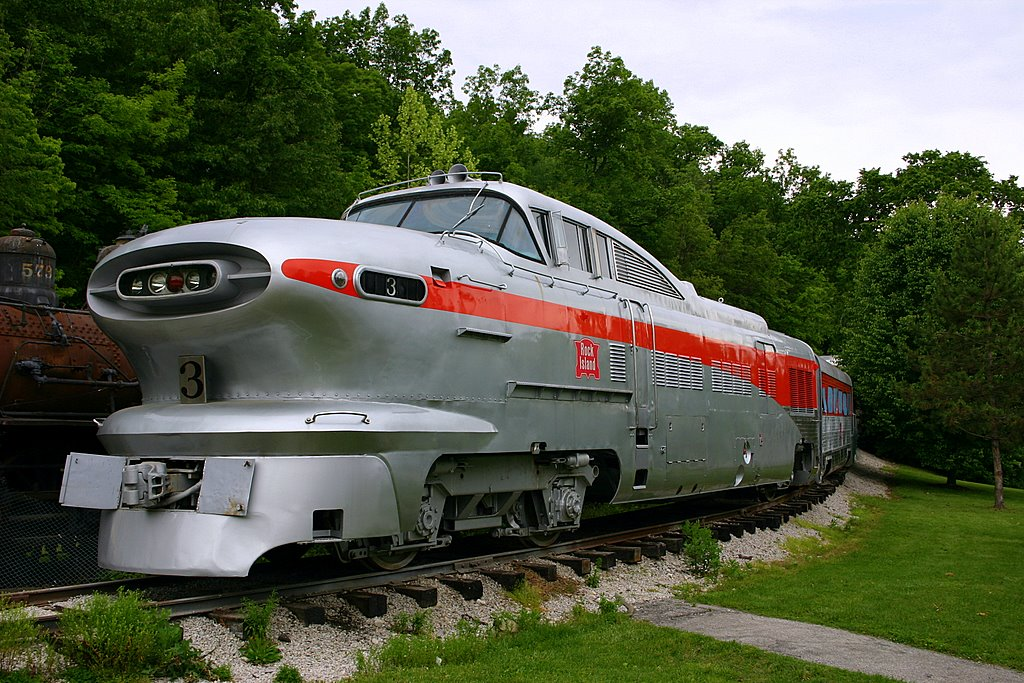
The Rock Island line's repainted Aerotrain No. 3 on display in the Museum of Transportation in Kirkwood, Missouri (May 2006).

The EMD LWT12 locomotives and two passenger cars of each of the two Aerotrains that GM constructed are now on display. The National Railroad Museum in Green Bay, Wisconsin, exhibits the Rock Island line's repainted Aerotrain locomotive number 2 and two of its coaches (parts of trainset number 2). The National Museum of Transportation in Kirkwood, Missouri (near St. Louis) exhibits the Rock Island's similarly repainted Aerotrain locomotive number 3 and two coaches (parts of trainset number 1). The designs on the repainted locomotives do not resemble those that the power cars bore when last serving the Rock Island line.

== Aerotrain legacy ==
Disneyland operated a scale version of the Aerotrain known as the Viewliner from 1957 to 1959. The Washington Park and Zoo Railway in Portland, Oregon, has operated a scale, diesel-powered replica of the Aerotrain (dubbed the Zooliner) to transport zoo visitors since 1958. Idlewild Park in Reno, Nevada, operates a small train whose locomotive is fashioned after that of the Aerotrain.

=== The Viewliner ===
On June 26, 1957, the narrow-gauge Santa Fe and Disneyland Viewliner (billed by Disneyland as "the fastest miniature train in the world") commenced operation. Two separate trains, designed and built as scale replicas of the futuristic Aerotrain, traveled a figure-eight track through parts of Tomorrowland and Fantasyland parallel to a portion of the Disneyland Railroad (DRR) main line. The Tomorrowland train featured cars that were named for the planets while the cars of the Fantasyland train were named after various Disney characters.

The modern, streamlined trains were placed in service to represent the future of rail travel in contrast to the steam-powered DRR which represented its past. Motive power for each train consisted of an integral head-end unit driven by an Oldsmobile "Rocket" V8 gasoline engine. Oldsmobile also furnished the windscreen, doors and instrument console for each of the two 5,000 lb (2,300 kg) locomotives. The attraction operated until September 15, 1958, when construction began on the Matterhorn and Submarine Voyage; the Disneyland Monorail System took the place of the Viewliner in June of the following year.

=== The Zooliner ===
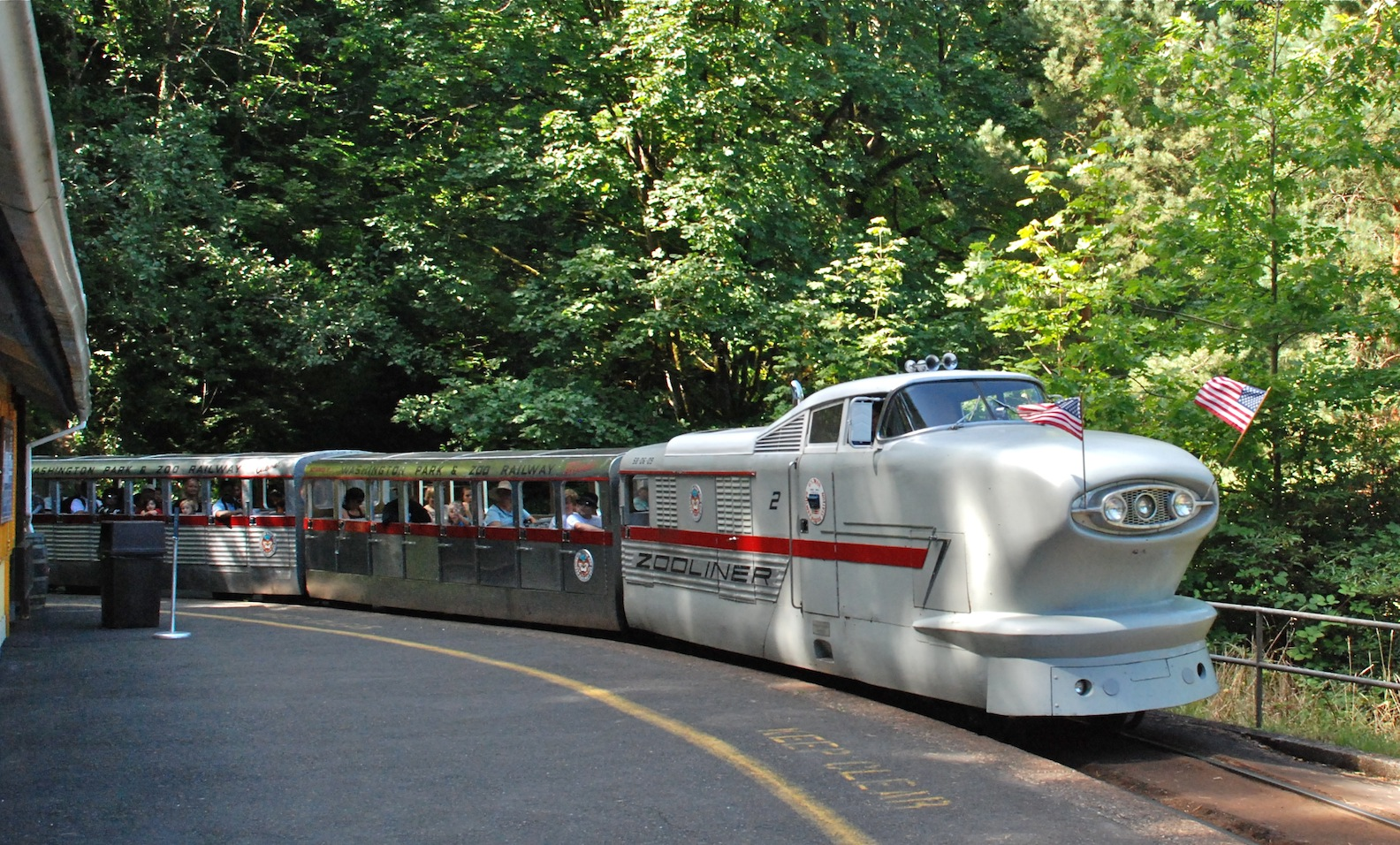
The Zooliner arriving at Washington Park station in September 2010

The Zooliner, one of three trains on the Washington Park and Zoo Railway operating in the Oregon Zoo in Portland, is a 5/8-scale replica of the Aerotrain. The Zooliner entered service in 1958. On June 14, 2008, the zoo held a "50th Birthday" celebration for the locomotive. The Zooliner remains the primary train for the zoo.

== Train-X ==
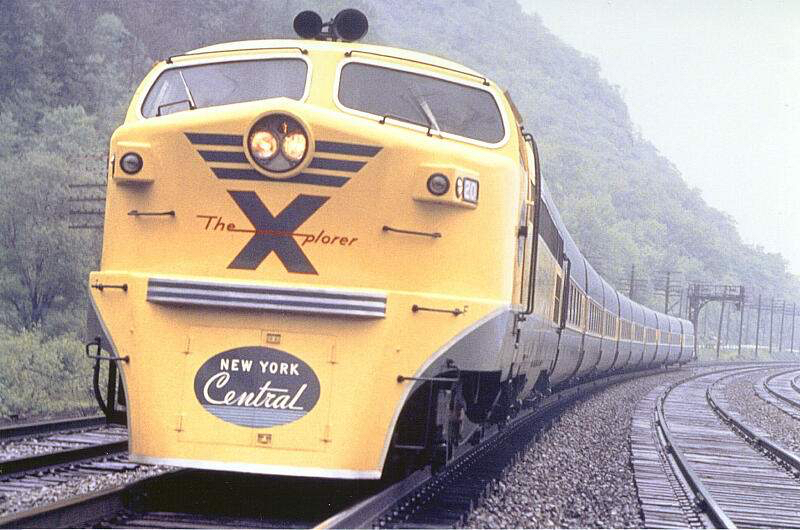
The New York Central Railroad's Ohio Xplorer in June 1956

Train-X was a lightweight set of nine short all-aluminum coaches articulated together that Pullman-Standard built and that two 1,000–horsepower Baldwin RP-210 diesel-hydraulic locomotives (one on each end) transported. The New York, New Haven and Hartford Railroad (the New Haven Railroad) operated as the Dan'l Webster the consist that the coaches and locomotives formed. The train traveled between New York City's Grand Central Terminal and Boston's South Station from 1957 to 1958.

A nearly identical train having only one locomotive ran between Cleveland and Cincinnati as the New York Central Railroad's Ohio Xplorer from 1956 to 1957. Timetables show that the Ohio Xplorer ran in 1956 during a time that the railroad was running the second Aerotrain trainset (the Great Lakes Aerotrain) between Cleveland and Chicago. The two left Cleveland at 6:45 and 6:35 a.m. respectively and returned during the evening.
