= FM P-12-42 =

American locomotive class

Fairbanks-Morse P-12-42
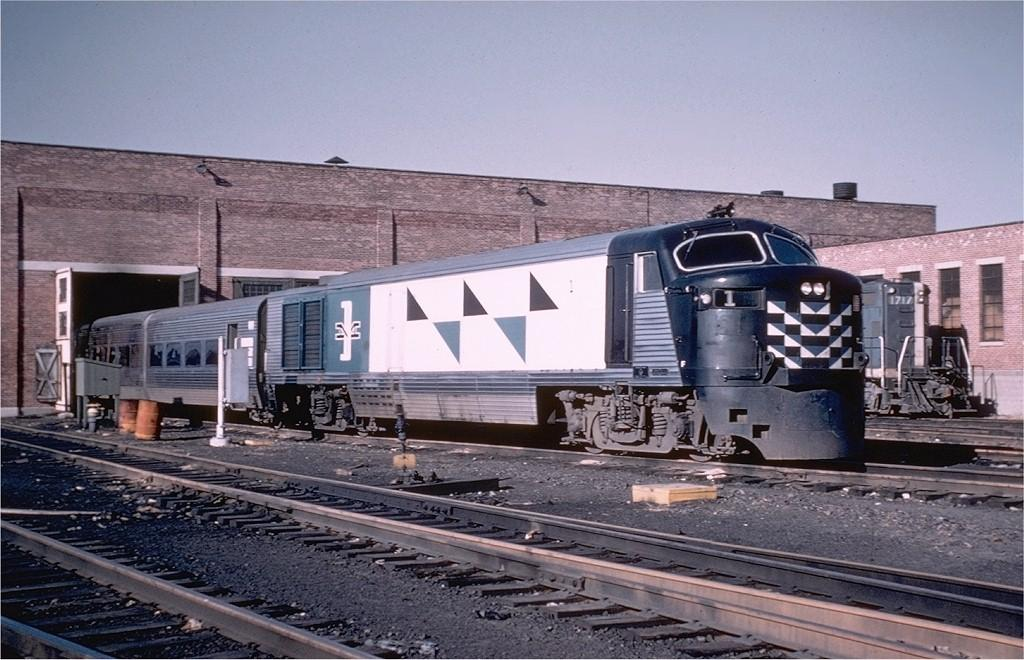
- An FM P-12-42, Boston and Maine Railroad #1
Type and origin
- Power type: Electro-diesel
- Builder: Fairbanks-Morse
- Serial number: 17L1058–17L1061
- Model: P-12-42
- Build date: 1957 (NH), 1958 (B&M)
- Total produced: 4
Specifications
- Configuration
  - AAR: B-2
  - UIC: B′2′
- Gauge: 4 ft 8 1/2 in (1,435 mm)
- Length: 60 ft 0 in (18.29 m)
- Width: 10 ft 6 in (3.20 m)
- Height: 12 ft 0 in (3.66 m)
- Loco weight: 200,000 lb (90.7 t)
- Electric system/s: 660 V DC Third rail (NH only)
- Current pickup: Contact shoe (NH only)
- Engine type: FM 38D-8 1/8
- Generator: DC Generator
- Traction motors: DC traction motors
- Cylinders: 8, Opposed piston
- Cylinder size: 8.125 in × 10 in (206 mm × 254 mm)
- Transmission: Diesel electric
- Train heating: 400 hp (300 kW) Head end power from prime mover
- Loco brake: Straight air
- Train brakes: Air
Performance figures
- Maximum speed: 117 miles per hour (188 km/h)
- Power output: 1,200 hp (890 kW) for traction
- Tractive effort: 50,000 lbf (222.4 kN)
Career
- Operators: Boston and Maine Railroad, New Haven
- Class: NH: EDER-7
- Numbers: B&M: 1–2, NH: 3100–3101
- Locale: North America
- Disposition: All scrapped

The P-12-42, also known as the Speed Merchant, was a streamlined, 1,200 hp (890 kW) locomotive built between 1957–1958 by Fairbanks-Morse, specifically to operate on each end of the Talgo train produced by American Car and Foundry. This model represented F-M's attempted entry into the lightweight locomotive market, but only four of the low-slung units were produced: the first pair was purchased by the New York, New Haven and Hartford Railroad for their John Quincy Adams train (New York, New York to Boston, Massachusetts), while the second pair went to the Boston and Maine Railroad for their Speed Merchant train (Boston, Massachusetts to Portland, Maine).

The P-12-42's eight-cylinder opposed piston engine was rated at 1,600 horsepower (1,200 kW) after 1950, but train lighting and other ancillary loads ("hotel" power) used about 25% of output, leaving 1,200 horsepower (890 kW) for traction. The 100-ton units measured 60 ft 0 in (18.29 m) long by 10 ft 6 in (3.20 m) wide by 12 ft 0 in (3.66 m) high, and were configured in a B-2 wheel arrangement mounted atop a pair of two-axle AAR road trucks, geared for 117 mph (188 km/h) with only the first two axles powered. The P-12-42 was one of the first locomotives to have its prime mover configured to run at a constant speed, with traction generator output regulated solely by excitation.

The New Haven locomotives were dual-powered, and came equipped with third-rail pickups to allow them to operate in New York's Grand Central Terminal, becoming the first dual-power locomotives light enough to operate on the Park Avenue Viaduct.

F-M expected to sell many more units to the New Haven, and to spin the technological advance off into a line of passenger units, including a proposal that used a Train Master-style carbody, but with financial troubles preventing F-M from extending financing to customers, the cash-strapped New Haven ultimately opted to purchase a fleet of sixty EMD FL9s instead, as GM financing was available for the purchase.

The New Haven's Talgo train was sold to Ferrocarril de Langreo for service in Spain, in 1962, and their locomotives sat unused afterwards, until being scrapped in 1971. The Boston and Maine's train remained in service until 1964.

== See also ==
- The Roger Williams, a lightweight, high speed DMU train, built for the New Haven.
- The Dan'l Webster, a lightweight train, operated by the New York, New Haven and Hartford Railroad.
