= EMD LWT12 =

Streamlined diesel locomotive

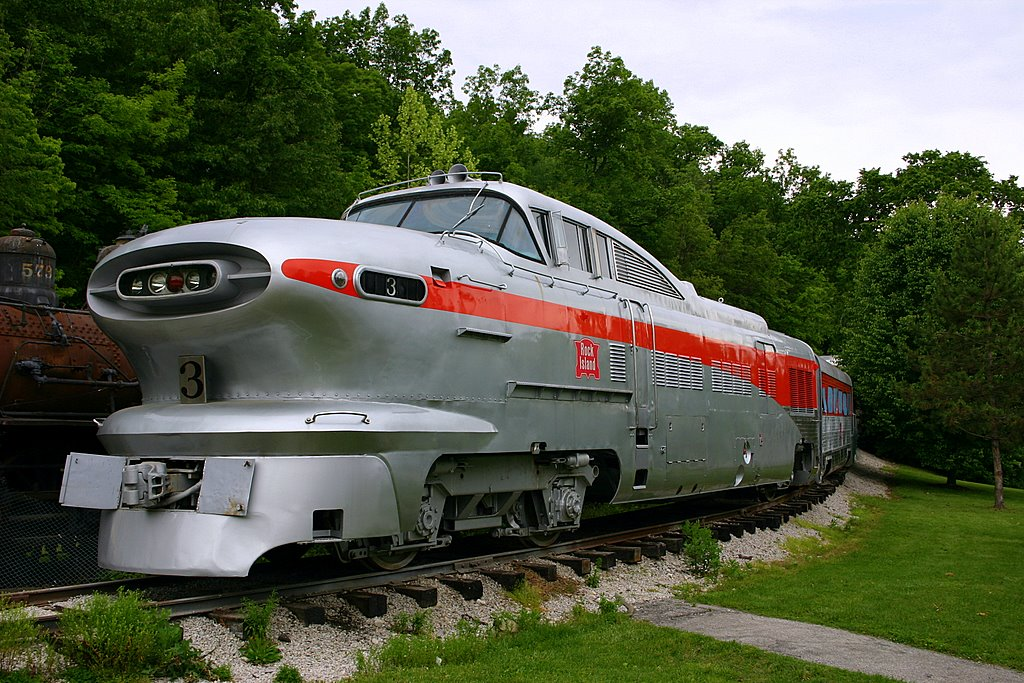
- A preserved EMD LWT12 at the National Museum of Transportation in St. Louis, Missouri
Type and origin
- Power type: Diesel-electric
- Designer: Chuck Jordan
- Builder: General Motors; Electro-Motive Division (EMD)
- Model: LWT12
- Build date: 1955
- Total produced: 3
Specifications
- Configuration
  - AAR: B-1
  - UIC: Bo'1'
- Gauge: 4 ft 8 1/2 in (1,435 mm) standard gauge
- Wheel diameter: 36 in (910 mm)
- Wheelbase: 9 ft (2.74 m)
- Length: 54 ft 5 in (16.59 m)
- Width: 10 ft 8 in (3.25 m)
- Height: 15 ft (4.57 m)
- Loco weight: 189,000 lb (86,000 kg; 86 t)
- Prime mover: EMD 12-567C
- Cylinders: 12
- Transmission: Diesel-electric
- Loco brake: straight air
- Train brakes: air
- Safety systems: air-actuated bell, air horn
Performance figures
- Maximum speed: 83 mph (134 km/h)
- Power output: 1,200 hp (890 kW)
Career
- Operators: Atchison, Topeka and Santa Fe Railway, Chicago, Rock Island and Pacific Railroad, New York Central Railroad, Pennsylvania Railroad, Union Pacific Railroad
- Locale: North America
- Disposition: Two preserved, one scrapped

The EMD LWT12 is a diesel–electric power car that was built in 1955 by General Motors Electro-Motive Division (EMD), to pull a lightweight passenger trainset. The General Motors Company developed both components under the project name, Train Y, but later marketed them as the Aerotrain. Diesel power was provided by an EMD 567C 12-cylinder engine, which produced 1,200 hp (890 kW). Two other GM Diesel engines provided current for train-heating, lighting and air-conditioning.

The LWT12 was underpowered, especially on grades, and the Santa Fe and Union Pacific Railroads were required to supply a "helper" unit to assist them in service. The LWT12 was essentially an EMD SW1200 switcher locomotive, suitably geared for high-speed passenger service (83 mph) and wrapped in a distinctive aerodynamic shell. Its industrial styling was inspired by the hoods and grills of futuristic automobiles then on GM's drawing boards.

Originally, the EMD LWT12 was intended to be part of an inseparable set along with ten specially designed high-speed, low-cost, 40-foot (12.19 m) passenger cars. These cars were built from bus bodies sourced from GM's GMC division which were then widened by 18 inches (457 mm), had their front and rear modified and were attached to a generic undercarriage.

The advantages of this design were that instead of refurbishing the whole carriage, the body mounted on the undercarriage would be scrapped in whole and a complete new modified bus body would be installed in its place with all of the different technical advances that had been developed, essentially resulting in a completely new car for a fraction of the cost. Also, all parts used by these carriages were sourced internally by GM and were also used in other products.

All of this meant that initial outlay, as well as maintenance costs, were significantly lower than traditional passenger cars resulting in a situation where railroad companies could offer rail fares similar to bus fares of the time. This design, as well as the EMD LWT12 were the cover feature article of the September 1955 Popular Mechanics magazine. Two of these whole train sets were built for the purpose of being driven across the United States for public viewing.

Only three LWT12 units were built. The first, EMD serial number 20826, entered service on the Chicago, Rock Island and Pacific Railroad (the Rock Island line) the Jet Rocket train between Chicago and Peoria. The unit later became the Rock Island's locomotive number 1. The American Car and Foundry Company constructed the train's Talgo II coaches.

The Rock Island preferred the single-axle Talgo cars over the double-axle GM bus-body coaches being built for the Aerotrain. But they were also drawn to the futuristic styling of GM's locomotive, over the more traditional look of the Fairbanks-Morse unit selected by ACF to pull the Talgo cars, so the railroad mated the two to form a unique lightweight consist of its own.

The second and third GM diesels, EMD serial numbers 21463 and 21464, powered the two GM Aerotrain demonstrators that toured the country in 1955, before being leased to four railroads for revenue service testing in 1956–1957. All of the roads rejected the Aerotrain, and the two GM demonstrators were eventually sold at great discount to the Rock Island Line, where they joined the Jet Rocket hybrid. Two of the three LWT12 locomotives continued in commuter service with the Aerotrain coaches, until retired in 1965.

The EMD LWT12 locomotives and several passenger cars of the two General Motors Aerotrains are presently on display within the United States. The National Railroad Museum in Green Bay, Wisconsin now exhibits the Chicago, Rock Island and Pacific Railroad's Aerotrain locomotive number 2. The National Museum of Transportation in Kirkwood, Missouri (near St. Louis) exhibits the Rock Island's Aerotrain locomotive number 3 and two passenger cars.

== See also ==
- List of GM-EMD locomotives
- EMD SW1200
