= EMD SW1200 =

Model of 1200 hp American diesel switcher

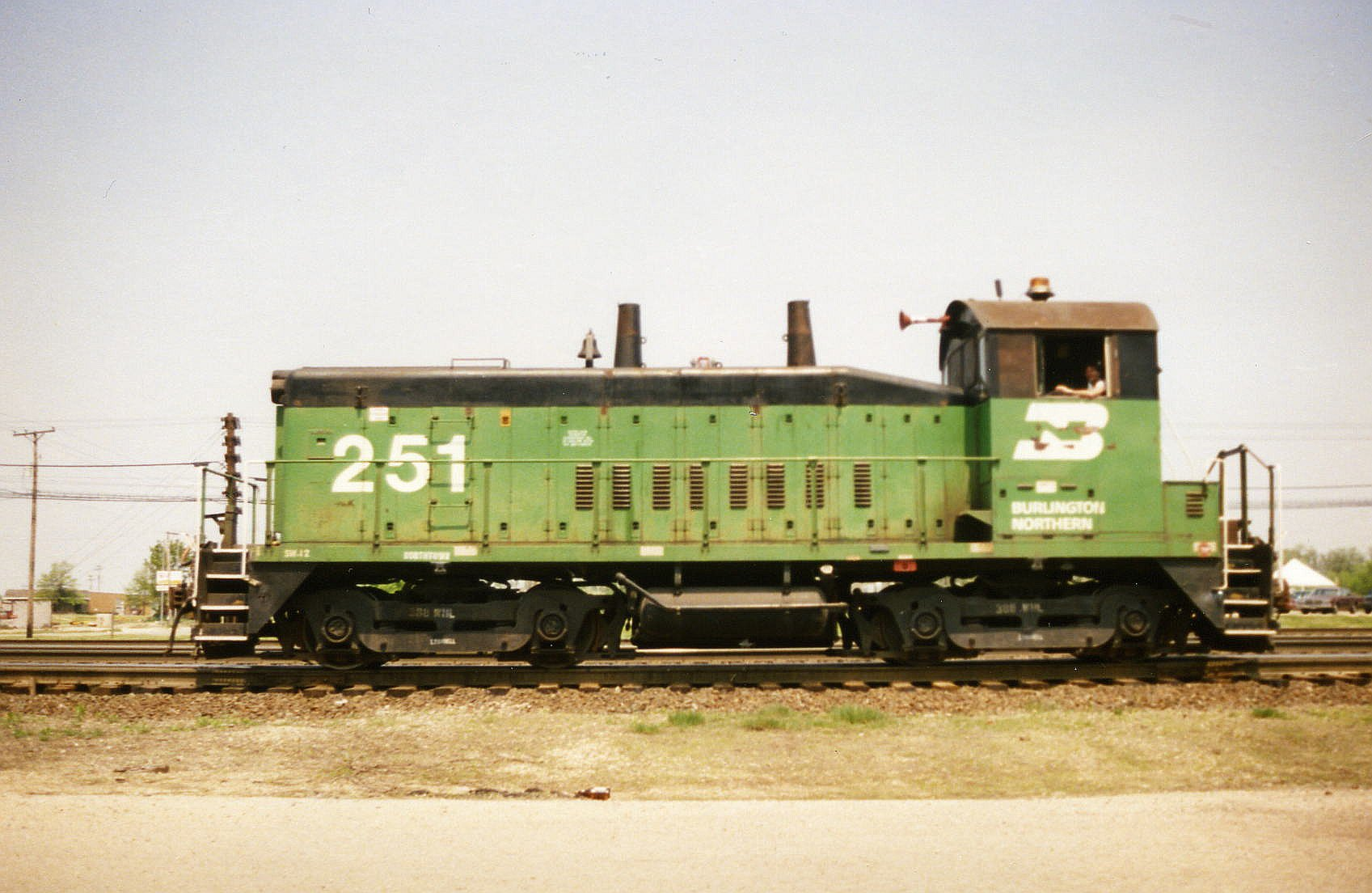
- BN 251, an EMD SW1200, works the yard in Eola, Illinois (just east of Aurora)
Type and origin
- Power type: Diesel–electric
- Builder: General Motors Electro-Motive Division, General Motors Diesel, Canada
- Model: SW1200
- Build date: January 1954 – May 1966
- Total produced: 1,052
Specifications
- Configuration
  - AAR: B-B
  - UIC: Bo′Bo′
- Gauge: 4 ft 8 1/2 in (1,435 mm) standard gauge; 1,000 mm (3 ft 3 3/8 in) metre gauge, Chile; 5 ft (1,524 mm)(?), Panama; 4 ft 8 1/2 in (1,435 mm) standard gauge, Brazil
- Prime mover: EMD 12-567C
- Engine type: V12 diesel
- Cylinders: 12
Performance figures
- Power output: 1,200 hp (890 kW)
Career
- Locale: North America, South America
- Disposition: Many scrapped, many still in use

An EMD SW1200 is a four-axle diesel switcher locomotive built by General Motors Electro-Motive Division between January 1954 and May 1966. Power is provided by an EMD 567C 12-cylinder engine, which generates 1,200 horsepower (890 kW). Additional SW1200 production was completed by General Motors Diesel in Ontario, Canada, between September 1955 and June 1964.

737 examples of this locomotive model were built for U.S. railroads, 287 were built for Canadian railroads, four were built for Brazilian railroads, 25 were built for a Chilean industrial firm, and three were built for the Panama Canal Railway.

== Design and production ==
The SW1200 was the third model of 1,200 hp SW series switchers built by EMD. It was a successor to the SW7 and SW9. Compared to its direct predecessor, the SW9, the SW1200 differed in that it used the improved and more reliable 567C engine, compared to the SW9's 567B engine. Late SW1200s built in 1966 were instead built with the 567E 12-cylinder engine. Most of the locomotive's external features were unchanged from the SW9, making distinguishing between the two models difficult. The new "1200" model number was a reflection of EMD's change to a more horsepower-based model naming system at the time.

SW1200 production began in January 1954, immediately after SW9 production came to an end the previous month. Production continued for 12 years until the last SW1200 left EMD's manufacturing facility in May 1966.

Like many EMD products, customers could customize their SW1200 orders. Several options were available, including Flexicoil trucks. A few units were built with dynamic brakes, featuring a large square box with a fan on top of the hood, right in front of the cab.

== Variants ==
A cow–calf variation, the TR12, was cataloged, but none were built.

An SW1200RS (RS for road switcher) is a variation of the standard SW1200 that features large front and rear (on some units) number board housings, EMD Flexicoil B-B trucks, and larger fuel tanks for road switcher service. The majority of the Canadian National and Canadian Pacific SW1200 fleets were purchased as SW1200RS units. SW1200RS units were produced near the end of SW1200 production in the mid-1960s.

== Original buyers ==
=== Units built by Electro-Motive Division, United States ===
Railroad	Quantity	Road numbers	Notes
Aliquippa and Southern Railroad	13	1201–1213	
Amapa Railway	4	1–4	Brazil
Ashley, Drew and Northern Railway	2	176, 178	
Atchison, Topeka and Santa Fe Railway	3	2439–2441	
Baltimore and Ohio Railroad	8	9614–9621	
Bauxite and Northern Railway	1	11	Sold to Missouri Pacific in 1964 and renumbered to MP No. 1260. Sold to Precision National Corp in 1985. Sold to the Columbia Terminal Railroad in 1987 and renumbered to COLT No. 1.
Bellefonte Central Railroad	1	5624	
Belt Railway of Chicago	3	524–526	
Birmingham Southern Railroad	2	200–201	
Chicago and Illinois Midland Railroad	6	18–23	
Chicago and North Western Railway	12	310–321	Acquired by EJ&E Railway then to Gary Railway (315 and 316 not part of GRW fleet)
Chicago, Burlington and Quincy Railroad	22	9271–9292	to Burlington Northern 229–250
Chicago, Milwaukee, St. Paul and Pacific Railroad ("Milwaukee Road")	48	1637–1642, 2020–2061	Renumbered 600–619, 625–652 (not in order)
Chicago, Rock Island and Pacific Railroad	17	920–936	
Chile Exploration Company	25	911–935	Chile
Colorado and Southern Railway	5	156–160	to Burlington Northern Same
Commonwealth Edison	1	16	
Conemaugh and Black Lick Railroad	2	120–121	
Coos Bay Lumber Company	3	1201–1203	Built with dynamic brakes.
Cuyahoga Valley Railway	7	1280–1286	
Delaware, Lackawanna and Western Railroad	8	561–568	to Erie Lackawanna 456–463
Denver and Rio Grande Western Railroad	10	130–139	133 preserved
De Queen and Eastern Railroad	1	D-5	
Elgin, Joliet and Eastern Railway	8	300–307	300–301, 303–305 and 307 are now part of the Gary Railway Co. fleet per the 2009 CN acquisition of EJ&E Railway. 306 to LTEX 306
Florida East Coast Railway	7	229–235	
Fort Worth and Denver Railway	4	607–610	to Burlington Northern Same
Grand Trunk Western Railroad	18	1269–1270, 1505–1508, 1511–1519, 7017–7019	
Great Lakes Steel Corporation	16	16, 39–53	
Great Northern Railway	6	29–33, 100	100 Rebuilt from EMC NC to Burlington Northern 162–166
Houston Belt and Terminal Railway	5	33–37	
Illinois Terminal Railroad	12	775–786	
Inland Steel Company	23	88–98, 103–114	
Kansas City Terminal Railway	10	70–79	
Lake Superior Terminal and Transfer	1	105	
Louisville and Nashville Railroad	4	2297–2300	
Midland Electric Coal Company	1	1201	
Minneapolis, Northfield and Southern Railway	6	30–35	to Soo Line
Minneapolis, St. Paul and Sault Ste. Marie Railroad, ("Soo Line")	8	321–328	321, 323 and 324 were acquired by EJ&E Ry then part of Gary Ry Co. One unit acquired by Tulsa-Sapulpa Union Railway, now in active service as its Number 108.
Soo Line (Wisconsin Central Railroad)	8	2120–2127	
Missouri Pacific Railroad	116	1100–1166, 1175–1201, 1255–1259, 1263–1279	Withdrawn in 1985 after the UP takeover. Sold to various owners or scrapped.
Missouri Pacific (Texas and Pacific Railway)	20	1280–1299	Withdrawn in 1985 after the UP takeover. Sold to various owners or scrapped.
Missouri–Kansas–Texas Railroad	8	1–6, 43–44	
New York, New Haven and Hartford Railroad	20	640–659	to Penn Central 9180–9199 and then Conrail 9363–9382
New Orleans Public Belt Railroad	2	71–72	
Norfolk and Portsmouth Belt Line Railroad	15	101–115	
Northern Pacific Railway	59	119–177	to Burlington Northern 170–228
Oliver Iron Mining Company	9	940–948	
Pacific Power and Light	1	10	
Panama Canal Railway	3	661–663	
Patapsco and Back Rivers Railroad	10	125–134	
Pennsylvania Railroad	35	7900–7934	To Penn Central
Peoria and Pekin Union Railway	1	500	
Philadelphia, Bethlehem and New England Railroad	5	39–43	
Reading Company	5	2715–2719	Equipped with 930 Gal. Fuel tanks
Republic Steel Corporation	2	362, 895	
Reserve Mining Company	1	1212	
Richmond, Fredericksburg and Potomac Railroad	5	81–85	
River Terminal Railway	2	63–64	
Rockdale, Sandow and Southern Railroad	2	8–9	
Sandersville Railroad	1	200	renumbered 1200, upgraded to 12–645 spec
Simpson Logging Company	2	1200–1201	Built with Dynamic Brakes.
Southern Pacific Transportation Company	27	1597–1623	renumbered 2262–2288
Southern Pacific (Texas and New Orleans Railroad)	12	113–118, 123–128	renumbered 2213–2223
St. Louis Southwestern Railway ("Cotton Belt")	17	1062–1073, 2289–2293	1062–1073 renumbered to 2250–2261
Steelton and Highspire Railroad	1	44	
Terminal Railroad Association of St. Louis	25	1219–1243	
Tooele Valley Railway	1	100	
U.S. Steel	2	SX1–SX2	
Wabash Railroad	5	375–379	
West Virginia Northern Railroad	1	52	Built with dynamic brakes.
Weyerhaeuser Timber Company	1	304	
Wheeling Steel	7	1250, 1254–1259	
Woodward Iron Company	1	52	
Total	765		

=== Units built by General Motors Diesel, Canada ===
Railroad	Quantity	Road numbers	Notes
Canadian Forest Products	3	301–303	Flexicoil trucks, built with dynamic brakes
Canadian National Railway	208	1227–1268, 1271–1397, 1575–1597, 7020–7035	12/13/1500s have Flexicoil trucks and numberboards at both ends. Some units rebuilt to SW1200RMs
Canadian Pacific Railway	72	8100–8171	Flexicoil trucks, numberboards at front only
Dominion Foundries and Steel ("Dofasco")	1	14	
Essex Terminal Railway	1	105	
Quebec Iron and Titanium	1	5	Romaine River Ry
Roberval and Saguenay Railway	1	23	
Total	287		

== Preservation ==
Rio Grande No. 133 was acquired by the Promontory Chapter of the National Railway Historical Society which arrived to the Utah State Railroad Museum in 2025 on a two-year loan. Restoration work is now underway to return the locomotive to its as-built appearance.

Two Milwaukee Road units, Nos. 606 and 615, are preserved, 606 at the Tennessee Valley Railroad Museum and 615 at the Oklahoma Railway Museum

== See also ==
- EMD LWT12
- List of GMD Locomotives
- List of GM-EMD locomotives
