= Fresno de la Vega =

Fresno de la Vega Fresnu de la Veiga
- municipality
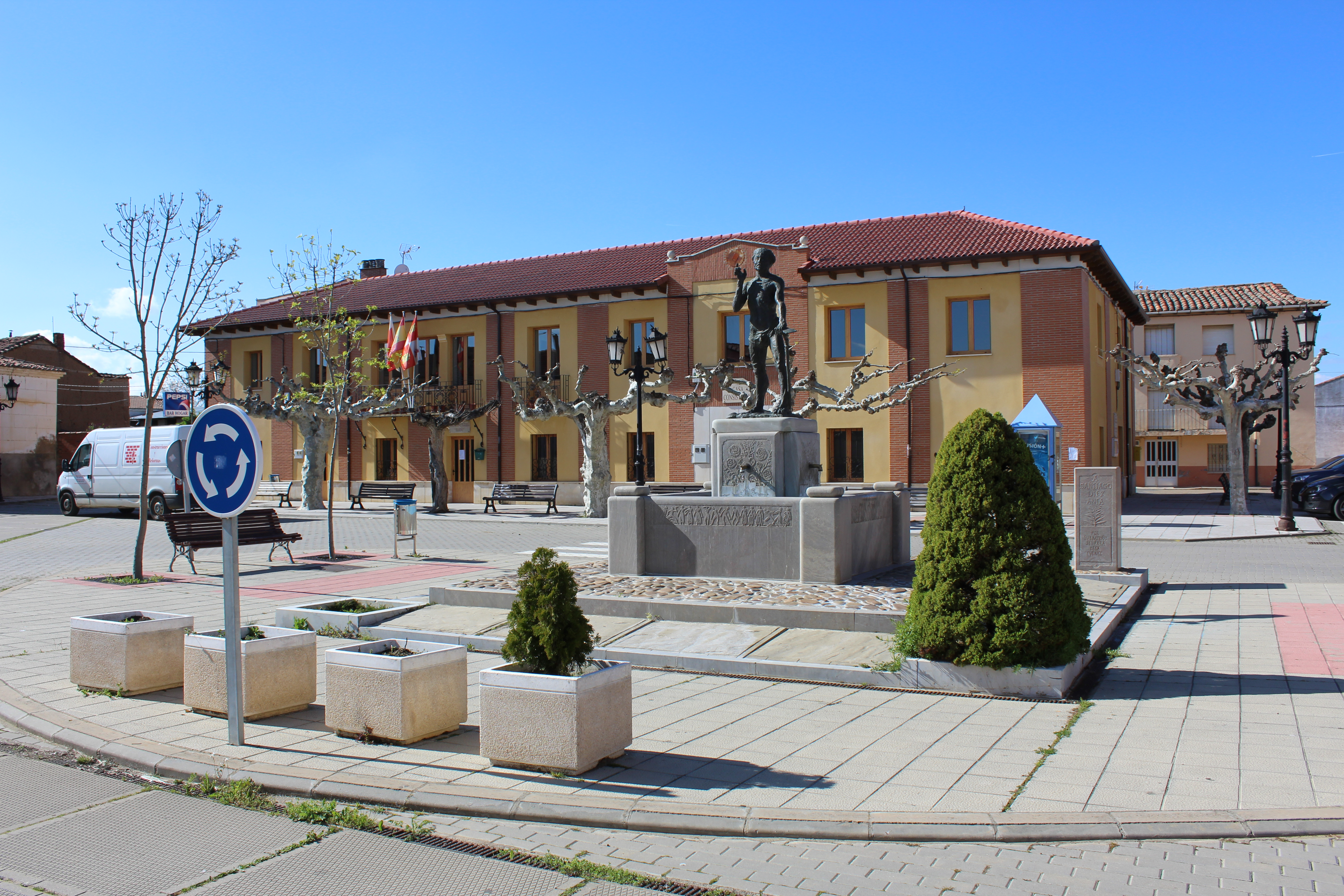
- Town hall

- Coat of arms

- Location within Spain
- Coordinates: 42°20′43″N 5°32′1″W
- Country: Spain
- Autonomous community: Castile and León
- Province: León
- Municipality: Fresno de la Vega

Government
  - Mayor: Antonio Lozano Andrés (PSOE)

Area
  - Total: 15.14 km^{2} (5.85 sq mi)
- Elevation: 753 m (2,470 ft)

Population (2025-01-01)
  - Total: 483
  - Density: 31.9/km^{2} (82.6/sq mi)
- Time zone: UTC+1 (CET)
  - Summer (DST): UTC+2 (CEST)
- Postal Code: 24223
- Telephone prefix: 987
- Climate: Cfb
- Website: Ayto. de Fresno de la Vega

Fresno de la Vega (Spanish pronunciation: [ˈfɾesno ðe la ˈβeɣa]), Fresnu de la Veiga in Leonese language, is a municipality located in the province of León, Castile and León, Spain. According to the 2004 census (INE), the municipality has a population of 645 inhabitants. Fresno is known locally for its unique variety of large Spanish peppers, called morrón. The village has a small market which sells retail quantities of locally grown produce. During the last Sunday of September the village hosts a 'Pepper Fair'.
