= Speed Merchant =

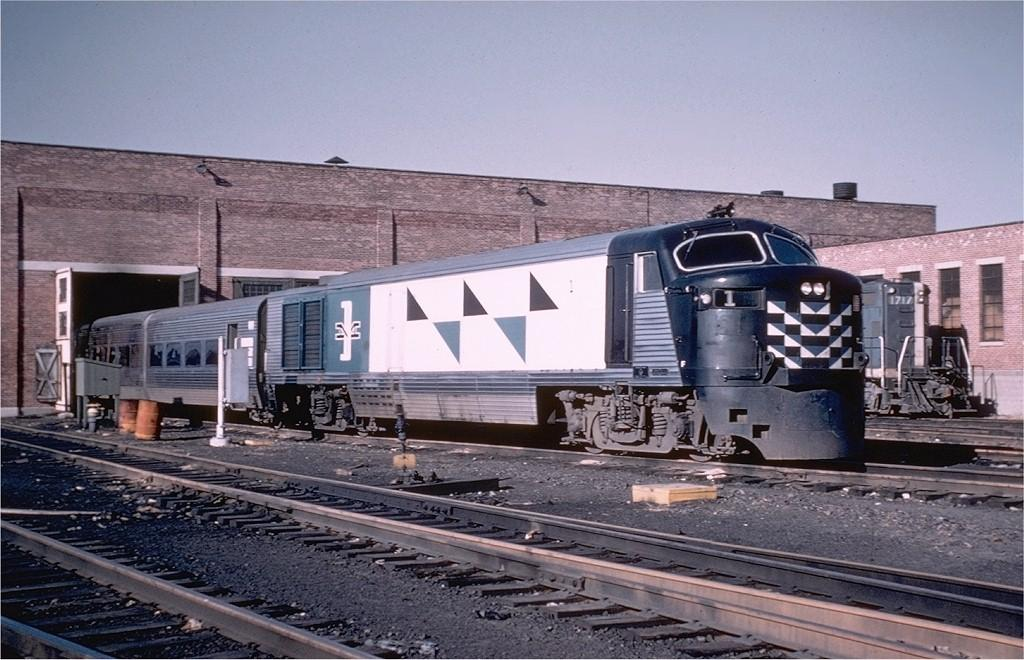
An FM P-12-42, Boston and Maine Railroad #1, at Boston Engine Terminal, between 1958 and 1962

The Speed Merchant or Talgo Train was a bi-directional top and tail five-car train used by the Boston and Maine Railroad in commuter service between 1958 and 1964 on the road's Eastern and Western routes. Power for the train was from two Fairbanks-Morse P-12-42 diesel-electric locomotives, one at each end of the train, connected by multiple-unit control. Fairbanks-Morse referred to the locomotives as "Speed Merchants" in its promotional literature, but the Boston and Maine never used this; B&M timetables simply called it the "Talgo Train" in advance announcements but, once the train entered service, no names were attached in the printed schedules.

The Talgo Train was purchased by the Patrick B. McGinnis administration of the B&M, and was virtually identical to the John Quincy Adams, one of three experimental passenger trains purchased by the New Haven Railroad (under McGinnis) in an attempt to modernize rail travel and lure people out of their cars. The cars were built by American Car and Foundry to a lightweight Talgo design.

The train consisted of five articulated cars, each made up of three short segments. The center car of each section had two axles (one at each end), with the remaining cars having a single axle each, being supported by adjacent cars at the end opposite the axle. The ride was rough, as with most of the other lightweight trains of the period, and the train was not a success.

Service lasted until 1964.

== See also ==
- Downeaster (train), the Amtrak train that currently runs between Boston and Portland
- John Quincy Adams (train)
