= Ohio Xplorer =

American named passenger train (1956–1957)

Xplorer
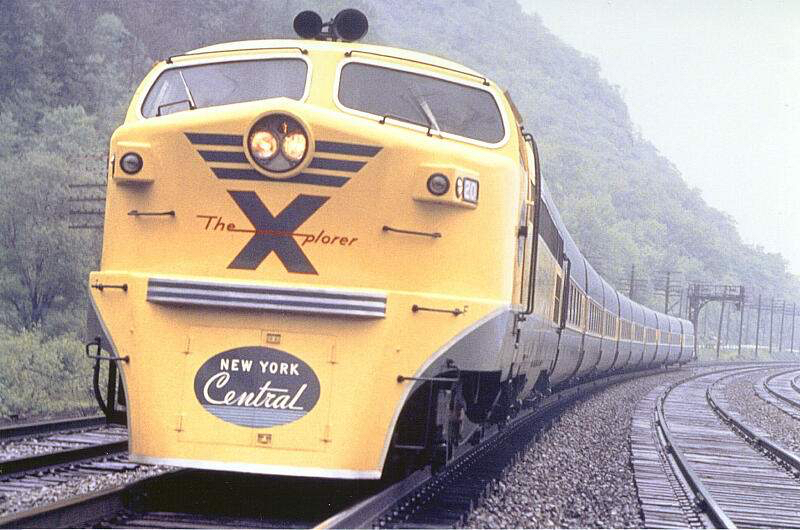
- The New York Central Railroad's Xplorer on June 4, 1956

Overview
- Service type: Inter-city rail
- Status: Discontinued
- Locale: Midwestern United States
- First service: 1956
- Last service: 1957
- Former operator: New York Central Railroad

Route
- Termini: Cincinnati, Ohio; Cleveland, Ohio
- Distance travelled: 290.0 miles (466.7 km)
- Service frequency: Daily
- Train numbers: 421: southwest-bound; 422: northeast-bound

On-board services
- Seating arrangements: Reclining seat coaches
- Catering facilities: Food service
- Observation facilities: Lounge coach

Technical
- Track gauge: 1,435 mm (4 ft 8 1/2 in)

The Xplorer, or Ohio Xplorer, was a named train of the New York Central Railroad (NYC) that traveled between Cleveland and Cincinnati, Ohio. Although the railroad first announced the train in its April 29, 1956, timetable, that timetable did not contain its schedule. The train entered revenue service on June 3, 1956.

== Equipment ==
The Pullman-Standard Car Manufacturing Company constructed the train's streamlined coaches to its lightweight Train-X design. A Baldwin RP-210 diesel-hydraulic locomotive pulled the train's consist.

The train contained the locomotive and nine short all-aluminum coaches that were articulated together. The center car had two axles (one at each end), with the remaining cars having a single axle each, being supported by adjacent cars at the end opposite the axle. The ride was rough, as with most of the other lightweight trains of the period, and the train was not a success.

== Operations ==
The NYC's July 15, 1956, timetable was the first to contain the train's schedule. The train, numbered 421 southwest-bound and 422 northeast-bound on the timetable, was an attempt by the New York Central to modernize intrastate rail travel in Ohio and lure people out of their cars.

The train made its last run on August 17, 1957, after less than 15 months of operations. As a result, the train's name (Ohio-Xplorer or Xplorer) did not appear on the railroad's October 27, 1957, timetable.

The equipment was retired in 1960, and was sold to Jones Tours for excursion service. After a long period of storage in South Carolina, the train and locomotive were scrapped around 1970.

== See also ==
- Ohio Hub
- Ohio State Limited
