= Íñigo López de Mendoza, 1st Count of Tendilla =

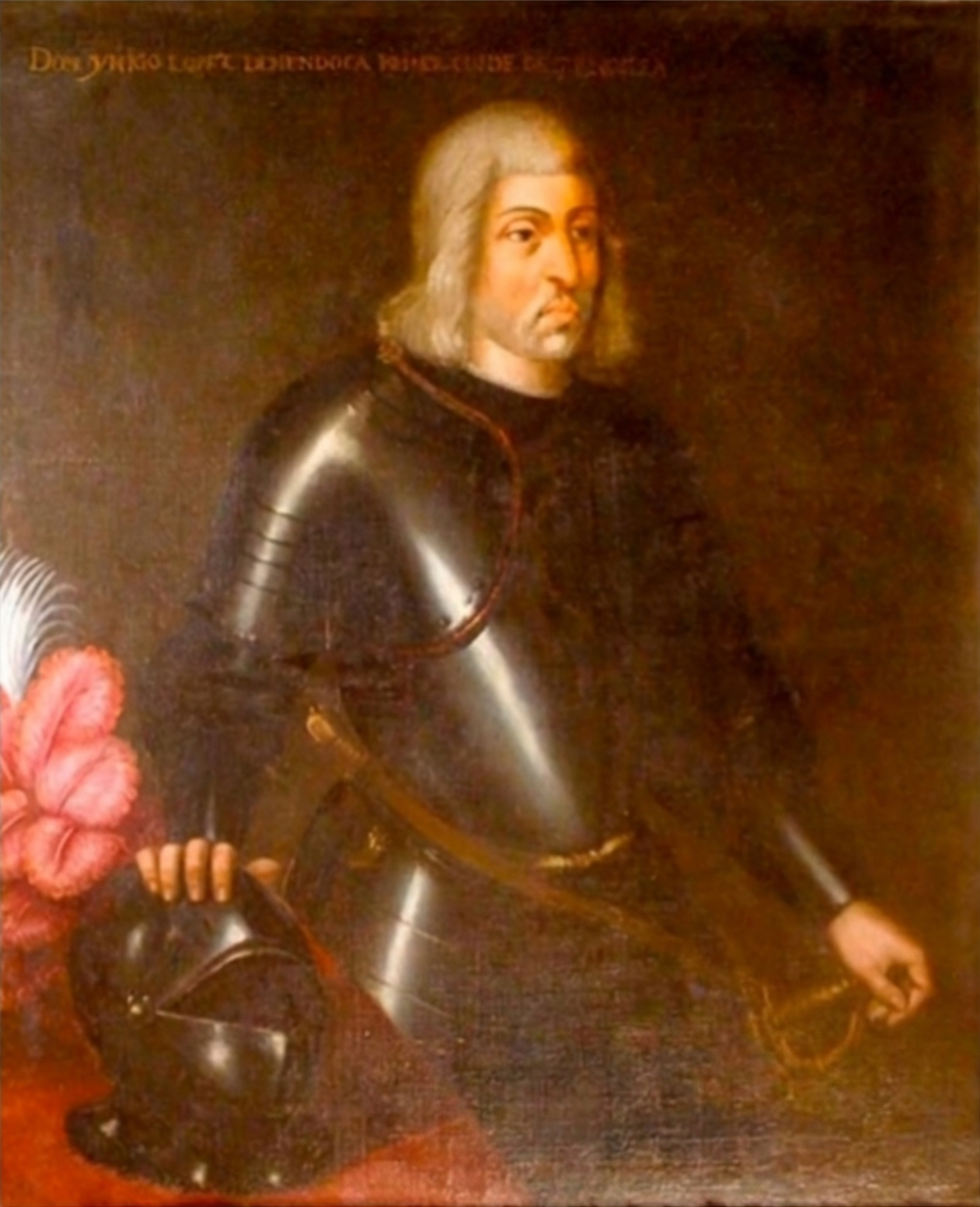
Portrait of the count of Tendilla.

Íñigo López de Mendoza (1419 – 17 February 1479 in Tendilla, province of Guadalajara, Spain) was the second son of famous Spanish Poet and nobleman Íñigo López de Mendoza y Lasso de la Vega, marquis of Santillana, (1398–1458), and the cadet brother of Diego Hurtado de Mendoza, 1. duque of l'Infantado, (1417 - title awarded 22 July 1475 - 1479), the brother also of Archbishop and Cardinal Pedro González de Mendoza, (May 3, 1428 – January 11, 1495), named by his contemporaries "the third king of Spain".

He married Leonese lady Elvira de Quiñones, fighting in 1438, aged 19, in the conquest of Huelma, in the Nasri kingdom of Granada, near the border with the Jaén Christian territories and in 1445 in the First Battle of Olmedo, May 1445. When his father, Íñigo, 1st marquis of Santillana died in 1458, he received the village of Tendilla as well as Aranzueque, Armuña de Tajuña and Fuentelviejo being awarded in 1470 the title of Señor, (Sieur) of Huete, buying in 1475 Loranca de Tajuña to the count of Medinaceli, Luis de la Cerda, 1st duke of Medinaceli, dukedom awarded to his neighbor by ruling Queen Isabel I of Castile and her ruling husband Fernando II de Aragón on 31 October 1479.

He had two sons:

- Íñigo López de Mendoza y Quiñones, (Guadalajara, Castile, 1440 - † Palace of the Alhambra, Granada, Spain, 20 July 1515), 2nd Count of Tendilla and 1st Marquis of Mondéjar, in 1512
- Diego Hurtado de Mendoza y Quiñones, Archbishop of Sevilla (from 26 Aug 1485 - 14 Oct 1502), no new nomination till May 1503, (for political troubles?).

Both names were much used for centuries in the complicated Mendoza family.

== More about his eldest son ==
It is perhaps worth saying that the Leonese mother Elvira de Quiñones brought to her marriage half of the village of Mondéjar, province of Guadalajara and that her eldest son, later Governor of the Alhambra Palace in conquered Granada, relatively tolerant for a few years with the Spanish Berbers settled there, would be awarded in 1512 by newly married king Fernando II of Aragón, the title of Marquis of Mondéjar, his mother apport to her marriage.

The 2nd count of Tendilla, his eldest son, later 1st marquis of Mondéjar, was named also Íñigo López de Mendoza y Quiñones, and is not to be confused with his cousin Íñigo López de Mendoza y Luna, 2nd Duke of the Infantado (1438–1500).

Later in history, there was also Íñigo López de Mendoza, 4th Duke of the Infantado (1493–1566), and his grandson Íñigo López de Mendoza, 5th Duke of the Infantado (1536–1601).
