= Adelantado mayor of Castile =

Noble title in medieval Castile, Spain

The adelantado mayor of Castile (Spanish: adelantado mayor de Castilla) was an officer in service to the Crown of Castile who was entrusted with some judicial and military powers in the Kingdom of Castile.

== History ==
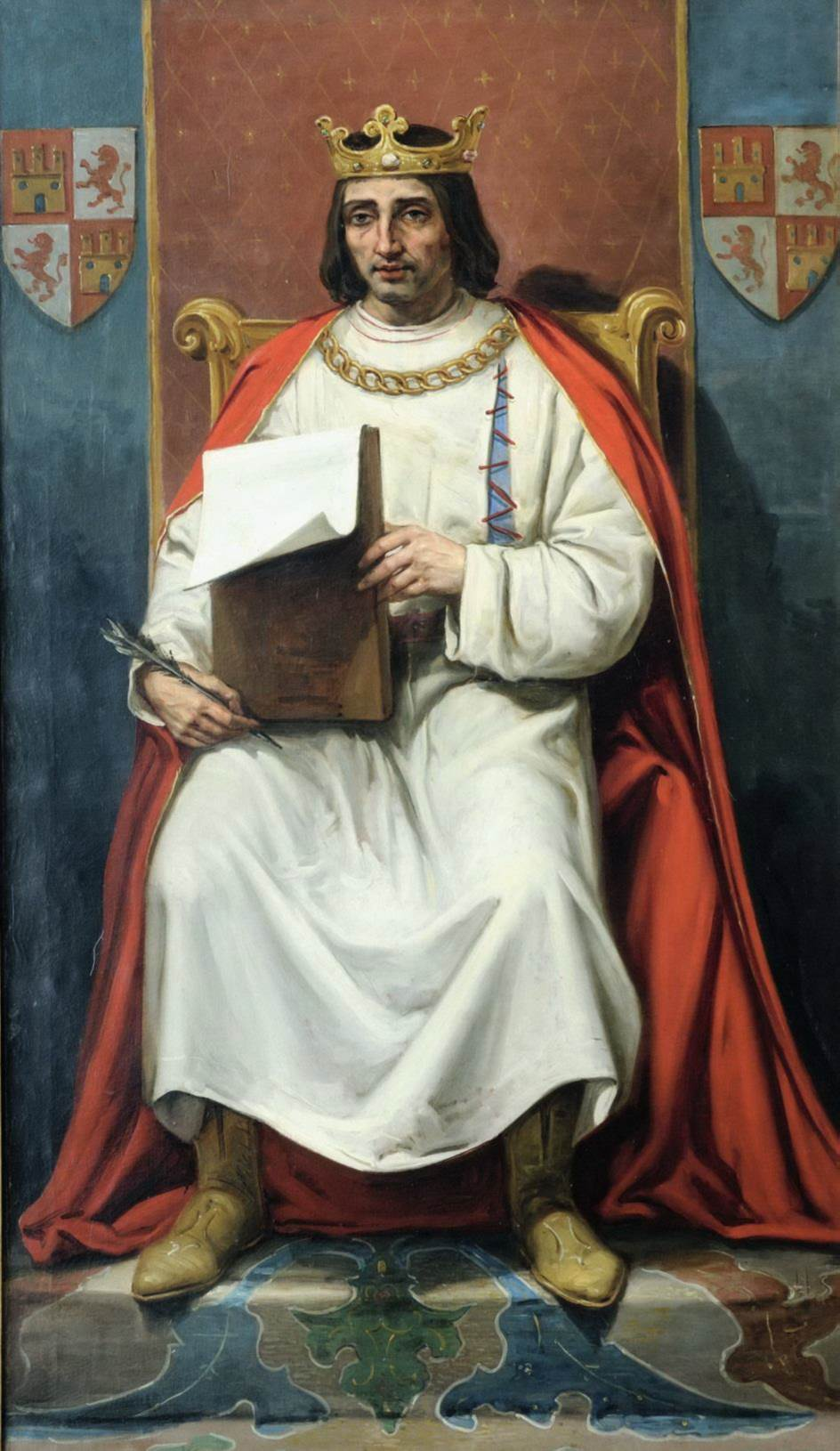
Portrait of Alfonso X of Castile, by José María Rodríguez de Losada (León City Hall)

Lamingueiro Fernández stated that since the 10th and 11th centuries, the Leonese monarchs tried to make their presence effective throughout their jurisdiction, for which reason they created the greater and lesser merinos, the tenants-in-chief, the alfoces and later, in the mid-13th-century reign of Alfonso X of Castile, the adelantados, in order to enforce their policies.

By the reign of Ferdinand III of Castile the jurisdictions of the greater and lesser merinos were already fully defined. The first were high-ranking officials of the Crown, with extensive legal-administrative powers, and with powers directly from the king. It was also Ferdinand III who appointed greater merinos for the Kingdom of Castile and later for those of León, Galicia, and Murcia.

After the death of Ferdinand III, his son and heir Alfonso X maintained the same administrative divisions that had existed during his father's reign and thus, all his territories continued to be divided into four major merindades. In 1253 the Greater Adelantado of Andalusia (Spanish: adelantado mayor de la frontera) was created for the territories bordering the Emirate of Granada. In 1258, five years later, the greater merinos of León, Castile, and Murcia were replaced by greater adelantados, and in 1263 the greater adelantado of Galicia was also named to replace its greater merino.

The famous writer and magnate Don Juan Manuel, who was the grandson of King Ferdinand III and would become the Greater Adelantado of Murcia and also of Andalusia, came to affirm in his Book of States and to his father, the Infante Manuel of Castile, that:

Señor Infante, all of this that I say to you regarding the Adelantados, you must understand the same about the Merinos, because that is the same thing, and there is no other department, but in some lands they are called Adelantados and in others Merinos...

The Greater Adelantado of Castile would end up being inherited in the 15th century by the Padilla family, future counts of Santa Gadea. The heritability of the office caused it to become a more honorary rather than effective title, and from then on the greater adelantados gained more importance. It was an itinerant office that in 1502, due to its size, was divided into two parts: that of Campos and that of Burgos. The archive of Burgos was kept in one of the gates of the wall of Covarrubias that Philip II ordered to be built.

== List of Greater Adelantados of Castile ==
=== Reign of Alfonso X (1252–1284) ===
- Pedro Núñez de Guzmán or Pedro Guillén de Guzmán (1258–1269), son of Guillén Pérez de Guzmán and María González Girón.

=== Reign of Sancho IV (1284–1295) ===
- Diego López V de Haro (1287), Lord of Biscay, and Alférez and High Steward of Ferdinand IV of Castile. He was the son of Diego López III de Haro and Constanza de Bearne, and the brother of Count Lope Díaz III de Haro, who was also Lord of Biscay and High Steward of Sancho IV of Castile.
- Juan Fernández de Villamayor (1288–1295).

=== Reign of Ferdinand IV (1295–1312) ===
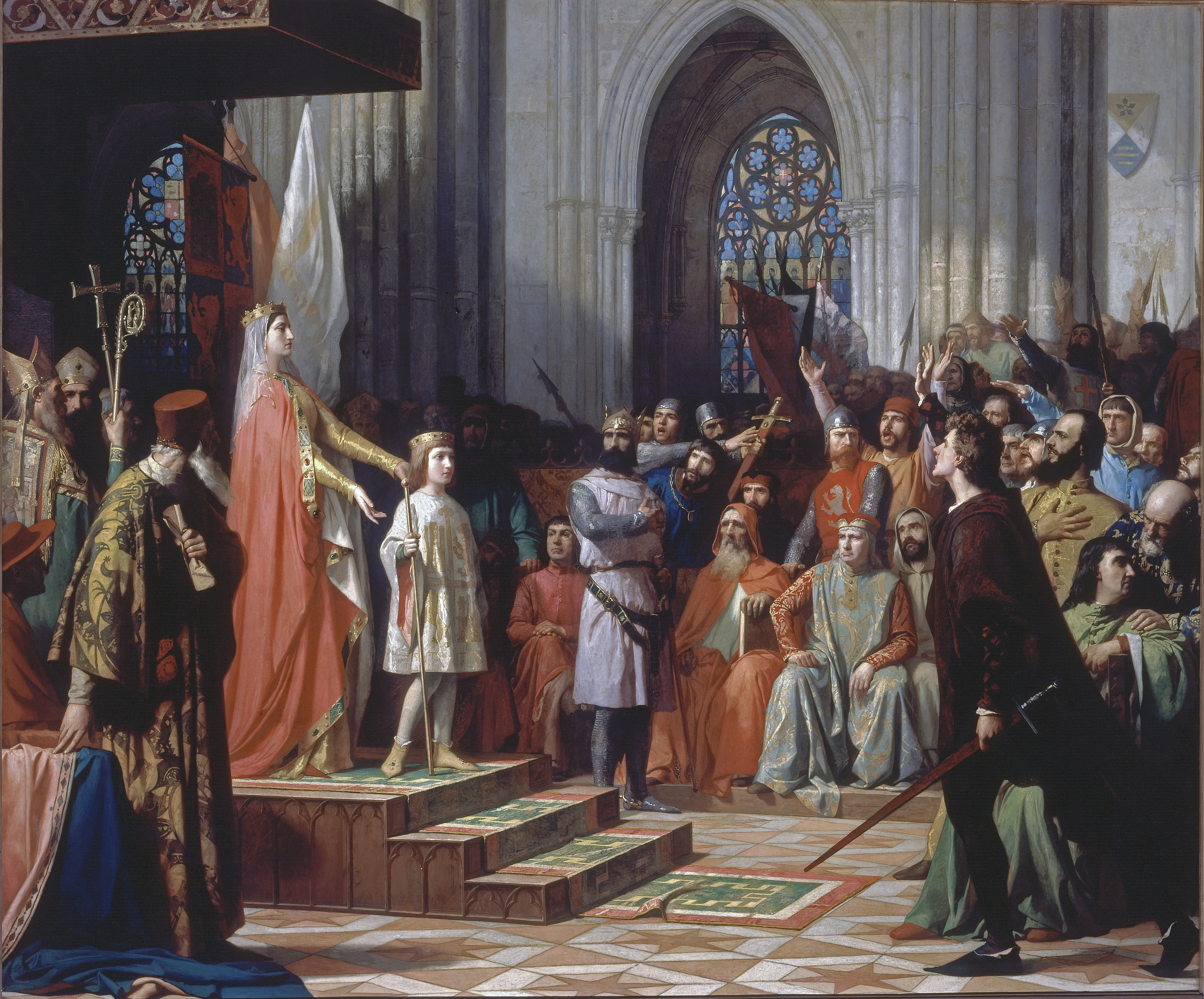
Maria de Molina presents her son Ferdinand IV at the Cortes of Valladolid in 1295. Oil on canvas by Antonio Gisbert, 1863. (Congress of Deputies of Spain).

- Juan Fernández de Villamayor (1295–1297/1301)
- Juan Rodríguez de Rojas (1298–1302). He was the greater merino of Castile in 1293. Although Juan Fernández de Villamayor appears in contemporary documents holding the post of greater adelantado of Castile between 1295 and 1301, when handing over the towns of Pedrajas and Poza de la Sal to Juan Rodríguez de Rojas in January 1298, Ferdinand IV mentions Rodríguez as the greater adelantado instead. In the ordinance of the 1301 Cortes of Burgos, Rodríguez also appears as the greater adelantado, as well as in that of the 1302 Cortes of Burgos. (Note: The document which recorded the donation, in January 1298, of the towns of Poza de la Sal and Pedrajas to Juan Rodríguez de Rojas and his wife, Urraca Ibáñez de Guevara, was published in full by Antonio Benavides Fernández de Navarrete in volume II of his Memoirs of Don Fernando IV of Castile. See Benavides (1860), pp. 155–156.) He was the son of Ruy Díaz de Rojas and María López de Sánsoles, and was the greater adelantado and merino of Castile, chief bailiff of the king and chief justice of the royal household.
- Garcí Fernández de Villamayor (1302–1304). He was a Castilian ricohombre, and during the minority of Alfonso XI he was one of the most prominent supporters of Infante Juan of Castile, Lord of Valencia, son of Alfonso X.
- Sancho Sánchez de Velasco (1305–1307, 1309–1311). He was the son of Fernán Sánchez de Velasco and Teresa Martínez, and Ferdinand IV gave him the valleys of Ruega and Soba together with two thousand vassals in the town of Arlanzón. He was the greater adelantado of Castile, chief justice of the royal household and greater adelantado of Andalusia. He married Sancha Carrillo, the daughter of Garcí Gómez Carrillo, chief mayor of the nobles of Castile, and Elvira Osorio.
- Fernán Ruiz de Saldaña (1308–1309, 1311), a Castilian ricohombre. Due to the support of Infante Henry of Castile the Senator, son of Ferdinand III and tutor of Ferdinand IV during his minority, and of Lord of Biscay Diego López V de Haro, he managed to get Ferdinand IV to give him the Palencian town of Saldaña around 1298 or 1299. Later, he was one of the most prominent allies of Infante Juan of Castile, Lord of Valencia throughout Ferdinand IV's reign. At the end of 1311, although other authors erroneously claim that it was in 1312, he again occupied the post of adelantado. Braulio Vázquez Campos suggested that perhaps as compensation, his predecessor Sánchez, one of Ferdinand IV's closest advisors, was named greater adelantado of Andalusia.

=== Reign of Alfonso XI (1312–1350) ===
- Fernán Ruiz de Saldaña (1312–1313)
- Pedro González de Sandoval (1314)
- Garci Lasso de la Vega I (1315–1326)
- Juan Martínez de Leyva (1326–1331, 1334–1335)
- Unknown (1336–1349)
- Fernán Pérez Portocarrero (1350).

=== Reign of Pedro I (1350–1366, 1367–1369) ===
- Fernán Pérez Portocarrero (1350)
- Garci Lasso de la Vega II (1350–1351)
- Juan García Manrique (1351–1352)
- Garci Fernández Manrique de Lara II (1352–1353)
- Fernán Pérez Portocarrero (1353)
- Garci Fernández Manrique de Lara II (1354 and 1355). He again held office from 1354 until November and then from April 1355.
- Pedro Ruiz de Villegas II (1354–1355). He was appointed in November 1354 and served until his assassination in April 1355.
- Diego Pérez Sarmiento (1355–1360)
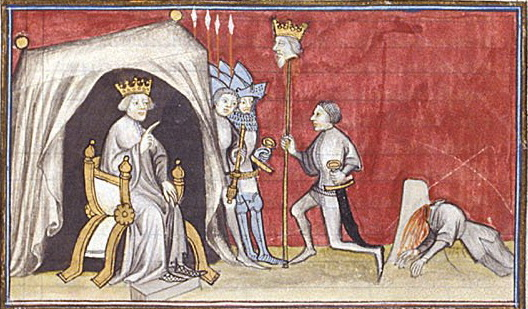
  Medieval miniature depicting the decapitation of King Peter of Castile after his defeat at the Battle of Montiel in 1369
- Fernando Sánchez de Tovar (1360–1361)
- Garci II Fernández Manrique de Lara (1362)
- Pedro Manrique (1363–1365)
- Pedro González de Mendoza (1365-1366)
- Álvar Rodríguez de Cueto (1366)
- Rodrigo Rodríguez de Torquemada (1367).

=== Reign of Enrique II (1366–1367, 1369–1379) ===
- Pedro Manrique (1366–1379).

=== Reign of Juan I (1379–1390) ===
- Pedro Manrique and Diego Gómez Sarmiento (1379–1380). According to historian Francisco de Paula Cañas Gálvez, between the years 1379 and 1380 the post was held by both of them.
- Diego Gómez Manrique (1380–1385)
- Gómez Manrique (1385–1411)
- Diego Gómez de Sandoval (1411–1449)
- Unknown (1450)
- Fernando de Rojas (1451)
- Juan Pacheco (1451–1456)
- Juan de Padilla (1456–1467)
- Diego de Sandoval (1467)
- Pedro López de Padilla (1468–1471).

== Bibliography ==
- Álvarez Borge, Ignacio (1993). Monarquía feudal y organización territorial: alfoces y merindades en Castilla, siglos X-XIV (in Spanish). Vol. 3. Madrid: Spanish National Research Council (CSIC).
- Arregui Zamorano, Pilar (2000). Monarquía y señoríos en la Castilla moderna. Los adelantamientos de Castilla, León y Campos. (in Spanish). Valladolid: Junta of Castile and León.
- Benavides, Antonio (1860). Memorias de Don Fernando IV de Castilla. Volume II (1st edition). (in Spanish). Madrid: Printing House of Don José Rodríguez. OCLC 253723961.
- Cañas Gálvez, Francisco de Paula (2011). "La Casa de Juan I de Castilla: aspectos domésticos y ámbitos privados de la realeza castellana a finales del siglo XIV (ca. 1370-1390)". La España medieval (in Spanish). 34. Complutense University of Madrid: Publications Service and Department of Medieval History: 133–180. ISSN 0214-3038.
- Ceballos-Escalera y Gila, Alfonso (1993). La orden y divisa de la Banda Real de Castilla (in Spanish). Ibero-American Press and Editions.
- Díaz Martín, Luis Vicente (1987). Los oficiales de Pedro I de Castilla (in Spanish) (2nd ed.). Valladolid: Secretariat of Publications of the University of Valladolid.
- González Mínguez, César (2000). "La señoralización de Álava: el ejemplo de Berantevilla". In Espacio, tiempo y forma. Serie III, Historia medieval (13): 103–118. (in Spanish). (Madrid: National University of Distance Education: Faculty of Geography and History). ISSN 0214-9745. Retrieved December 18, 2014.
- Calderón Medina, Inés (2018). Los Soverosa: Una parentela nobiliaria entre tres reinos. Poder y parentesco en la Edad Media Hispana (in Spanish). Valladolid: Ediciones Universidad de Valladolid. p. 167. ISBN 978-84-8448-967-2.
- Jular Pérez-Alfaro, Cristina (1990). Los adelantados y merinos mayores de León (siglos XIII-XV). Library of Castilla y León: No. 12 of the History Series (1st edition). (in Spanish). León: Gráficas Celarayn S.A. ISBN 84-7719-225-1.
- —— (1996). "Dominios señoriales y relaciones clienterales en Castilla: Velasco, Porres y Cárcamo (Siglos XII-XIV)". In Hispania: revista española de historia (192): 137–171. (in Spanish). (Madrid: CSIC: Institute of History and Publications Service). ISSN 0018-2141. Retrieved December 30, 2014.
- Lamingueiro Fernández, Xosé L. (2006). "Ascendencia e familia próxima de García Rodríguez de Valcarce o das Pontes" (PDF). Cátedra: Revista eumesa de estudios (in Galician). 13. Pontedeume: Concello de Pontedeume: 127–157. ISSN 1133-9608. Archived from the original (PDF) on March 5, 2016.
- Orella Unzué, José Luis (1984). "Los orígenes de la Hermandad de Guipúzcoa (las relaciones Guipúzcoa-Navarra en los siglos XIII-XIV" (PDF). Cuadernos de Sección. Historia-Geografía (in Spanish). San Sebastián: Society of Basque Studies: 25–100. ISSN 0212-6397. Archived from the original (PDF) on December 27, 2013.
- —— (1985). "Orígenes históricos y raíces sociales de la merindad mayor de Castilla La Vieja". In Azpilcueta: cuadernos de derecho (2): 7–54. (San Sebastián: Society of Basque Studies, Eusko Ikaskuntza) ISSN 1138-8552. Archived from the original on September 24, 2015. Retrieved July 26, 2014.
- Pardo de Guevara y Valdés, Eduardo (2000). Los señores de Galicia: tenentes y condes de Lemos en la Edad Media. Vol. 1. (1st edition). Prepared by the "Father Sarmiento" Institute of Galician Studies (CSIC). Pedro Barrié de la Maza Foundation. ISBN 84-89748-72-1.
- —— (2005). "De las viejas estirpes a las nuevas hidalguías. El entramado nobiliario gallego al fin de la Edad Media". In Nalgures (3): 263–278. (in Spanish). (La Coruña: Cultural Association of Historical Studies of Galicia). ISSN 1885-6349. Retrieved November 1, 2014.
- Picallo Fuentes, Héctor (2003). "Maíndo (A Estrada-Pontevedra): espacio xeográfico, humano e histórico na ascendencia do Condado de Ximonde (II)". In A Estrada: Miscelánea histórica e cultural (6): 163–232. (in Galician). (La Estrada: Manuel Reimóndez Portela Museum). ISSN 1139-921X. Retrieved December 25, 2014.
- Salazar y Acha, Jaime de (2000). Bartolomé Clavero Salvador (ed.). La casa del Rey de Castilla y León en la Edad Media. History of Political Society Collection (in Spanish) (1st ed.). Madrid: Rumagraf S.A. ISBN 978-84-259-1128-6.
- —— (2021). Las dinastías reales de España en la Edad Media (1st edition). (in Spanish). Madrid: National Printing Office of the State Agency Official Gazette of the State. ISBN 978-84-340-2781-7.
- Vázquez Campos, Braulio (2006). Los adelantados mayores de la frontera o Andalucía (Siglos XIII-XIV) (in Spanish). Camas: Provincial Council of Seville. ISBN 84-7798-230-9.
- Various authors (1999). El señorío de los cameros: introducción histórica e inventario analítico de su archivo (1st edition). (in Spanish). Logroño: Institute of Riojan Studies and Government of La Rioja. ISBN 978-84-89362-66-6.
