= Garci =

Garci (pronounced [ˈɡaɾθi]) may refer to:

== Given name ==
In chronological order

- Garci López de Padilla, Spanish noble, Grand Master of the military Order of Calatrava from 1296 to 1322, commander of the Castilian forces at the Siege of Gibraltar in 1309
- Garcí Méndez II de Sotomayor (1280–?), Spanish noble
- Garci Lasso de la Vega I (died 1328), Spanish noble
- Garci Lasso de la Vega II (died 1351), Spanish soldier
- Garci Lasso Ruiz de la Vega (1340–1367), Spanish noble
- Garci Álvarez de Toledo, Spanish noble, Grand Master of the religious and military Order of Santiago from 1359 to 1366
- Garci Rodríguez de Montalvo (c. 1450–1505), Castilian author
- Garci Sánchez de Badajoz (1460?–1526?), Spanish writer and poet
- Garcí Manuel de Carbajal (died 1552), Spanish lieutenant and soldier who founded the city of Arequipa (in what is now Peru)

== Surname ==
- Gwen Garci, Filipina actress and model
- José Luis Garci, Spanish filmmaker

== See also ==
- Virgilio Garcillano, Filipino politician
- Hello Garci scandal, Filipino political scandal
- Salinas de Garci Mendoza, a town in Bolivia
- Tony Garcy (born 1939), American weightlifter
