= Pedro Ruiz de Villegas II =

Coat of Arms of the Villegas noble family

Pedro Ruiz de Villegas y Cevallos II (b. Burgos, c. 1304 – Medina del Campo, 1355) was a Spanish noble baron in the service of the Kingdom of Castile and a member of the Order of Santiago. He was the head of the House of Villegas and a descendant of the houses of Cevallos and of Lucio. As the majorat of his own heraldic crest, he received titles over Villegas, Manquillos, Castillo Pedroso, Moñux, Pedrosa del Páramo, Manciles, Valdegómez and the palace of Sasamón. For his service in the First Castilian Civil War, and his role in the destruction of the Blanche of Bourbon league he received the castle of Caracena, and was named high adelantado of Castile in 1354. A year later, Peter of Castile would execute him in the village of Medina del Campo.

== Family Origins ==
Pedro Ruiz de Villegas II was born in the city of Burgos in 1304. He was the son of Ruy Pérez de Villegas I and Teresa González de Cevallos, son in law of Garci Lasso de la Vega I. His full name was Pedro Ruiz de Villegas Lucio y de Cevallos, IV Señor de la Casa de Villegas y de diversas baronías. His father, Ruy Pérez de Villegas I and Teresa González Cevallos had four children:

Order of Santiago.

- Pedro Ruiz de Villegas II
- Sancho Ruiz de Villegas «El Segundón» who married María Alfonso.
- Lope Ruiz de Villegas, father of Alfonso López de Villegas.
- María Ruiz de Villegas who married Lope Díaz Alcalde.

== Life ==
=== Knight of the Band and Marriage ===
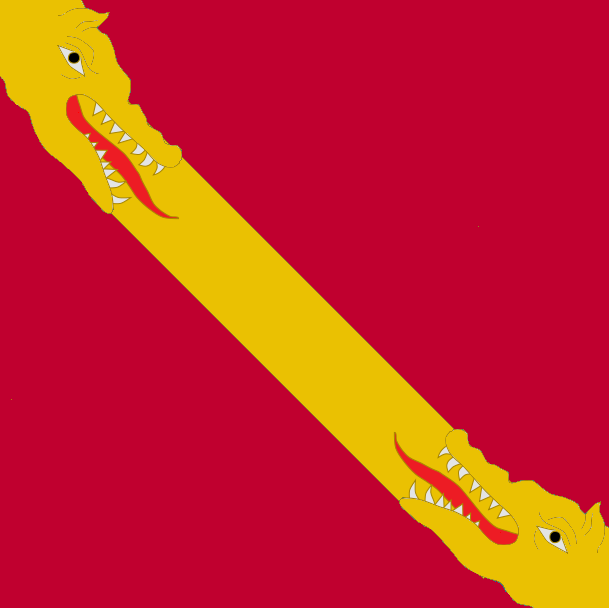
Rendition of the Knights of the Band Symbol.

In 1332, the King Alfonso XI of Castile founded the Order of the Band with the intent of consolidating his power over the unruly nobility of Castile. He ordered that certain nobles were to dress like him with white cloths and a crimson taffeta band that he had designed himself. The members were made to follow a rigid etiquette behavior, to participate in jousts, to be very solitary and to remain, above all, loyal to the King. It was thus that Pedro Ruiz de Villegas II was named a Knight of the Order of the Band along with his younger brother Lope Ruiz de Villegas.

In 1348 he married Teresa González de la Vega (n. c. 1328), daughter of Garci Lasso de la Vega I who was a noble from Cantabria. On March 19, 1351, Pedro and Teresa sold most of their properties to their paternal uncle, Garci Lasso de la Vega II.

In early 1350, Tello de Castilla, son of Alfonso XI and Leonor de Guzmán, inherited various properties from his father on his 13th birthday. Tello appointed Villegas as the chief administrator of all his properties, a move that would cost Villegas dearly when some of these properties were lost in the subsequent Castilian Civil War.

=== First Castilian Civil War ===
==== Coronation of Peter of Castile ====
Alfonso XI of Castile died on 26 March, 1350. Upon his death, Prince Pedro assumed the throne at a mere 16 years of age. Peter abandoned his father's agenda of Reconquista and pursued a policy of cutting the powers of the Spanish nobles and concentrating power in the crown of Castile and the bourgeoisie. Peter also took other unpopular steps such as the protection of the minority Jewish community. When the nobles rebelled in defense of their privileges, the King responded with severity and executed various nobles, including the father of Pedro Ruiz de Villegas II.

To inflame matters, later in 1351, the Queen Dowager María de Portugal, ordered the assassination of the former lover of King Alfonso XI, Leonor de Guzmán who had been held prisoner in Talavera de la Reina. She had previously given birth to the twins Fadrique Alfonso de Castilla and Enrique II de Castilla, the latter of which had secretly married Juana Manuel de Villena y Núñez de Lara in July 1350. This murder further enraged the aristocracy and ignited the Castilian Civil War.

As Pedro Ruiz de Villegas II was in the service of Tello de Castilla, who had joined the rebellion against the King, he was likewise branded an enemy of the crown.

==== Assassination ====
In 1355. Peter of Castile consolidated himself in Segovia and later in Burgos where he oversaw the suppression of the remaining rebels. In April of the same year, by mandate of the King, Pedro Ruiz de Villegas II was assassinated while he slept along with his squire in the village of Medina del Campo.

== Bibliography ==
- C.P. Francisco de Quevedo - Pueblos de Santiurde de Tornazo (Cantabria) - Señoríos de Villasevil y Acereda de la Casa Mayor de Villegas y de la posterior segundona Casa Ruiz de Villegas
- Pueblos de Palencia - Manquillos - Solariego de Nuño Pérez de Lara, Pedro Ruiz de Villegas y sucesores
- Breve aproximación de la vida de Don Tello (por José Ma. Domínguez del Hoyo
- Castillo de Caracena, señorío de Pedro Ruiz de Villegas y su hijo Ruy Pérez de Villegas hasta 1366
- Pueblos de Soria - Moñux - Señorío de Pedro Ruiz de Villegas II
- Caballeros de la Orden Real de la Banda - Pedro Ruiz de Villegas II, Adelantado Mayor de Castilla
- Pueblos de Corvera de Toranzo (Cantabria) - Señorío de Castillo Pedroso - Segundona Casa Ruiz de Villegas - Sancho Ruiz de Villegas y Terán
