= Garcilaso de la Vega =

Garcilaso de la Vega (or Garci Lasso de la Vega) may refer to:

- Garci Lasso de la Vega I (d. 1326), Castilian noble
- Garci Lasso de la Vega II (d. 1351), Castilian noble, son of Garci Lasso de la Vega I
- Garcilaso de la Vega (poet) (c. 1501–1536), Spanish poet and soldier
- Sebastián Garcilaso de la Vega y Vargas (1507–1559), Spanish conquistador, father of Inca Garcilaso de la Vega
- Inca Garcilaso de la Vega (1539–1616), Peruvian chronicler

== See also ==
- Estadio Garcilaso, primary football stadium of Cuzco, Peru, named for Garcilaso de la Vega (chronicler)
