= Leonor Lasso de la Vega =

Spanish noble

Coat of Arms of the House of Lasso de la Vega.

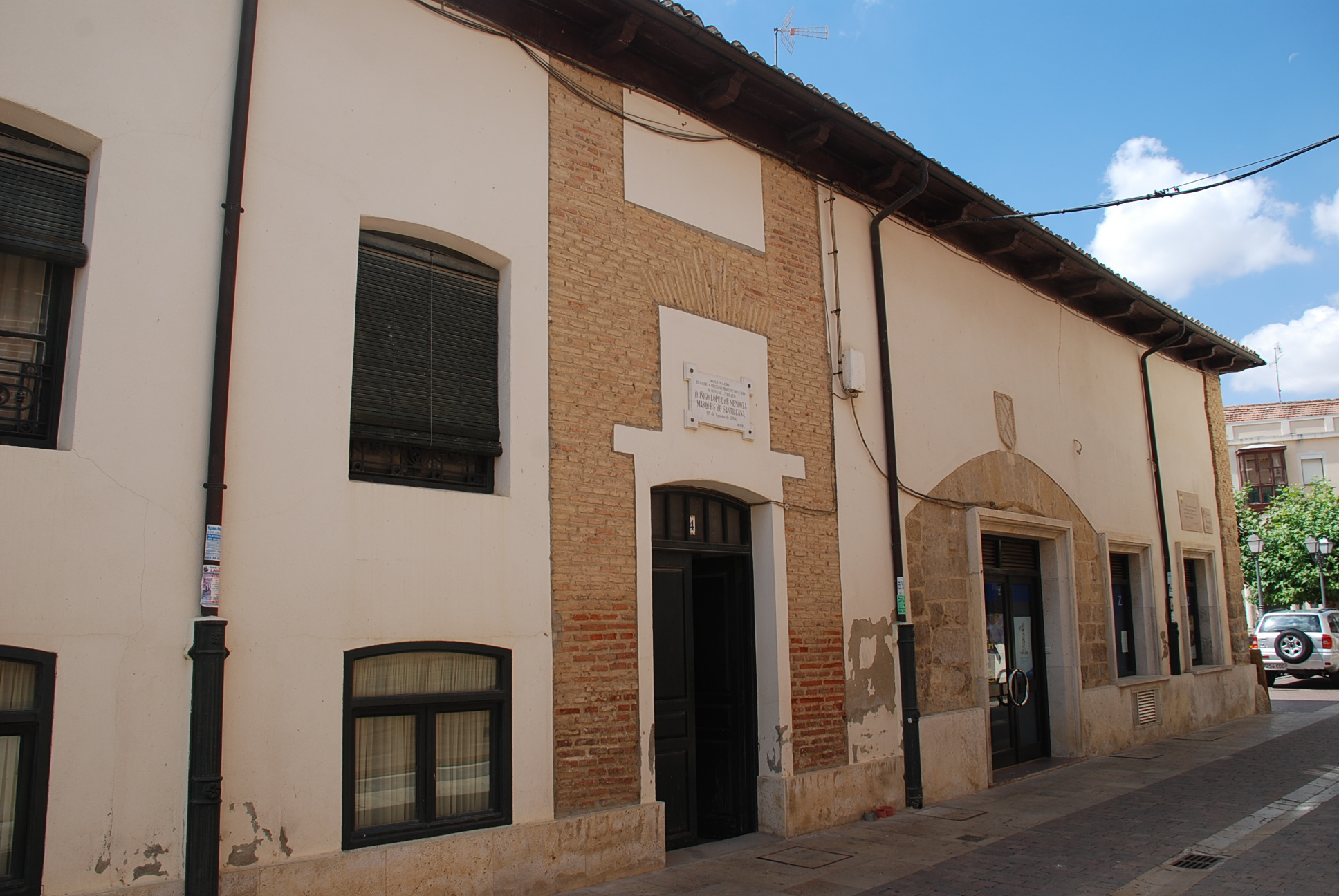
The house where Leonor gave birth to Íñigo López de Mendoza, in Carrión de los Condes (Palencia).

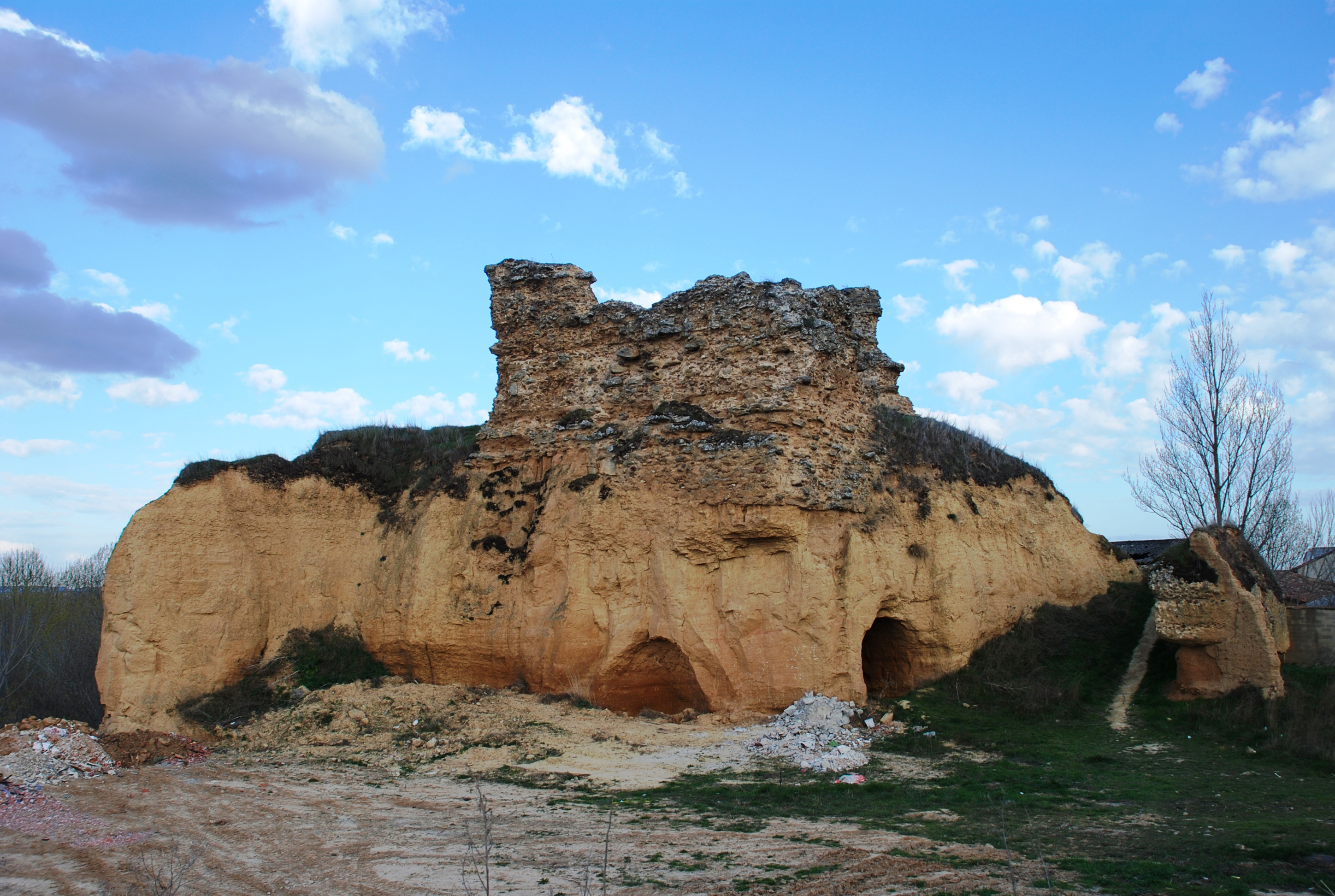
Castle of Castrillo de Villavega, which belonged to the family of Leonor.

Leonor Lasso de la Vega (b. before 1367 – d. 1432) was a Spanish noblewoman from Cantabria and head of the prestigious House of Lasso de la Vega from 1367 to 1432.

== Family origins ==
Leonor was the paternal great-granddaughter of Garci Lasso de la Vega I, the chancellor of the Kingdom of Castile, who was executed in 1326 by order of King Alfonso XI of Castile.

She was the paternal granddaughter of Garci Lasso de la Vega II, assassinated by Peter of Castile in 1351, who was the highest royal official to the court of Fadrique Alfonso de Castilla, son of King Alfonso XI of Castile.

She was the only daughter of Garci Lasso Ruiz de la Vega, who spent his life in the service of Henry II of Castile and was killed at the Battle of Nájera in 1367 whereupon Leonor rose to the position of head of the house.

== Biography ==
She was a lifelong benefactor of the Monasterio de Santa Clara de Castrojeríz which was founded by her grandparents, Garci Lasso de la Vega II and Leonor González de Cornado.

== Marriage, descendants and legacy ==
Leonor's first marriage was with Juan Téllez de Castilla, the second lord of Aguilar de Campoo and the second lord of Castañeda. He was the son of Tello de Castilla who was, in turn, the illegitimate son of Alfonso XI of Castile and Eleanor de Guzmán. The couple had one child:

- Aldonza Téllez de Castilla y de la Vega (b. 1382 – d. 1449), who married Garci IV Fernández Manrique de Lara. The couple went on to become the first Counts of Castañeda. Their offspring went on to found the Marquesado de Aguilar de Campoo, the Ducado de Galisteo and the Condado de Osorno.

When Tello died on 14 August 1385 at the Battle of Aljubarrota, Leonor remarried in 1387 with Diego Hurtado de Mendoza, High Admiral of Castile, bringing with her dowry, the title over the town of Carrión de los Condes and a manor at Asturias de Santillana. The two had the following children:

- García Lasso de la Vega, who according to his father's testamentary clauses had to change his name to Juan Hurtado de Mendoza.
- Elvira Laso de Mendoza, married Gómez I Suárez de Figueroa. Their son was Lorenzo II Suárez de Figueroa, first Count of Feria.
- Íñigo López de Mendoza, 1st Marquis of Santillana, founder of the powerful Dukedom of the Infantado and 1st Marquis of Santillana.
- Gonzalo Ruiz de Mendoza, whose grandmother, Mencía de Cisneros in her last will and testament of 1380 left him titles over Tierra de Campos and Vega with all its land and vassals.
- Teresa de la Vega y Mendoza, married Álvaro Carrillo de Albornoz.

In August 1432, Leonor empowered her children Íñigo, Gonzalo y Elvira to draft her last will and testament, by which process, her daughter from her first marriage, Aldonza was disinherited.

After her death, all her domains went to the House of Mendoza through Íñigo López de Mendoza. In 1445 King, John II of Castile confirmed this action by granting the title of Marquis of Santillana, where after Santillana del Mar which became the center of the lordship of Torrelavega in Cantabria.

The Cantabrian surname "Lasso de la Vega" was passed on through this maternal line at later times throughout the years and is associated with various soldiers, poets, and golden age writers such as Garcilaso de la Vega, the soldier and poet, and Inca Garcilaso, the historian from the Viceroyalty of Peru.

Preceded by Garci Lasso Ruiz de la Vega	Head of the House of Lasso de la Vega; 1367–1432	Succeeded by Íñigo López de Mendoza

== Bibliography ==
- Helen Nader, The Mendoza Family in the Spanish Renaissance (1350-1550)
