= Fernán Pérez de Guzmán =

15th-century Spanish historian and poet

Fernán (or Fernando) Pérez de Guzmán (1376–1458) was a Spanish historian and poet. He belonged to a family distinguished both for its patrician standing and its literary connections, for his uncle was Pero López de Ayala, Grand Chancellor of Castile, historian and poet, and a kinsman was the Marquis of Santillana, one of the most important authors of the time of Juan II of Castile. Part of his verse, such as the "Proverbios" and the "Diversas virtudes", is purely moral and didactic. The more important part is represented by the panegyrical Loores de los claros varones de España, which in 409 octaves gives a full account of the leading figures in Spanish history from Roman times down to that of Benedict XIII. The most notable of his prose historical compositions is the Generaciones é Semblanzas, a collection of biographies which constitutes the third part of a large compilation, La mar de historias. The first two parts of this work, perhaps suggested by the Mare historiarum of Johannes de Columna, are devoted to a perfunctory account of the reigns of the sovereigns of pre-Arabic times. The third part, the "Generaciones", contains thirty-six portraits of contemporary personages, especially of members of the courts of Henry III of Castile and Juan II, and furnishes an example of character painting in Spanish literature.

Some have attributed to him a book called the "Cronica de Juan II". His prose works may be found in the Biblioteca de autores españoles LXVIII; a separate edition of the "Generaciones" appeared at Madrid in 1775. His verse is given in the Cancionero de Baena, and in the "Cancionero general".
