= Diego Hurtado de Mendoza (Admiral of Castile) =

Coat of arms of the House of Mendoza.

Diego Hurtado de Mendoza (1367 – June 1404) was the Admiral of Castile, 1st Lord Canete, and tenth head of the House of Mendoza. He was the son of Pedro González de Mendoza I and Aldonza López de Ayala. He was married to Leonor Lasso de la Vega, head of the powerful House of Lasso de la Vega.

== Biography ==
Diego was born in the city of Guadalajara. In the spring of 1379, while only a child, his father successfully convinced King Henry II of Castile shortly before Henry's death that Diego was to be married to Henry's illegitimate daughter, María. A lavish wedding was soon held.

His father died in the Battle of Aljubarrota (August 14, 1385), though he saved the life of King John I of Castile which substantially aided the family's standing. Diego's ascendancy was quick. King John granted him the title of Admiral of Castile and Mayordomo mayor del Rey. Shortly afterward, in the reign of King Henry III, Diego fought against the Portuguese fleet for possession of the Strait of Gibraltar as part of his duties as admiral. In reward for this and other expressions of loyalty, King Henry made multiple donations and grants to him, and gave Diego rule over the town of Tendilla in 1395.

His first wife María died in childbirth, though their daughter Aldonza de Mendoza, the future Countess of Arjona, lived. Diego married again in 1394 and chose Leonor Lasso de la Vega, a descendant of the rich and powerful counts of la Vega. Born in August 1398, their son Íñigo López de Mendoza would become the first Marquis of Santillana.

The Admiral made a will in El Espinar (Segovia) in April 1400, before a new campaign against the Portuguese began. After returning safely, he added a codicil dated May 5 of 1404 in Guadalajara. He died shortly afterward in Guadalajara, the city of his birth. His widow had to plead for her son's rights to her stepdaughter doña Aldonza, and before that to Alfonso Enriquez, to whom Henry III had given the title of Admiral of Castile.
