= Juan Pérez de Guzmán =

- Lord
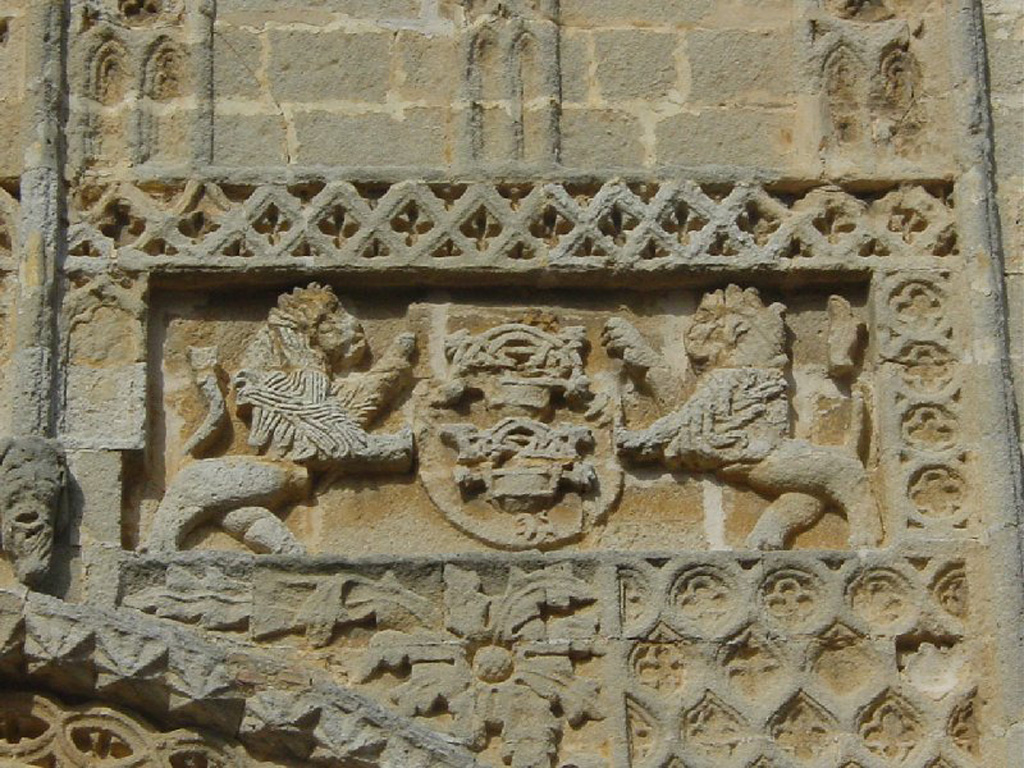
- Coat of arms of the Pérez de Guzmán family, present in the Parish Nuestra Señora de la O
- Full name: Juan Pérez de Guzmán y García de Villamayor
- Born: 13th-century Sanlúcar, Spain
- Died: 13th-century Sanlúcar, Spain
- Noble family: House of Guzmán
- Spouse: Maria Ramírez de Cifuentes

Juan Pérez de Guzmán (1240–1285) was a Spanish nobleman, Lord of Guzmán, and Gumiel de Mercado.

== Biography ==
Juan was the son of Pedro Núñez de Guzmán and Urraca Garcia de Villamayor, a distinguished family, belonging to the Spanish nobility. His wife was María Ramírez, daughter of Ramiro Frolaz de Cifuentes, a nobleman descendant of Ramiro Fróilaz, and Teresa Núñez de Lara.
