= Lasso de la Vega =

Coat of arms of the House of Lasso de la Vega (against a gold field with "Ave Maria Gratia Plena" written in blue) combined with the Arms of the House of Mendoza.

The House de la Vega, Laso de la Vega or Lasso de la Vega (sometimes even Garci Lasso de la Vega or Garcilaso de la Vega depending on the family member referenced) is a Spanish noble line from the Kingdom of Castile. The family origins lie in the areas now known as Torrelavega which was established in the Middle Ages. The House of de la Vega was one of the most important families in the territory, which now makes up Cantabria, and they dominated a large amount of the terrain and property between the Torre de la Vega and the Castillo de Argüeso.

This noble house merged with the House of Mendoza, which subsequently adopted its motto "Ave Maria, Gratia Plena", after the marriage of Leonor Lasso de la Vega, the daughter and only heir of Garci Lasso Ruiz de la Vega, and Diego Hurtado de Mendoza, the Head Admiral of Castile. From this marriage was born Íñigo López de Mendoza, the first Marquess of Santillana. After this union, the Lordship of the House of de la Vega was passed on as property of his successors, the Dukes of the Infantado.

The family reached the height of its power in the 15th century when facing off against the monarchy. They were able to set up a system of Mayordomazgos independent of the crown and based in the Castillo de Pedraja, which belonged to the family. During this time, there were a great many power struggles going on in the area of Cantabria, creating a number of social conflicts.

After the merger with the House of Mendoza, the Cantabrian surname "Lasso de la Vega" was passed on through the maternal line at later times throughout the years and is associated with various soldiers, poets, and Golden Age writers such as Garcilaso de la Vega, the soldier and poet, and Inca Garcilaso, the historian from the Viceroyalty of Peru.

== Head of House ==
Head of House	Period
--
?	
Garci Laso de la Vega I	–1326
Garci Laso de la Vega II	–1351
Garci Lasso Ruiz de la Vega	1351–1367
Leonor Lasso de la Vega	1367–1432
Íñigo López de Mendoza	1432–1458
Diego Hurtado de Mendoza	1458-Dukes of the Infantado

== Bibliography ==
- VVAA; Diccionario histórico, genealógico y heráldico de las familias ilustres de la monarquía española (1860).
