= María de Padilla =

Mistress of Peter of Castile (c. 1334–1361)

María Díaz de Padilla
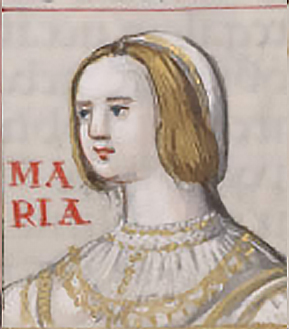
- Image of Maria de Padilla from 15th century manuscript
- Born: 1334; Burgos, Spain
- Died: July 1361 (aged 26–27); Seville, Spain
- Buried: Sevilla, Spain
- Noble family: Padilla
- Spouse: Peter of Castile
- Issue: Beatrice, Infanta of Castile; Constance, Duchess of Lancaster; Isabella, Duchess of York; Alfonso, Infante of Castile
- Father: Juan García de Padilla, 1st Lord of Villagera
- Mother: María de Henestrosa

Arms of Maria de Padilla

María Díaz de Padilla (c. 1334 (Note: Her place of birth is not documented. The places suggested by various authors are Seville, Vallejera, Cordovilla, or Astudillo, the last two in Palencia.) –Seville, July 1361) was the mistress of King Peter of Castile, whom he posthumously recognised as his wife.

== Family ==
She was a Castilian noblewoman, daughter of Juan García de Padilla (died between 1348 and 1351) and his wife María de Henestrosa (Note: In the Chronica de las tres Ordenes y Cauallerias de Sanctiago, Calatraua y Alcantara (1572) she is called "Maria Gomez de Hinestrosa", and is similarly named in Cister militante en la campaña de la Iglesia contra la Sarracena (1662). However, as early as 1729 with Descripcion historica, chronologica y genealogica, civil, politica y militar de la serenissima republica de Genova she begins to be referred to by historians as "Maria Gonzalez de Hinestrosa", by which name she is predominantly known in later historical literature. In addition to Henestrosa and Hinestrosa, her surname also appears as Ynestrosa.) (died after September 1356). Her maternal uncle was Juan Fernández de Henestrosa, the King's favorite between 1354 and 1359 after Juan Alfonso de Alburquerque fell out of favor, and the mediator in an apparent pardon for Fadrique Alfonso, King Peter's half-brother. She was also the sister of Diego García de Padilla, Grand Master of the Order of Calatrava. María's family, members of the regional nobility, originally came from the area of Padilla de Abajo, near Castrojeriz in the province of Burgos.

She is described in the chronicles of her time as very beautiful, intelligent, and small of body. (Note: …muy fermosa, e de buen entendimiento e pequeña de cuerpo.)

== Relationship with King Peter of Castile ==
King Peter met María in the summer of 1352 during an expedition to Asturias to battle his rebellious half-brother Henry. It was probably her maternal uncle, Juan Fernández de Henestrosa, who introduced them, as mentioned in the chronicle of King Peter's reign written by Pero López de Ayala. (Note: En este tiempo, yendo el rey a Gijón, tomo a doña María de Padilla que era una doncella muy fermosa e andaba en casa de doña Isabel de Meneses, muger de don Juan Alfonso de Alburquerque que la criaba, e tráxogela a Sant Fagund Juan Ferrandez de Henestrosa, su tío, hermano de doña María González, su madre.) At that time, María was being raised at the house of Isabel de Meneses, wife of Juan Alfonso de Alburquerque, a powerful nobleman. They became lovers and their relationship lasted until her death despite the King's other marriages and affairs. The Padillas were raised to various offices and dignities. Her uncle, Henestrosa, became Alcalde de los fidalgos.

In the summer of 1353, under coercion from family and the main court favorite, Juan Alfonso de Alburquerque, Peter wed Blanche of Bourbon, the first cousin of King John II of France. Peter abandoned Blanche within three days when he learned that she had an affair with his bastard brother Fadrique Alfonso en route to Spain, and that the dowry was not coming.

== Children ==
María and Peter had three daughters: Beatrice (1353–1369), Constance (1354–1394), and Isabella (1355–1392), and a son, Alfonso, crown-prince of Castile (1359 - October 19, 1362).

Two of their daughters were married to sons of Edward III, King of England. Isabella married Edmund of Langley, 1st Duke of York, while the elder, Constance, married John of Gaunt, 1st Duke of Lancaster, leading him to claim the crown of Castile on behalf of his wife. Constance's daughter, Catherine of Lancaster, married Henry III of Castile in order to reunify any claim to succession that may have passed via Constance.

== Death and burial ==
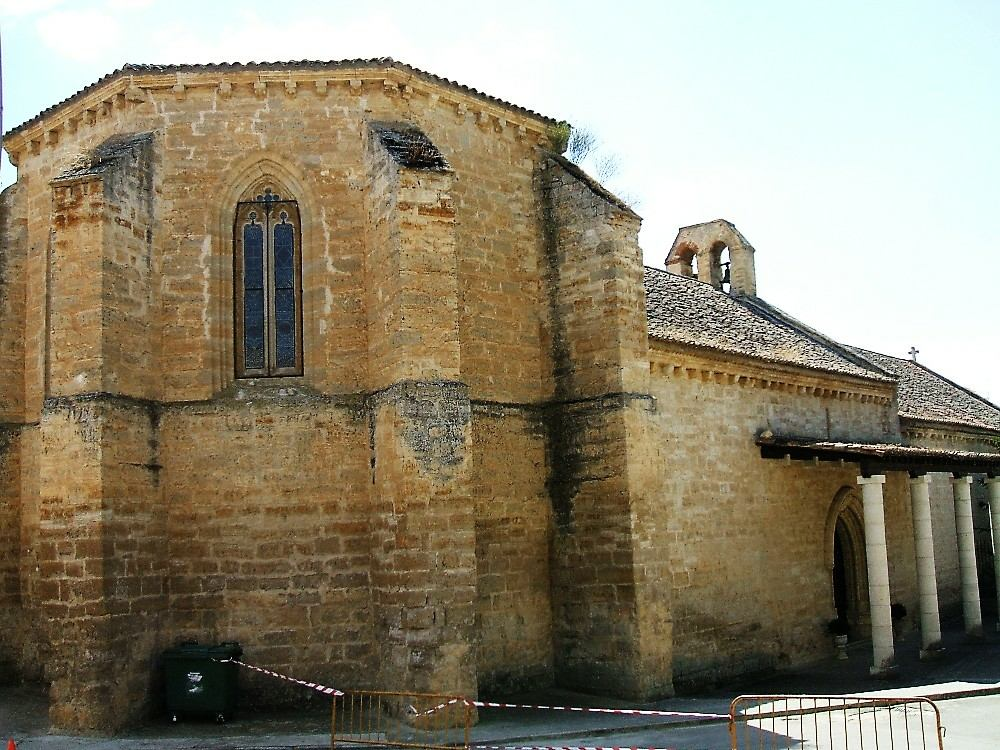
Real Monasterio de Santa Clara en Astudillo (Palencia) founded by María de Padilla

María de Padilla died in July 1361, possibly a victim of the plague, although Pero López de Ayala does not specify the cause in his chronicle of the King's reign.

She was buried in the Real Monasterio de Santa Clara de Astudillo which she had founded in 1354. Shortly afterwards, however, her remains were taken, following the orders of King Peter, to Seville Cathedral where she received burial in the Royal Chapel with other members of the royal family.

After her death, King Peter claimed to have married her in secret in 1353, and that she was his first and only legitimate wife.

== Depictions in fiction ==
- Gaetano Donizetti composed Maria Padilla (1841), an opera about her relationship with King Peter.
- Rudolf Gottschall wrote Maria de Padilla (18??), a drama about her life.
- Beverly Adam wrote Maria de Padilla, The Secret Queen of Castile, a romance about her life.

== Ancestry ==
Ancestors of María de Padilla

8. Lope García de Padilla
4. García López de Padilla
2. Juan García de Padilla
10. Gonzalo de Vera
5. Leonor González de Vera
11. Inés de Estenca
1. María de Padilla
12. Gonzalo Pérez de Henestrosa
6. Fernán González de Henestrosa
3. María de Henestrosa
14. Arias Díaz
7. María Arias
15. Aldonza Ramírez

== Bibliography ==
- Arco y Garay, Ricardo del (1954). Sepulcros de la Casa Real de Castilla (in Spanish). Madrid: Instituto Jerónimo Zurita. Consejo Superior de Investigaciones Científicas. OCLC 11366237.
- Estepa Díez, Carlos (2003). Las Behetrías Castellanas, Vol. I (in Spanish). Junta de Castilla y León, Consejería de Cultura y Turismo. ISBN 84-9718-117-4.
- Fernández-Ruiz, César (1965). "Ensayo histórico-biográfico sobre D. Pedro de Castilla y Dª María de Padilla. El Real Monasterio y el Palacio de Astudillo: recuerdo de un gran amor". Publicaciones de la Institución Tello Téllez de Meneses (in Spanish) (24). Institución Tello Téllez de Meneses: 17–62. ISSN 0210-7317.
- Vaca Lorenzo, Ángel (1983). "Documentación Medieval de la Villa de Astudillo (Palencia)". Publicaciones de la Institución Tello Téllez de Meneses (in Spanish) (48). Institución Tello Téllez de Meneses: 29–100. ISSN 0210-7317.
- Valdeón Baruque, Julio (2002). Pedro I el Cruel y Enrique de Trastámara (in Spanish). Santillana Ediciones Generales, S.L. ISBN 84-03-09331-4.
