= Garci Lasso Ruiz de la Vega =

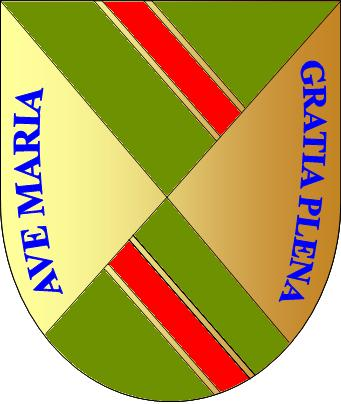
Coat of Arms of the House of Lasso de la Vega.

Garci Lasso Ruiz de la Vega (1340 – 2 April 1367) was a Spanish noble from Cantabria and one of the pillars in the history of the prominent contemporary House of Garci Lasso de la Vega or Garcilasco de la Vega. As the eldest son, Garci Lasso Ruiz de la Vega succeeded his father, Garci Lasso de la Vega II, as the head of his household.

== Family origins ==
Garci was the grandson of Garci Lasso de la Vega I, the chancellor of the Kingdom of Castile who was executed in 1326 by order of King Alfonso XI of Castile, and his wife Juana de Castañeda. He was the son of Garci Lasso de la Vega II who was the highest royal official to the court of Fadrique Alfonso de Castilla, son of King Alfonso XI of Castile, and his wife, Leonor González de Cornado. His father continued the trend of regal defiance and assassination and was killed in Burgos in 1351 by order of Peter of Castile.

== Biography ==
After the assassination of his father in 1351, Garci Lasso Ruiz de la Vega fled and took shelter with his mother at Asturias de Oviedo. They were here placed under the protection of Enrique de Trastámara the illegitimate son of Alfonso XI of Castile who would later rise to become King Henry II of Castile.

For this protection, Garci remained loyal to the crown of Castile under Henry II and went on to fight for him in the power struggle that ensued for the crown against the man who killed his father, Peter of Castile.

== Death ==
Garci Lasso Ruiz de la Vega died at the age of 27 in the Battle of Nájera (La Rioja on 2 April 1367. The battle went poorly for the side of Henry II who was forced to flee and did not manage to recapture the throne until after the Battle of Montiel in 1369 where after he personally executed his half brother, Peter of Castile and claimed the throne.

== Marriage, descendants and legacy ==
Garci married Mencía de Cisneros, fourth lady of Guardo and daughter of Juan Rodríguez de Cisneros and Mencía de Padilla. The couple had one girl:

- Leonor Lasso de la Vega (born before 1367 - died 1432, Valladolid)

The Cantabrian surname "Lasso de la Vega" was passed on through this maternal line at later times throughout the years and is associated with various soldiers, poets, and golden age writers such as Garcilaso de la Vega, the soldier and poet, and Inca Garcilaso, the historian from the Viceroyalty of Peru.

Preceded by Garci Lasso de la Vega II	Head of the House of Lasso de la Vega; 1351–1367	Succeeded by Leonor Lasso de la Vega
