= Íñigo López de Mendoza, 1st Marquis of Santillana =

Castilian politician

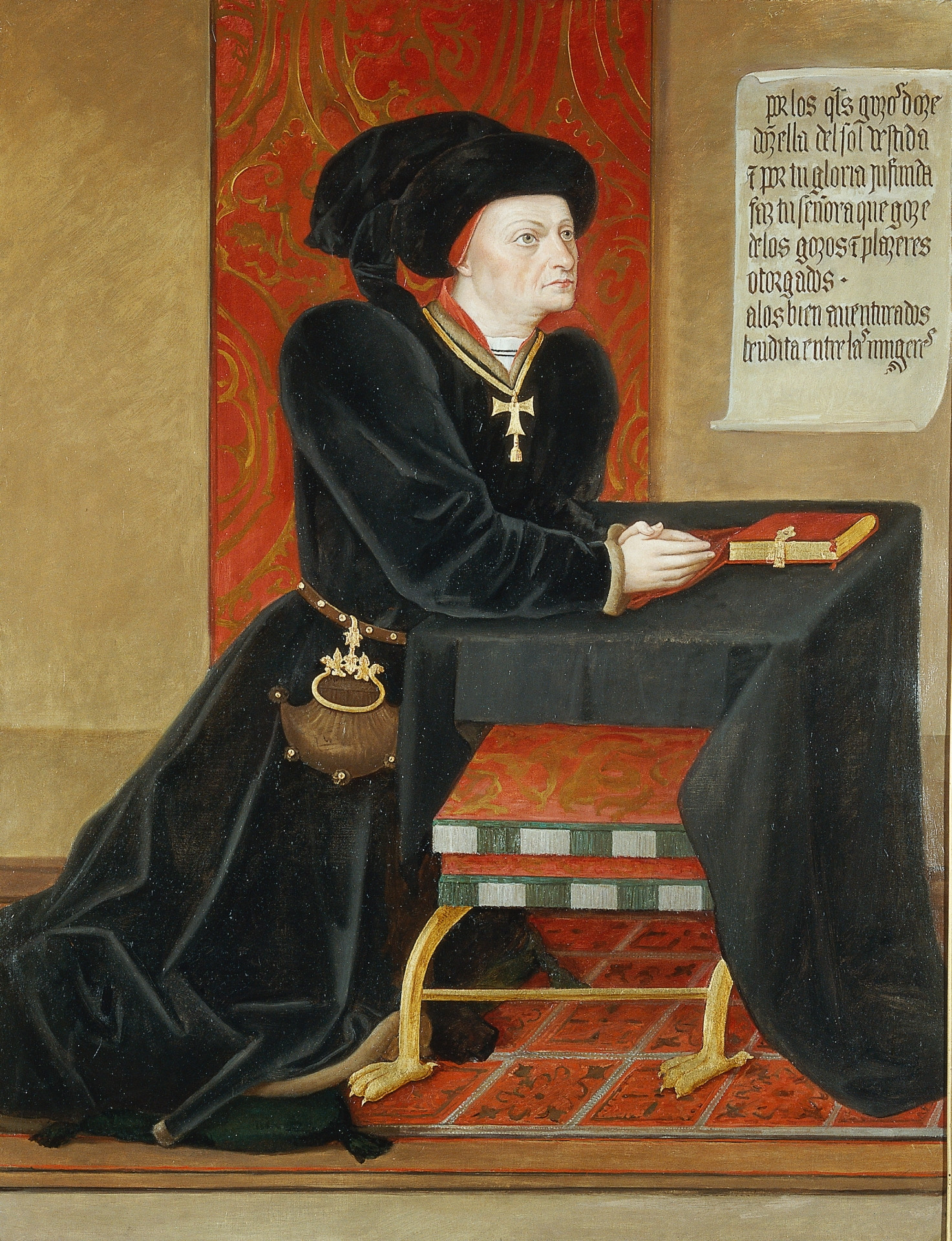
Jorge Ingles, A portrait of the donor Don Íñigo López de Mendoza, Marqués de Santillana from the Altarpiece of Buitrago, c. 1455

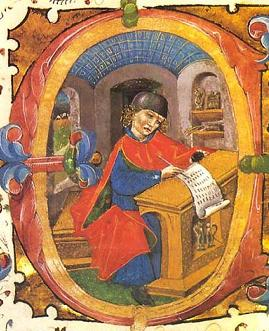
Possible portrait of the Marquess of Santillana

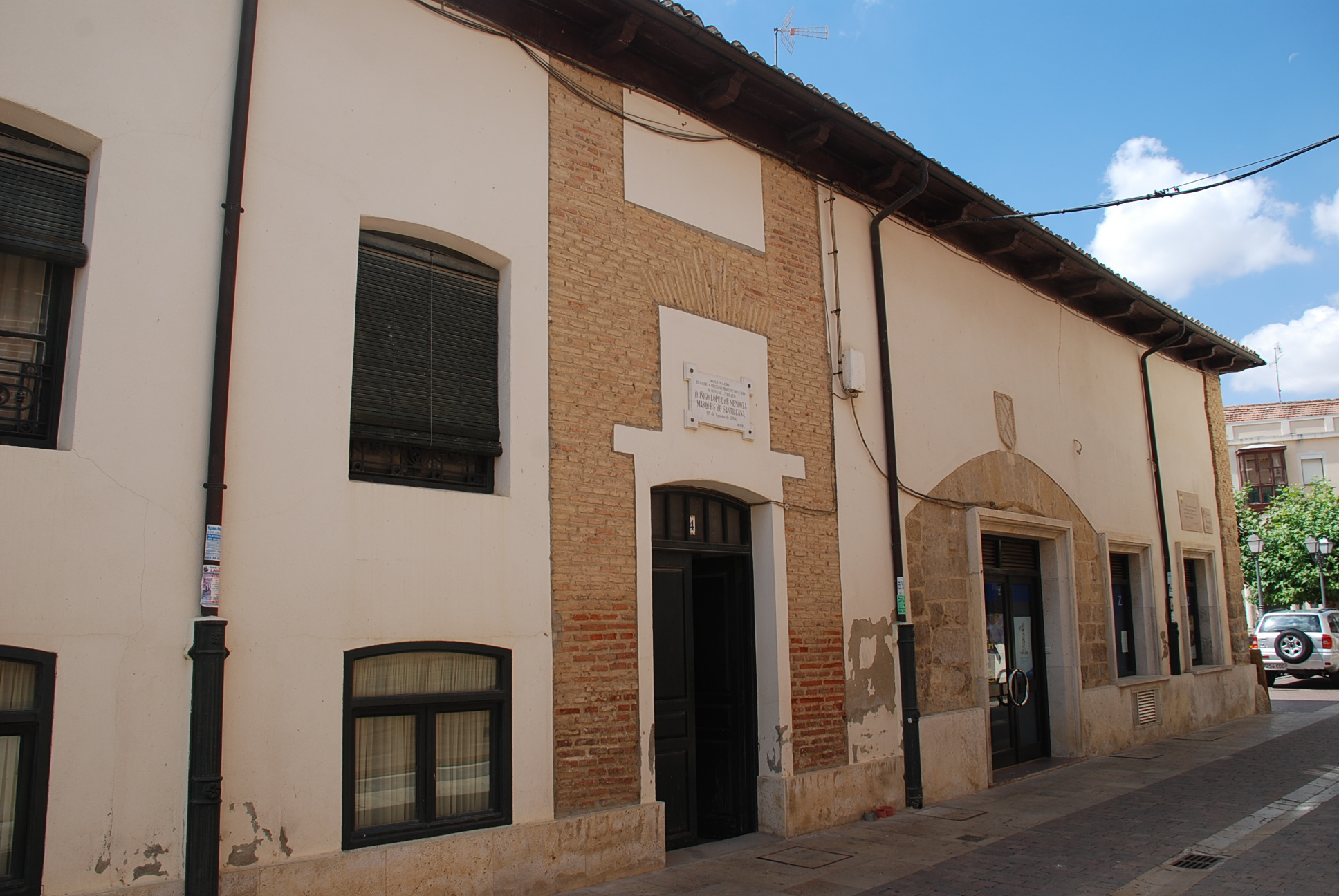
The house where Leonor Lasso de la Vega gave birth to Íñigo López de Mendoza, in Carrión de los Condes (Palencia)

Íñigo López de Mendoza, 1st Marquess of Santillana (19 August 1398 – 25 March 1458) was a Castilian politician and poet who held an important position in society and literature during the reign of John II of Castile.

== Biography ==
He was born at Carrión de los Condes in Old Castile to a noble family which figured prominently in the arts. His grandfather, Pedro González de Mendoza I, and his father, Diego Hurtado de Mendoza, Admiral of Castile, were both poets with close ties to the great literary figures of the time: Chancellor Lopez de Ayala, Fernán Pérez de Guzmán and Gómez Manrique.

His mother, Doña Leonor Lasso de la Vega, was a wealthy heiress belonging to the House of Lasso de la Vega.

Lopez de Mendoza's father died when he was five years old, which brought his family into financial difficulties. Part of his childhood was spent living in his grandmother's household, and in the home of his uncle, the future Archbishop of Toledo. As a youth, he spent time in the court of king Alfonso V of Aragón, where he was exposed to the work of poets in the Provençal, Valencia and Catalan traditions, the classic Humanist works of Virgil and Dante Alighieri, and the lyricism of troubadours such as Enrique de Villena.

In 1412, Don Íñigo married a wealthy heiress, Catarina Suárez de Figueroa. With this union, he acquired great fortune and became one of the most powerful nobles of his time. His sixth son from the marriage would one day become Cardinal Mendoza.

As a politician, Don Íñigo remained loyal to Juan II throughout his life, for which he was richly rewarded with land and the title of Marquess of Santillana in 1445, after the First Battle of Olmedo. When his wife Doña Catarina de Figueroa died, the Marquess retired to his palace of Guadalajara to spend the rest of his life in peaceful study and contemplation.

Lopez de Mendoza was a great admirer of Dante Alighieri and his work is categorized within the allegorical-Dantesque School. He also assimilated Petrarch and Giovanni Boccaccio's Humanism.

He is especially remembered for his "serranillas", which are small poems that focus on commonplace subjects. He also wrote pastoral novels inspired by French tradition, and was the originator of the Castilian Sonnet.

== Children ==
- Diego Hurtado de Mendoza, 1st Duke of the Infantado (1417-1479)
- Pedro Lasso de Mendoza, señor del valle del Lozoya
- Íñigo López de Mendoza, 1st count of Tendilla (1418-1458)
- Mencía de Mendoza (1421-1500), married Pedro Fernández de Velasco, 2nd Count of Haro
- Lorenzo Suárez de Mendoza y Figueroa, Conde de la Coruña (died 1481)
- Pedro González de Mendoza (1428-1495), cardinal and confidant of Queen Isabella I of Castile
- Juan Hurtado de Mendoza, señor de Colmenar, El Cardoso y El Vado, grandfather of conquistador Pedro de Mendoza
- Maria de Mendoza, married Per Afán de Ribera, Adelantado mayor of Andalucía
- Leonor de la Vega y Mendoza, married Gastón I de la Cerda, 4th Count de Medinaceli
- Pedro Hurtado de Mendoza, señor de Tamajón

== Bibliography ==
English

- Campbell, Gordon (2003). The Oxford Dictionary of the Renaissance. Oxford: Oxford University Press. ISBN 0-19-860175-1.
- Foster, David William (1971). The Marqués de Santillana. New York: Twayne Publishers.
- Gerli, E. Michael (2003). "Lopez de Mendoza, Inigo". In Gerli, E. Michael (ed.). Medieval Iberia : an encyclopedia. New York: Routledge. ISBN 0-415-93918-6.
- Chisholm, Hugh, ed. (1911). "Santillana, Iñigo Lopez de Mendoza, Marquis of" . Encyclopædia Britannica. Vol. 24 (11th ed.). Cambridge University Press. p. 194.

Spanish

- Moreno, Ángel Gómez. "Íñigo López de Mendoza". Real Academia de la Historia.
- Obras, edited by José Amador de los Ríos (Madrid, 1852)
- Marcelino Menéndez y Pelayo, Antologia de poetas liricas castellanos (Madrid, 1894), vol. v. pp. 78–144
- B. Sanvisenti, I Primi Influssi di Dante, del Petrarca e del Boccaccio suite letteratura spagnuola (Milan, 1902), pp. 127–186.
