= Serranilla =

Poetic genre in Spanish literature

A serranilla is a genre of short poem in Spanish literature which focuses on commonplace subjects, the best known authors of which were Juan Ruiz also known as the Arcipreste de Hita (Por la ruta serrana del Arcipreste) and Íñigo López de Mendoza, 1st Marquis of Santillana.
