= Garci Lasso de la Vega II =

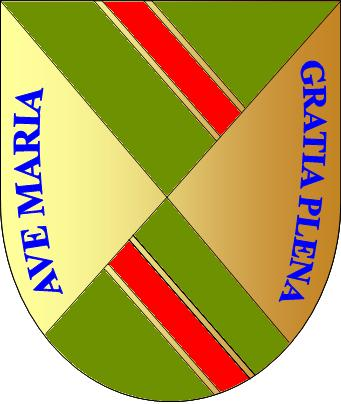
Coat of Arms of the House of Lasso de la Vega.

Garci Lasso de la Vega II, also known as "El Joven" ( ? - Burgos, 1351) was the son of Garci Lasso de la Vega "El Viejo" with his first wife, Juana de Castañeda. He commanded Castilian troops against Navarra in the Battle of Río Salado of 1334. After distinguishing his valor, he was appointed as the highest royal official to the court of Fadrique Alfonso de Castilla, master of the Order of Santiago and son of Alfonso XI of Castile. He was later appointed Adelantado of Castile through the patronage of Juan Núñez de Lara. After the death of his patron, he sought refuge in Burgos, fearing the wrath of Juan Alfonso de Alburquerque. King Peter the Cruel and his henchmen captured him there where he suffered an atrocious death witnessed by the king in 1351, as reported by Pero López de Ayala in his chronicle on the reign of this monarch.

== Inheritance ==
In divvying up his father's estate after his death in 1338, Lasso de la Vega inherited land across the Kingdom in the following areas; Asturias de Santillana, including estates in Udías and in Cabuérniga which was accompanied by tenements in Carmona, properties in Santibáñez de Carrejo, Bárcena de Puente de San Miguel, Valles-Helgueras, tenements in Viérnoles, shared lands in Arenas and the family estates of Mercadal y Mijares, He also inherited lands given to his father by the King. These included the family estates of Cudón and the castle of Guardo with keep and towns except that of Torremormojón which went to Urraca Rodríguez de Rojas. As compensation, he received the castle of Lucio.

== Marriages and Descendants ==
He married twice. The first time with Urraca Rodríguez de Rojas, daughter of Juan Rodríguez de Rojas, with whom he had no children.

His second marriage was with Leonor González de Cornado (a surname which would later change to Coronado) daughter of Gonzalo Rodríguez de Cornado and Elvira Arias. The widow Leonor appears in the documentation of the Convent of Santa Clara in Astudillo, Palencia, where she sold a silver cross with precious stones for 10,000 maravedíes to María de Padilla. The children from this marriage are as follows.

- Garci Lasso Ruiz de la Vega (b. 1340 — d. 2 April 1367).
- Gonzalo Ruiz de la Vega
- Sancho Lasso de la Vega

== Will ==
He executed a will on 3 October 1349 before the siege of Gibraltar in which he asked to be buried at the Convent of Santa Clara and Castrojeriz and mentioned his two wives. He left some properties to his brother-in-law Diego Rodríguez de Rojas and refers to his mother-in-law, Sancha, the wife of Juan Rodríguez de Rojas, the father of his first wife.

His second wife, Leonor, executed a will on 12 April 1378 also asking to be buried at the same convent as her husband and mentioning her children, Gonzalo and Sancho, and a grandson named Gonzalo.

Preceded by Garci Lasso de la Vega I	Head of the House of Lasso de la Vega –1351	Succeeded by Garci Lasso Ruiz de la Vega

== Bibliography ==
- Estepa Díez, Carlos (2003). Las Behetrías Castellanas (in Spanish). Vol. 2. Junta de Castilla y León, Consejería de Cultura y Turismo. ISBN 84-9718-119-0. OCLC 834612492.
- López de Ayala, Pero (1991). Crónicas de los Reyes de Castilla, Don Pedro, Don Enrique II, Don Juan I y Don Enrique III, Edición, prólogo y notas de José Luis Martín, Catedrático de la Universidad de Salamanca. Editorial Planeta. ISBN 84-320-6965-5.
- Vaca Lorenzo, Ángel (1983), "Documentación Medieval de la Villa de Astudillo (Palencia)", Publicaciones de la Institución Tello Téllez de Meneses, 48: 29–100, ISSN 0210-7317
