= Armuña de Tajuña =

Armuña de Tajuña, Spain
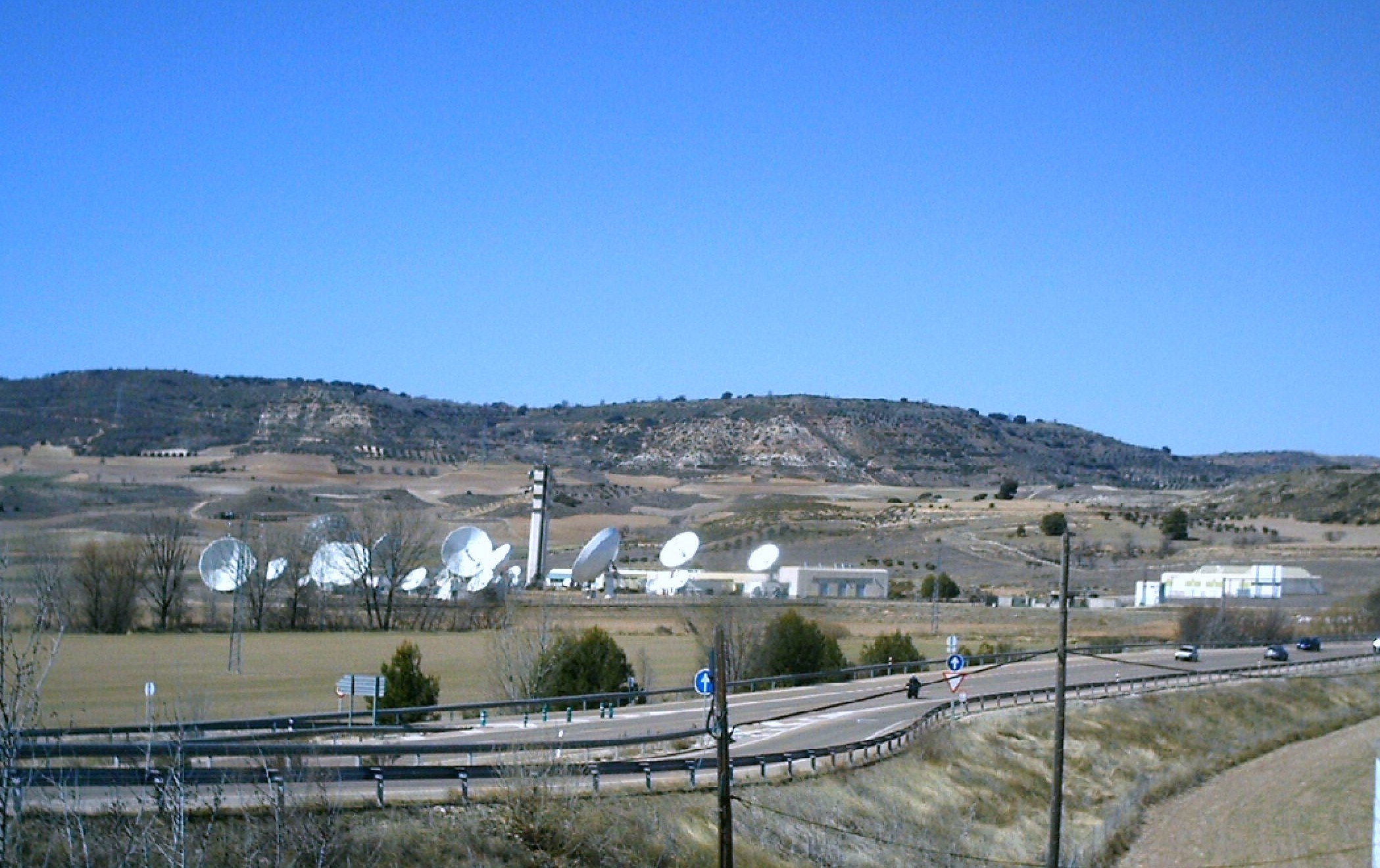

- Coat of arms

- Location within Province of Guadalajara Location within Castilla-La Mancha Location within Spain
- Coordinates: 40°31′55″N 3°01′49″W
- Country: Spain
- Autonomous community: Castile-La Mancha
- Province: Guadalajara
- Municipality: Armuña de Tajuña

Area
  - Total: 20 km^{2} (7.7 sq mi)

Population (2025-01-01)
  - Total: 280
  - Density: 14/km^{2} (36/sq mi)
- Time zone: UTC+1 (CET)
  - Summer (DST): UTC+2 (CEST)

Armuña de Tajuña is a municipality located in the province of Guadalajara, Castile-La Mancha, Spain. According to the 2004 census (INE), the municipality has a population of 122 inhabitants.
