= Manquillos =

Coordinates: 42°12′N 4°34′W

- municipality
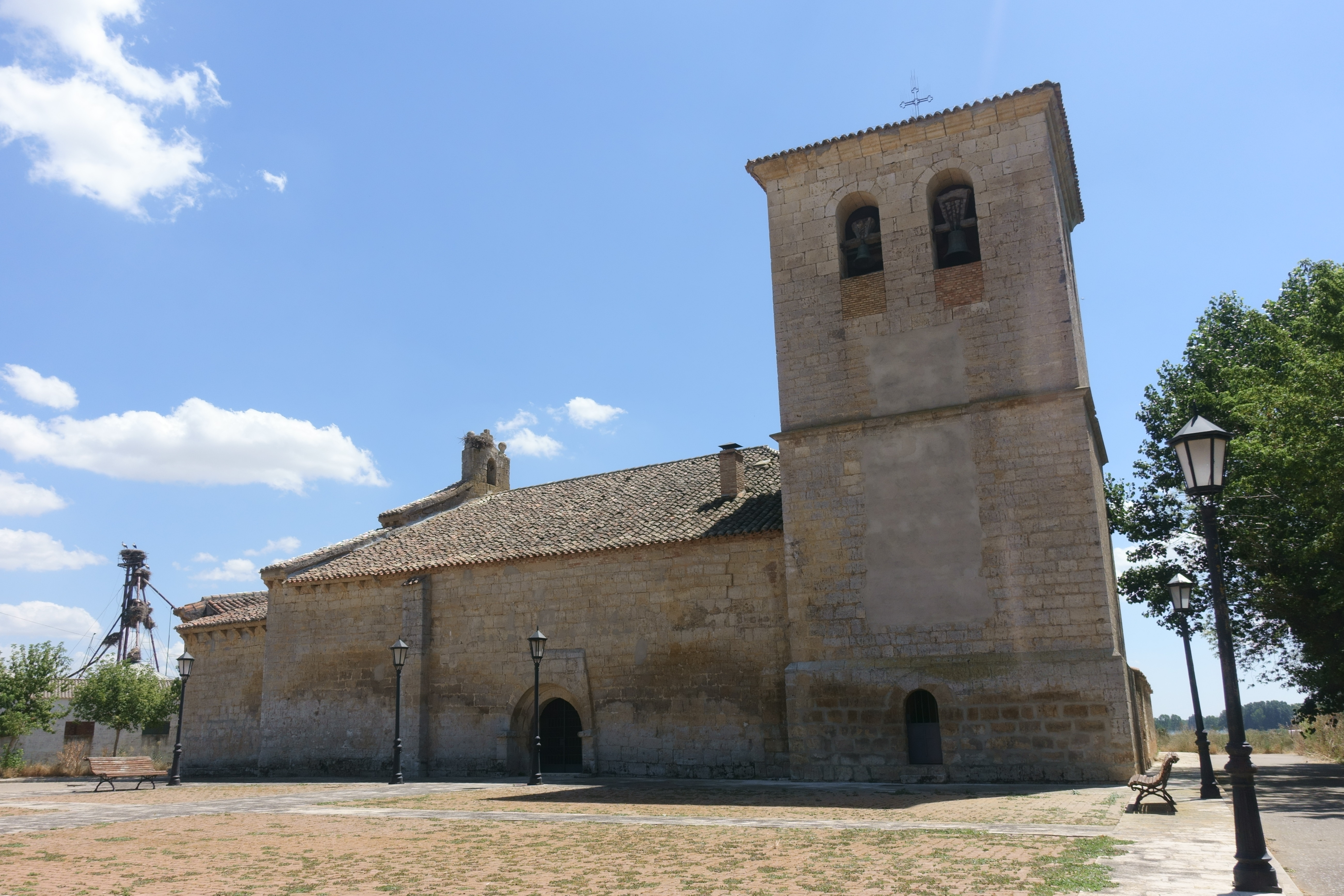
- Interactive map of Manquillos
- Country: Spain
- Autonomous community: Castile and León
- Province: Palencia
- Municipality: Manquillos

Area
  - Total: 12 km^{2} (4.6 sq mi)

Population (2025-01-01)
  - Total: 62
  - Density: 5.2/km^{2} (13/sq mi)
- Time zone: UTC+1 (CET)
  - Summer (DST): UTC+2 (CEST)
- Website: Official website

Manquillos is a municipality located in the province of Palencia, Castile and León, Spain. According to the 2004 census (INE), the municipality has a population of 63 inhabitants.
