= Astudillo, Palencia =

Coordinates: 42°11′N 4°17′W

Astudillo (Statilium, Stutilium, Studellum)
- Municipality
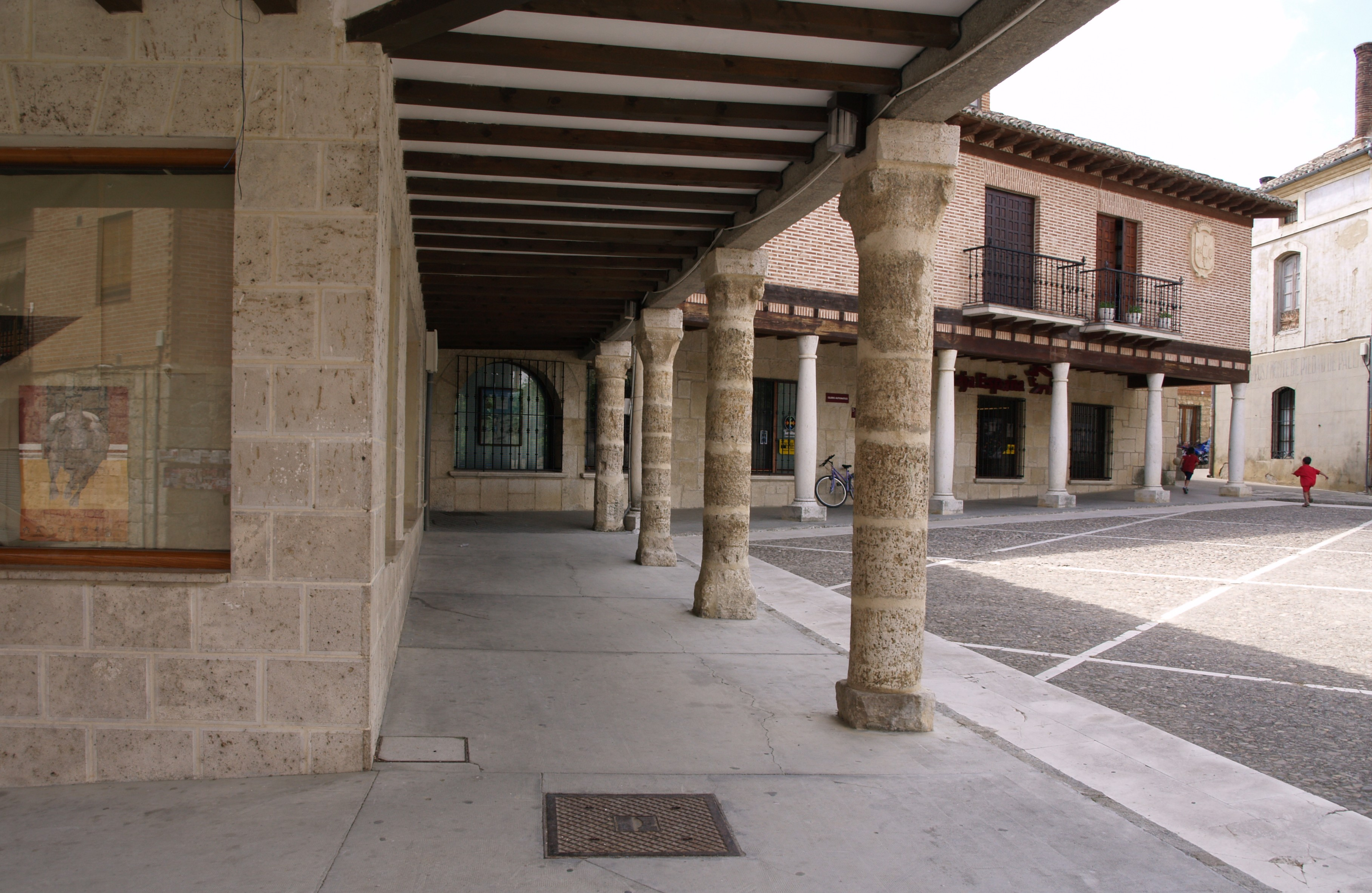

- Coat of arms
- Motto: In primis nobilis Villa Stutilium – Viri sui fidelissimi
- Interactive map of Astudillo
- Country: Spain
- Autonomous communities of Spain: Castile and León
- Province: Palencia
- Comarca: El Cerrato, Tierra de Campos
- Established: 1st century BC

Government
  - Mayor: Luis Santos González (PP)

Area
  - Total: 122.95 km^{2} (47.47 sq mi)
- Elevation: 780 m (2,560 ft)

Population (2025-01-01)
  - Total: 1,041
- Postal code: 34450
- Area code: 979 822
- Website: Astudillo Town Council

Astudillo is a Spanish municipality in the autonomous community of Castilla y León belonging to the province of Palencia. It is located 29 km (18 mi) northeast of the provincial capital, and has 1,041 inhabitants (2025) with an area of 122.95 km^{2} (47.47 sq mi).

== Toponym ==
The name Astudillo comes from Roman times, specifically from Tito Estatilio Tauro (Titus Statilius Taurus), the Roman general whose legions had their field operations in this Vaccaei region around the year 29 BC.

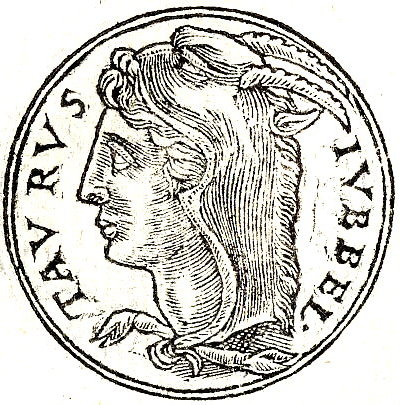
A depiction of Titus Statilius Taurus (I) from the Promptuarii Iconum Insigniorum Published by Guillaume Rouille (1518–1589)

According to historical records, the name evolved from Ancient Latin in the times of Augustus to modern Castilian: Statilium, Stutilium, Stitellum, Stutellium, Stutiellum, Stutiello, Studellum, Astutello, Astodello, Estodello, Estudillo, Astudil and Astudillo.

STUTILIUM can be found in the motto of the official Coat of Arms of the municipality of Astudillo.

Escudo de Astudillo

== History ==
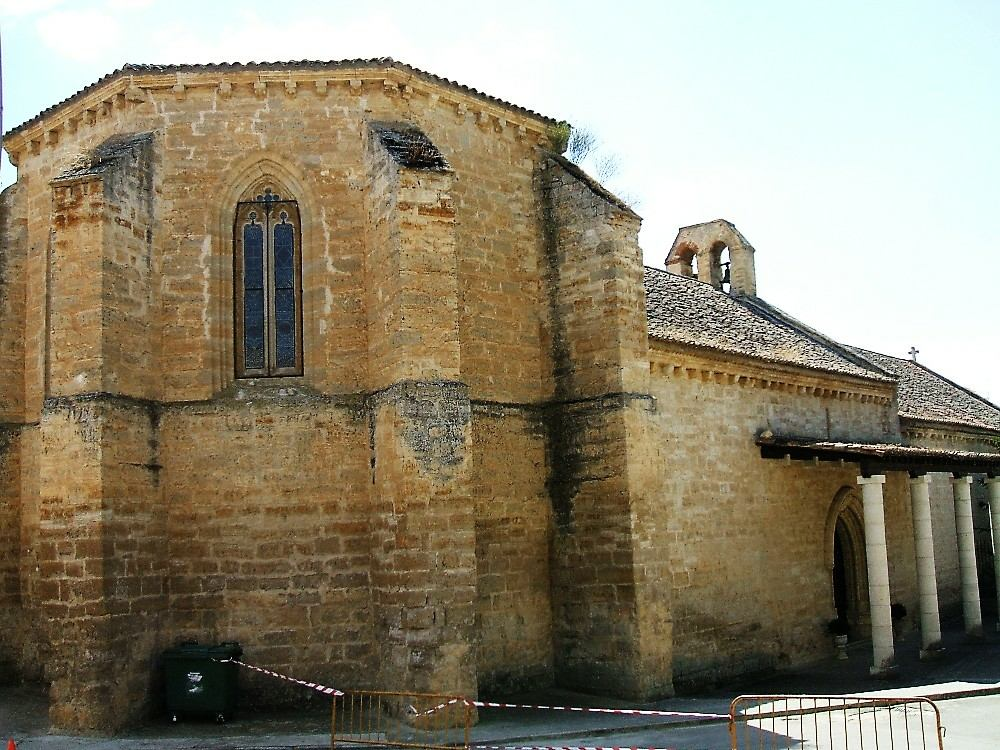
Real Monasterio de Santa Clara founded by María de Padilla, mistress of King Peter I of Castile

Astudillo has ancient origins, Roman remains having been found within its surroundings. In the Middle and modern ages it was involved in textile production. It was declared a Historic-Artistic Site in 1995. In the municipality there are several churches, the Castle of La Mota and the Convent of Santa Clara. The origins of Astudillo are prehistoric, having been located within its area several settlements from the Bronze Age and Iron Age. Astudillo and the region were already occupied in Roman times.

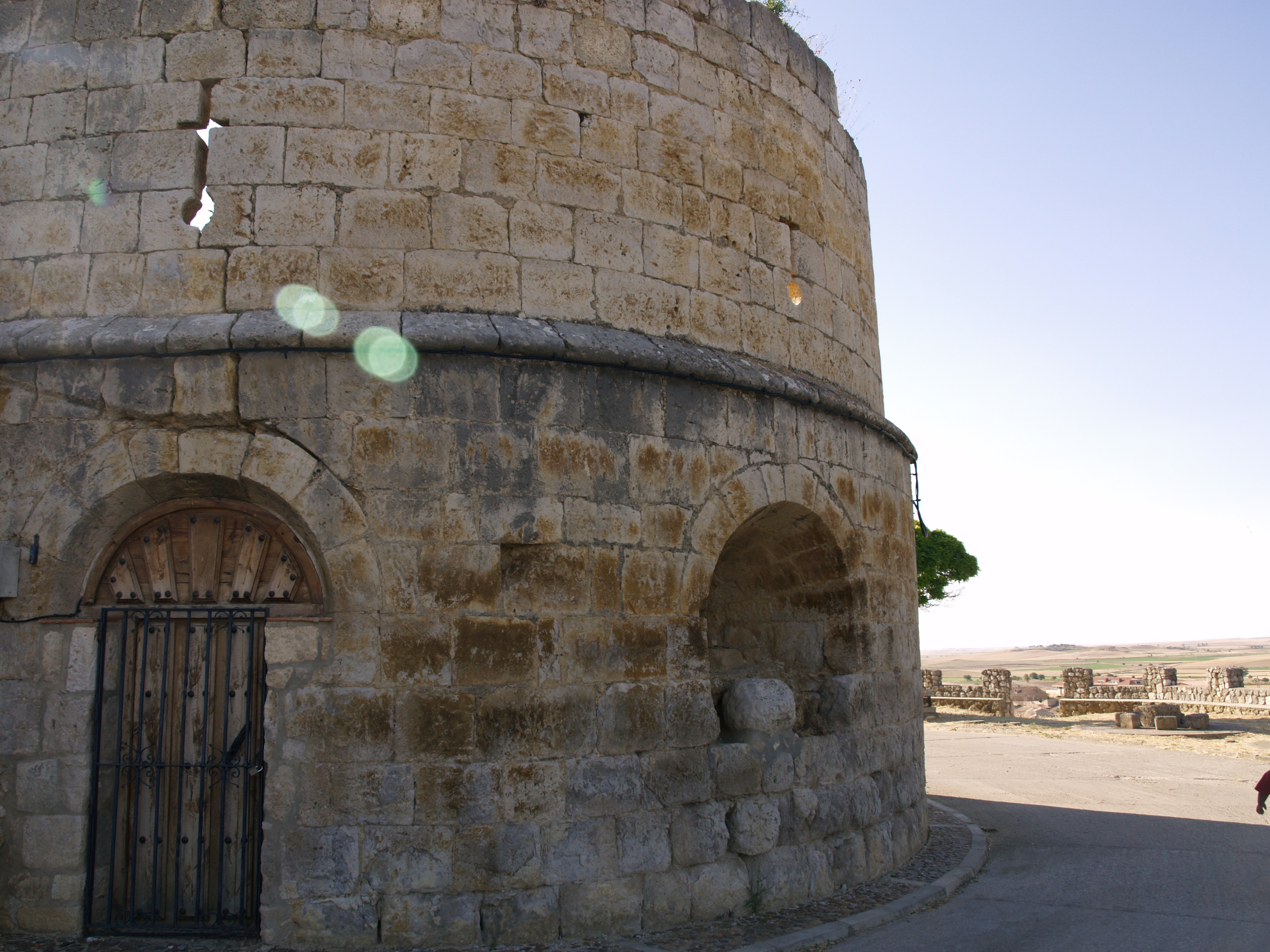
Castle of Astudillo

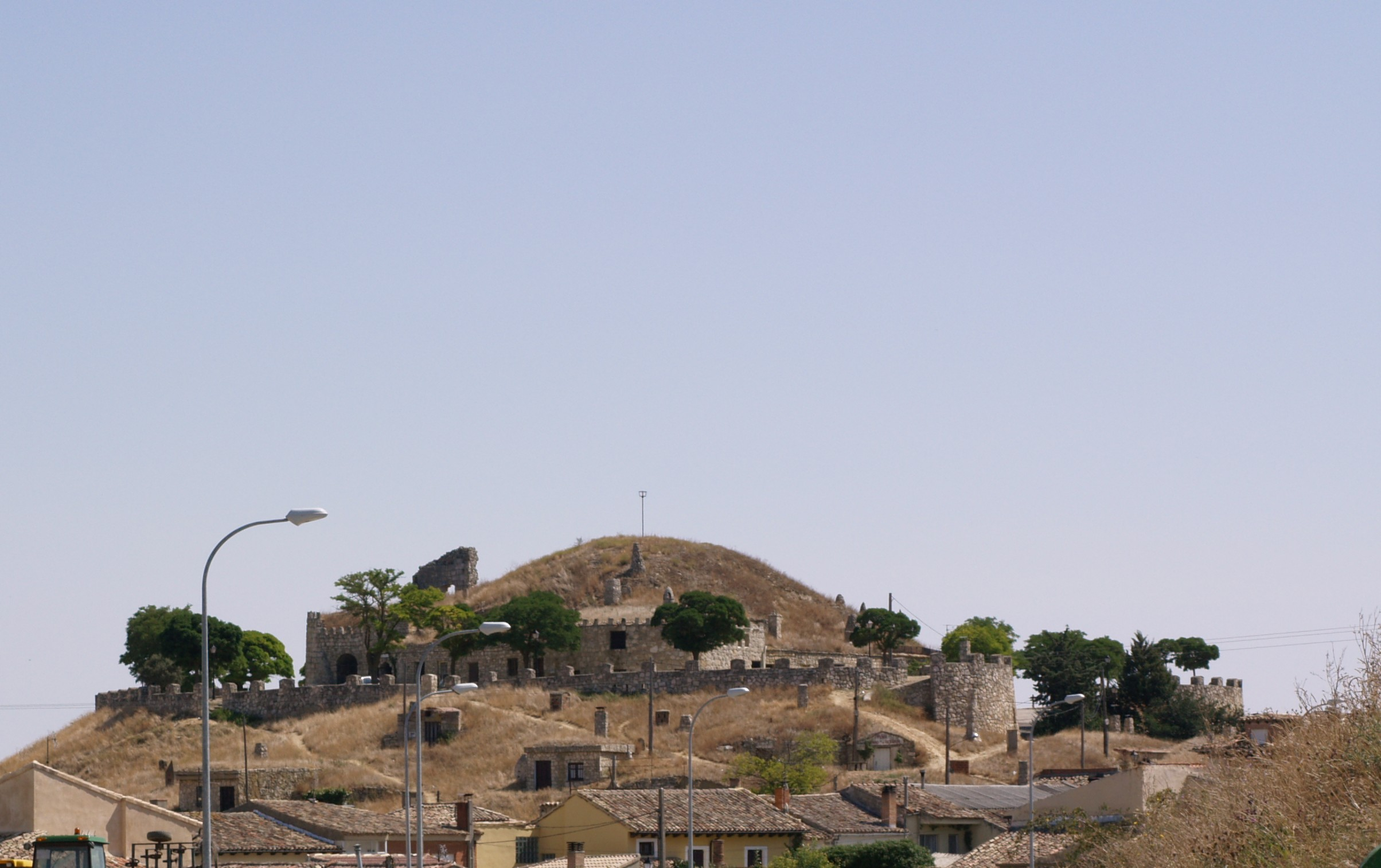
Castle of Astudillo

In the 11th century, Astudillo was already head of Alfoz, so the town was a walled place from early medieval times, you can still see one of the six gates it had, the gate of San Martin, of the others only remains their memory and their names: Revilla, Santa Eugenia, San Pedro, Santa Clara and Santoyo. In the middle of the twelfth century, King Alfonso VII, granted privileges to the knights of Astudillo consisting in a wide range of exemptions and freedoms.

In the thirteenth century, King Ferdinand III of León & Castile, ratified the charter of the town and extended with rights of merchandise, making it an important stronghold.

Throughout history several queens boasted the lordship of the town. In the twelfth century, it was Eleanor of England, Queen of Castile, wife of Alfonso VIII of Castile. During the thirteenth century, it was the lordship of his daughter Berenguela, and later of Violant of Aragon, wife of Alfonso X the Wise . In the 14th century, it was the lordship of María de Molina, who stifled the attempt to occupy the village by the rebel Juan Núñez de Lara. King Peter of Castile and his lover, María de Padilla, who seems to have been born in the town, made Astudillo their habitual residence, having there the king's palace and the queen without a crown. In 1353, Maria de Padilla founded the Convent of Santa Clara, which can still be admired today. Beatrice, daughter of María de Padilla and the king, was the lady of the town. Juan II of Castile established his chancellery in Astudillo. Later the town passesd to the lordship of Ruy Díaz de Mendoza whose heirs would be counts of Castrojeriz. In 1520, the town of Astudillo adheres to the communal uprising, joining the Junta de Burgos.

As a single town, Astudillo was one of the fourteen villages that made up the Castrojeriz district, which formed the Burgos commune, in the period between 1785 and 1833. In the 1787 Floridablanca Census, Astudillos fell under the ordinary jurisdiction of the Mayoralty lordship.

Astudillo was head of the judicial district from 1834 until the 1970s.

== Politics ==
List of mayors since the democratic elections of 1979
Term	Name of Mayor	Political Party
1979–1983	Luis Alberto Nebreda	Union of the Democratic Centre (Spain)
1983–1987	Luis Alberto Nebreda	Popular Alliance (Spain)
1987–1991	Glicerio Castro, from 1988 María Soledad Varela	PSOE
1991–1995	Eugenio Duque Bustillo	Popular Party (Spain)
1995–1999	Eugenio Duque Bustillo	Popular Party (Spain)
1999–2003	Agustín Manrique González	PSOE
2003–2007	Luis Santos González	Popular Party (Spain)
2007–2011	Luis Santos González	Popular Party (Spain)
2011–	Luis Santos González	Popular Party (Spain)

== Demography ==
=== Population ===
Demographic evolution
1842	1857	1860	1877	1887	1897	1900	1910	1920	1930	1940	1950	1960	1970	1981	1991	2001	2011	2016
451	4 396	426	326	373	312	080	286	503	768	259	263	222	910	623	374	127	1106	1 004

== Economy ==
Astudillo's main activity include agriculture, the food industry and electricity production. There are several wind farms around the village, along with a 1 MW photovoltaic system and some other smaller ones.

== Famous residents ==
- Peter I, King of Castile.

Escudo de Pedro I de Castilla

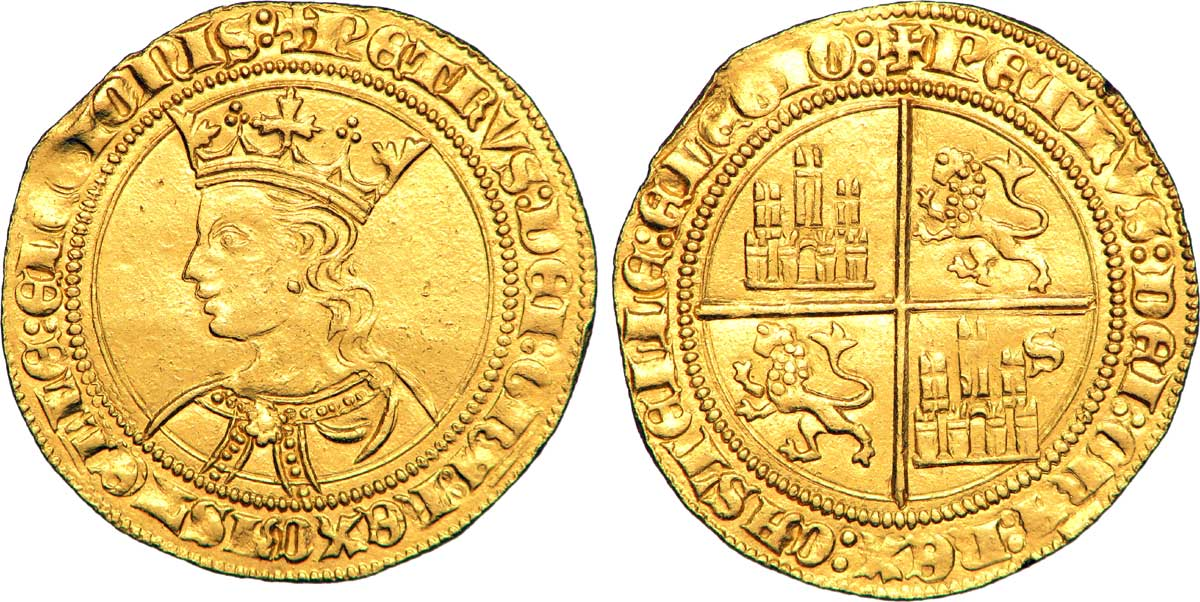
Dobla de 35 maravedíes de Pedro I de Castilla

- María de Padilla.

Arms of María de Padilla

- Juan de Tapia, guerrilla fighter.
- César Arconada, writer and journalist born in Palacios del Alcor.
- Marcelino García Velasco, poet and academian of the Institución Tello Téllez de Meneses born in the capital of Palencia, but spent his childhood in Astudillo.
- Carlos Bustillo, journalist.
- Oscar Husillos, athlete.

== Bibliography ==
- Castrillo Martínez, Maximiliano (1877). Opusculo Sobre la Historia de la Villa de Astudillo (Booklet on the history of the Villa de Astudillo) (in Spanish). Editorial Maxtor.España. ISBN 84-95636-04-2.
