= Garci Sánchez de Badajoz =

Spanish writer & poet (c.1460–c.1534)

Garci Sánchez de Badajoz (1460?–1534?) was a Spanish writer and poet. He was an author of lovers' complaints which were popular with the poets of the Renaissance. He was last recorded attending a Toledan imperial feast in 1525 according to an eyewitness account by Francesillo de Zúñiga, a private servant of the Emperor. However, it is thought he lived much later than that. Gregorio Silvestre, an admirer of the poet, met with him while in the service of Conde de Feria. Silvestre, born in 1520, entered into de Feria's service at fourteen years old, suggesting that Sánchez de Badajoz was still alive in at least 1534. It can also be inferred from Silvestre's writings that the poet was the head of a school of poets who continued to develop Spanish poetic forms.

Sánchez de Badajoz was either imprisoned or housebound for a purported insanity. The reason for the imprisonment is a mystery. Traditionally, it was thought to be due to an insanity brought on by an incestuous love for his sister, but some speculate it was actually due to the blasphemous nature of some of his works. He himself attributes his madness to unrequited love in his poem Garcisánchez preguntádole su amiga que cómo auía bastado ella a tornalle loco. He was thought to be mad long after he was free from jail, according to Francesillo de Zúñiga.

His family came from the low Extremaduran nobility of Badajoz but in the 15th century they settled in Écija. The General Songbook (1511) includes a large number of his compositions, including eight poems. Five villancicos and three canciones are found in the Cancionero de Palacio and others appear in loose sheets and in the Romance Songbook. According to Fray Jerónimo Román, Sánchez de Badajoz was an eminent musician who played the vihuela.

== Works ==
=== Villancicos ===
- Mi mal por bien es tenido

=== Madrigals ===
- Puse mis amores en tan buen lugar
