= Pedro Núñez de Guzmán =

- Lord of Guzman, Roa and Gumiel
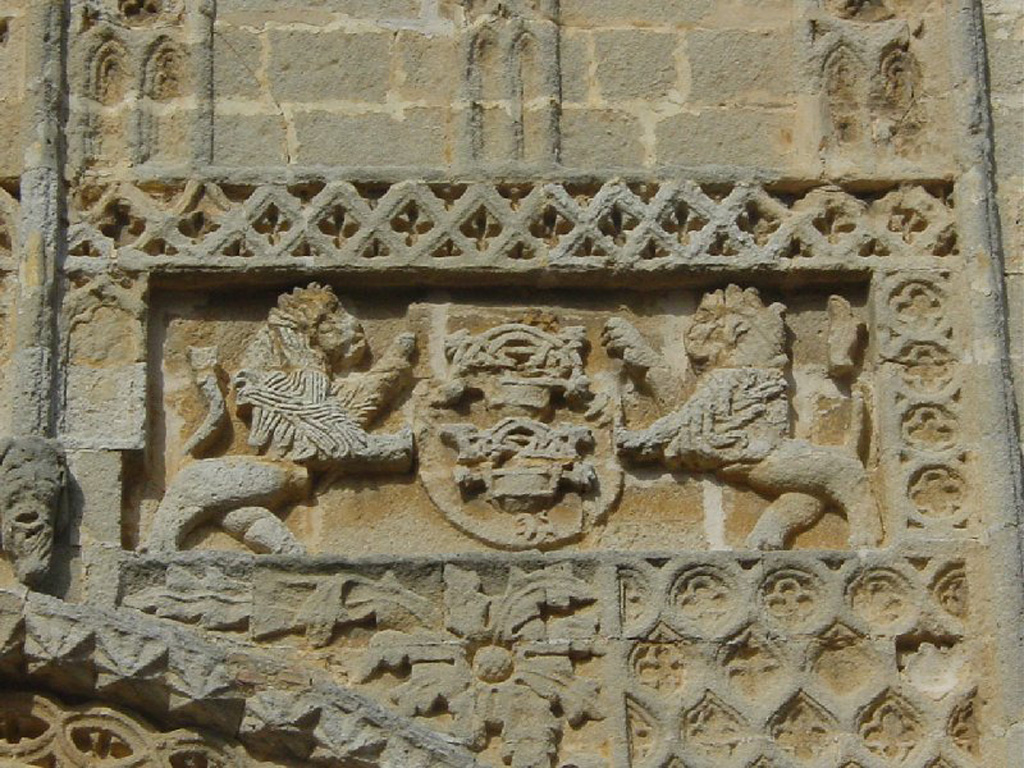
- Coat of arms of the Pérez de Guzmán, present in the Parish Nuestra Señora de la O
- Born: 12th-century Sevilla, Spain
- Died: 13th-century Sevilla, Spain
- Noble family: House of Guzmán
- Spouse: Urraca Garcia de Roa
- Occupation: military and juzge

Pedro Núñez de Guzmán (12th-century) was a Seville nobleman, Lord of Guzmán.

== Biography ==
Pedro was the son of Nuño Perez de Guzman and Urraca Mendez de Sousa. His mother was born in Portugal, daughter of Mendo de Sousa. He was married to Urraca García, daughter of García Ordóñez de Aza, Lord of Gumiel of Mercado.

Pedro Núñez de Guzmán was descendant of Rodrigo Muñoz de Guzmán, lord of Roa and Guzmán (Burgos).
