= Adelantado =

Spanish noble title during the Middle Ages

Adelantado (UK: /ˌædəlænˈtɑːdoʊ/, US: /-lɑːnˈ-/, Spanish: [aðelanˈtaðo]; meaning 'advanced') was a title held by some Spanish nobles in service of their respective kings during the Middle Ages. It was later used as a military title held by some Spanish conquistadores of the 15th, 16th and 17th centuries.

Adelantados were granted directly by the monarch the right to become governors and justices of a specific region, which they were charged with conquering, in exchange for funding and organizing the initial explorations, settlements and pacification of the target area on behalf of the Crown of Castile. These areas were usually outside the jurisdiction of an existing audiencia or viceroy, and adelantados were authorized to communicate directly with the Council of the Indies.

== The reconquista ==
The term has its origins in the reconquista and comes from the phrase por adelantado (Spanish: 'in advance', although translations stating 'one who goes before' and 'the forward man' are also found). It is a calque of Arabic Muqaddam (مقدم) which has the exact same meaning. According to the Siete Partidas, the office of adelantado was the equivalent of the Roman praefectus urbi (transl. urban prefect).

The earliest definitively known adelantado was appointed by Alfonso X in 1253 in the recently conquered territory of La Frontera (Andalusia). However the office had precedents in the duties and rights held by some officers of the Navarrese dynasty of Castile and León, and Álvar Fáñez or Fortún Sánchez in the Ebro valley performed similar services in detached territories beyond the frontier. It was during this time that the Siete Partidas, commissioned by Alfonso X, more precisely defined the powers of the office.

That law code created the position of an adelantado mayor, who was at the same time an intermediary appellate judge, located in the judicial hierarchy between local justices and the king's court, and an executive officer, who as a direct representative of the king was charged with implementing royal orders in his assigned area. Most appointees were from the upper nobility or the royal family. After its success in Andalusia, the institution was introduced in the northern areas of the peninsula, merging with and becoming indistinguishable from an older judicial office, the Royal Merinos.

== Overseas ==
Beyond the peninsula, the term adelantado was granted to Alonso Fernández de Lugo in the conquest of the Canary Islands and was confirmed to members of his family. The term became modified over time. During the colonization of the Americas and the Spanish East Indies (Asia), each charter specified different powers to each adelantado, sometimes in a vague manner, which often led to confusion as in the case between Juan de Oñate and the Viceroy of New Spain.

The title was granted both as an inheritable title and one that lasted for the grantee's life only. With the publication of the Ordinances Concerning Discoveries (Ordenanzas de descubrimientos, nueva población y pacificación de las Indias) in 1573, the attributes of adelantados became regularized, although the title was granted much less often after this date, especially since the institutions of audiencias, governors and viceroys had been developed.

Nevertheless, the Ordinances are useful because they illustrate the powers adelantados often had. The Ordinances established that adelantados, in their capacity as governors and justices of the new territories, had the right to hear civil and criminal cases in appeal, to name the regidores and employees of the cabildos of any towns founded, to name interim treasury officials, to issue ordinances on the use of land and mines, to establish districts, and to organize militias and name their captains.

The adelantado grants of Charles V prior to the establishment of the Viceroyalty of Peru

The first use of the title adelantado in the Americas was by Bartholomew Columbus, brother of Christopher Columbus, who governed Hispaniola under this title during his brother's absence from 1494 to 1498. It was later inherited by Diego Colón after much litigation. Other conquistadors who were granted the title include:

- 1512: Juan Ponce de León for Florida and Biminí, renewed in 1524 for his son, Luis
- 15??: Rodrigo de Bastidas for the Isthmus of Panama and Santa Marta
- 1514: Vasco Núñez de Balboa for the South Sea
- 1518: Ferdinand Magellan for the Spice Islands
- 1518: Diego Velázquez de Cuéllar for Yucatán
- 1527: Pánfilo de Narváez for Florida
- 1527: Pedro de Alvarado for Guatemala
- 1529: Francisco Pizarro for Peru, and Pedro de Mendoza for Argentina
- 1535: Pedro Fernández de Lugo for Santa Marta (as son of Alonso Fernández de Lugo, Adelantado of Tenerife and La Palma, he was a second-generation adelantado)
- 1537: Hernando de Soto for Florida
- 1538: Gonzalo Jiménez de Quesada for the New Kingdom of Granada
- 1540: Álvar Núñez Cabeza de Vaca for Río de la Plata
- 1549: Pedro de Valdivia for Chile
- 1565: Juan Vásquez de Coronado for Costa Rica
- 1565: Pedro Menéndez de Avilés for Florida
- 1571: Miguel López de Legazpi for the Philippines
- 1595: Alvaro de Mendaña, and after his death his wife Isabel Barreto, for the Solomon Islands, and Juan de Oñate for the Kingdom of New Mexico

== See also ==
- Captaincy
- Prefect
- Peninsulares
- Governorates of the Spanish Empire
- Greater Adelantado of Castile

== Bibliography ==
- Ayala, Manuel Josef de. Diccionario de gobierno y legislación de Indias. (Madrid: Ediciones de Cultura Hispánica, 1988) ISBN 84-7232-449-4
- Fisher, Lillian Estelle. Viceregal Administration in the Spanish American Colonies. Berkeley, University of California Press, 1926.
- García Añoveros, Jesús María. Don Pedro de Alvarado: las fuentes históricas, documentación, crónicas y biblografía existente, Mesoamérica, vol. 13 (June 1987), pp. 243–282. CIRMA: Antigua Guatemala, Guatemala ISSN 0252-9963, OCLC 7141215
- Jular Pérez-Alfaro, Cristina. Los adelantados y merinos mayores de León (siglos XIII-XV). (León: Universidad de León) ISBN 84-7719-225-1
- O'Callaghan, Joseph F. O. A History of Medieval Spain. (Ithaca, Cornell University Press, 1975) ISBN 0-8014-0880-6
- Pérez-Bustamante y González de la Vega, Rogelio. El gobierno y la administración de la Corona de Castilla. (Ediciones Aldecoa, 1976) ISBN 84-7009-188-3
- Vargas Pereira, Marco Vinicio. "El adelantantamiento en el Derecho Indiano." (Thesis, Universidad de Costa Rica, 1998)
- Vázquez Campos, Braulio. Los adelantados mayores de La Frontera o Andalucía (siglos XIII-XIV). (Seville: Diputación Provincial de Sevilla) ISBN 84-7798-230-9
