= Garci Lasso de la Vega I =

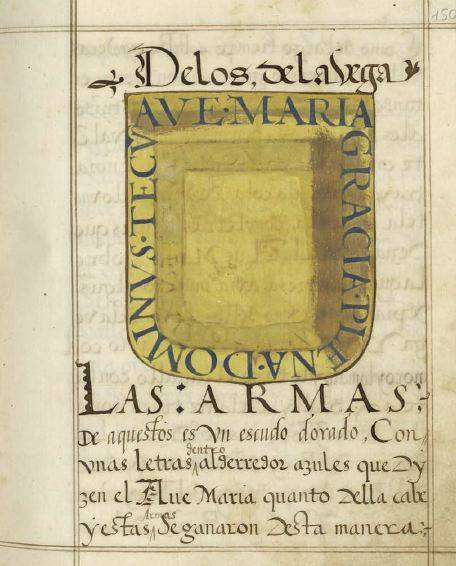
Coat of arms of the House of de la Vega

Garci Lasso de la Vega I, also known as "el Viejo" (d. 1328, Soria) was a Spanish noble in the service of King Alfonso XI of Castile. He was the chancellor of the Kingdom of Castile, an adelantado of the king. He later became the chief justice of the king and gained vast properties in Asturias de Santillana and feudal land tenures and vassal towns in more than fifteen areas throughout Castile. He went to Soria in 1328 to recruit allies against infante Don Juan Manuel who had been consistently violating the king's territories. The Spanish nobles of Soria assaulted him with crossbows, driving de la Vega to seek cover at the Convent of San Francisco where he was eventually killed. Alfonso XI punished all those responsible, ordering their execution.

== Possible ancestry ==
According to Luis de Salazar y Castro, the origin of the "de la Vega" lineage could be Diego Gómez, son of count Gómez González de Manzanedo and countess Milia Pérez de Lara. Roy Díaz de la Vega, a son of Diego Gómez, sold a property in Valdeguña in 1229 declaring that he was the son of Diego Gómez. Nevertheless, the medievalist Carlos Estepa Díez believes that there were other contemporary members of this lineage who used the toponymic "de la Vega" and there is no sufficient evidence that this was a branch of the Manzanedo family even though both families intermarried.

The first one to add "Lasso", most likely derived from medieval Castilian, meaning "tired" or "fatigued", to the toponymic was Pedro Lasso de la Vega, appointed admiral by Alfonso X of Castile in 1278.

== Marriage and descendants ==
A significant document dated the 9 March 1338, provides a detailed description of the many properties and assets of Garci Lasso de la Vega, and includes his marriages and descendants. It describes the partition of his properties upon his death among his heirs. According to this document, he married twice and had the following succession:

With Juana de Castañeda, his first wife:

- Garci Lasso de la Vega II "El Joven", assassinated by the mandate of King Peter of Castile in 1351.
- Gonzalo Ruiz de la Vega, father of Teresa González de la Vega who eventually married Pedro Ruiz de Villegas II.
- Gutier Pérez de la Vega
- María de la Vega, wife of Gutierre González de Quesada, lord of Vilagarcía.
- Urraca Lasso de la Vega, wife of Pedro Ruiz Carrillo, and mother of Garcilaso Carrillo.
- Pedro Lasso de la Vega

His second marriage was with Teresa de Sotomayor, daughter of Ruy Páez de Sotomayor (died in 1289), a magnate from Galicia, and Elvira López. Teresa was a widow of Pedro Ruiz Manrique, fourth lord of Amusco.

- Elvira Lasso de la Vega who married Ruy González de Castañeda (died in Toro in 1356), lord of Las Hormazas, and son of Diego Gómez de Castañeda and Juana Fernández de Guzmán.

== Bibliography ==
- Estepa Díez, Carlos (2003). Las Behetrías Castellanas (in Spanish). Vol. I and II. Valladolid: Junta de Castilla y León, Consejería de Cultura y Turismo. ISBN 84-9718-117-4.
- González de Fauve, María Estela (1992). La orden premonstratense en España. El Monasterio de Santa María de Aguilar de Campoo (Siglos XI-XV). Vol. II. Aguilar de Campoo (Palencia): Centro de estudios románicos. ISBN 84-600-7783-7.
- López de Ayala, Pero (1991). Crónicas de los Reyes de Castilla, Don Pedro, Don Enrique II, Don Juan I y Don Enrique III, Edición, prólogo y notas de José Luis Martín, Catedrático de la Universidad de Salamanca (in Spanish). Editorial Planeta. ISBN 84-320-6965-5.
- Salazar y Castro, Luis (1697). Historia genealógica de la Casa de Lara (in Spanish). Vol. III. Imprenta de Mateo de Llanos y Guzmán. p. 414.
