= Pero López de Ayala =

Castilian statesman

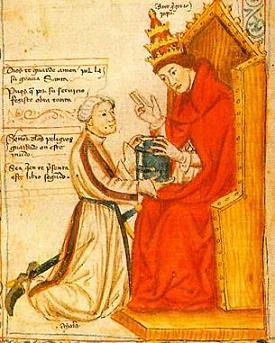
Detail from Castilian manuscript of Saint Gregory's Moralia in Job. López de Ayala kneels before Saint Gregory.

Don Pero (or Pedro) López de Ayala (1332–1407) was a Castilian statesman, historian, poet, chronicler, chancellor, and courtier.

== Life ==
Pero López de Ayala was born in 1332 at Vitoria, County of Alava, Kingdom of Castile, as the son of Fernán Pérez de Ayala and Elvira Álvarez de Cevallos. He was grandnephew to Cardinal Pedro Gómez Barroso, and was educated under this cleric. López de Ayala was a supporter of Pedro of Castile before switching sides in order to support the pretender to the Castilian throne, Henry of Trastamara.

The Ayala were one of the major aristocratic families of Castile. The earliest known record of their family was an account written by Pero's own father, which claims they descended from Pyrenees Christian royalty and linked them to the Lords of Biscay. Later, Catholic bishop Lope de Barrientos, trying to dampen anti-Semitic persecution, would claim that most of the nobility of Castile themselves had Jewish origins and that the Mendozas and Ayalas descended from a certain Rabbi Solomon and his son Isaque de Valladolid.

As Alférez mayor del Pendón de la Banda (second lieutenant), he fought with Henry at the Battle of Nájera (1367) and was made a prisoner of the Black Prince but was later released. In 1378, he traveled to France in order to negotiate an alliance against the English and Portuguese.

He subsequently served as a supporter of John I of Castile. He was captured by the Portuguese at the Battle of Aljubarrota (1385), and was jailed in a prison of iron. While in prison, he wrote his Libro de la caza de las aves ("Book on hunting with birds of prey") and parts of his Rimado de Palacio. He was ransomed for 30,000 doubloons after many had interceded on his behalf, including his wife, Doña Leonor de Guzmán, the Master of Calatrava, and the kings of both Castile and France.

Upon his release in 1388 or 1389, he continued his diplomatic activities in France. He later returned to Castile, where he was named Canciller mayor ("grand chancellor of the realm") by Henry III. He died at Calahorra at the age of 75.

== Literary career ==
López de Ayala is best remembered for his satirical and didactic Libro Rimado de Palacio ("Palace Verse" or "Rhymes of the Court"), in which he acidly describes his contemporaries and their social, religious, and political values. His rhymed confession concerns the Ten Commandments, mortal sins, spiritual works, and the sins associated with the five senses, followed by an account of the evils afflicting the Church. The most famous couplets (424–719) concern "los fechos de Palaçio" ("palace deeds"), which detail the troubles of a courtier who is attempting to collect money that the king owes to him.

In one of the first known literary references to chivalresque tales, López de Ayala, in his Rimado de Palacio, would regret a misspent youth:

It pleased me, moreover, to hear, many times,

Books of idle pursuit and proven fictions,

Amadis and Lancelot and invented falsities,

In which I wasted long hours of my time.

In his Libro de la caza de las aves, López de Ayala attempted to compile all of the correct and available knowledge concerning falconry. In the prologue, López de Ayala explains that concerning "this art and science of the hunting with birds I heard and saw many uncertainties; such as on the plumage and characteristics and nature of the birds; such as in domesticating them and ordering them to hunt their prey; and also how to cure them when they suffer and are hurt. Of this I saw some writings that reasoned on it, but did not agree with others."

He also wrote the chronicles for the reigns of Pedro I, Henry of Trastamara (Henry II of Castile), and John I, and a partial chronicle of the reign of Henry III of Castile, collected as History of the Kings of Castile.

As a source, López de Ayala is considered to be generally reliable, as he was a witness to the events he describes. The first part of his chronicle, which covers only the reign of Pedro I, was printed at Seville in 1495. The first complete edition was printed in 1779–1780 in the collection of Crónicas Españolas, under the auspices of the Spanish Royal Academy of History.

López de Ayala also translated the works of ancient authors, such as Titus Livy and Boethius. Around 1400, for example, he translated Livy's Decades (only books 1, 2 and 4) for Henry III of Castile, working from a French version by Pierre Bersuire. He also translated the works of contemporary authors, such as Boccaccio, and continued his father's Linaje de Ayala ("Lineage of Ayala"), a genealogy.

The Castilian poet Pero Ferrús (fl. 1380) dedicated one of his cantigas to López de Ayala.

Among his direct descendants are major Spanish poets and writers Inigo Lopez de Mendoza, Jorge Manrique and Diego Hurtado de Mendoza.

== Sources ==
- (in Spanish) Artehistoria.com: Personajes
- (in Spanish) La Poesia del Siglo XIV
- (in Spanish) Biografía de Pero López de Ayala
- (in Spanish) Libro de la caza de las aves
