= Diego de Sandoval y Rojas, 9th Count of Saldaña =

Spanish noble (1587–1632

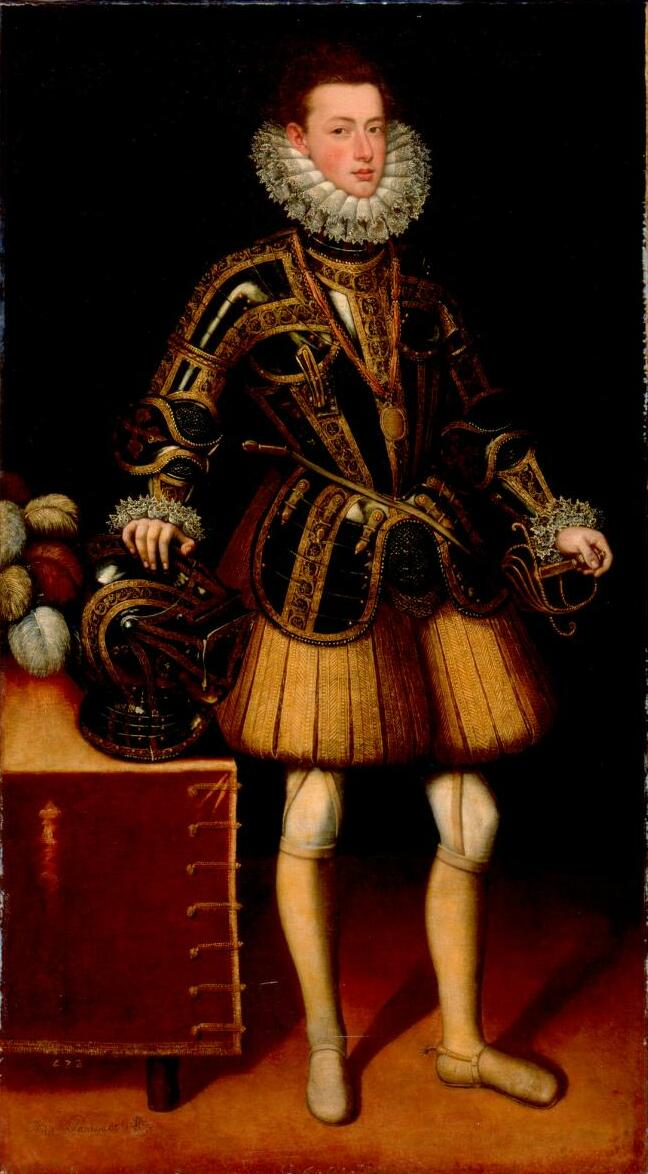
- Saldaña at the age of eighteen, as a Commander of the Order of Calatrava. Court portrait attributed to Juan Pantoja de la Cruz. National Palace of Sintra.
- Born: Diego de Sandoval y Rojas de la Cerda; Madrid
- Baptised: 2 May 1587
- Died: 16 December 1632 (aged 45)
- Occupations: Noble and patron of the Arts
- Spouses: Countess Luisa de Mendoza (m. 1603–1619) Mariana de Córdoba (m. 1621–1632)
- Children: Ana Sandoval y Mendoza, Marquise consort of Tarifa; Rodrigo, 7th Duke of the Infantado; Catalina, 8th Duchess of the Infantado
- Parents: Francisco de Sandoval y Rojas, 1st Duke of Lerma (father); Catalina de la Cerda (mother)
- Relatives: Cristóbal Gómez de Sandoval, 1st Duke of Uceda (elder brother)

Gentleman of the Bedchamber
- In office 1599–1621

Master of the Horse
- In office 1615–1621

Diego de Sandoval y Rojas de la Cerda, 9th Count of Saldaña, also referred to as Diego Gómez de Sandoval y Rojas (baptised 2 May 1587 – 7 December 1632) was a Spanish noble and patron of the Arts.

== Biography ==
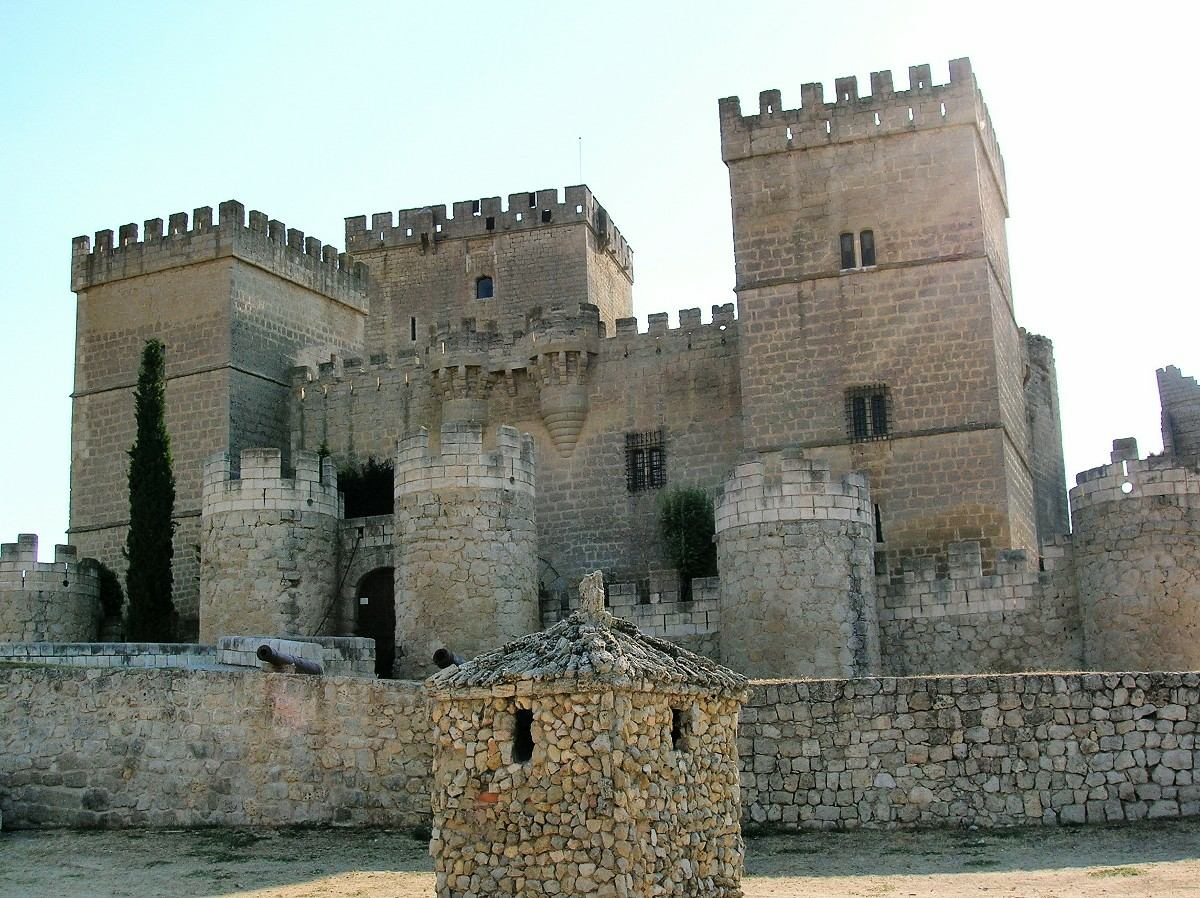
Ampudia Castle. Given its proximity to the Court, then at Valladolid (from 1601 to 1606), King Philip III was a frequent visitor.

Baptised at the Church of Santiago, Madrid (Note: The Church of Santiago was one of two churches and several houses in front of the Royal Palace, that were demolished by order of King Joseph I in the 19th century in order to build the Plaza de Oriente.) on 2 May 1587, Diego de Sandoval was the second-born son of Catalina de la Cerda and Francisco de Sandoval y Rojas. His father would, in 1599, become the powerful Duke of Lerma, favourite of Philip III, until he was brought down by his eldest son, Cristóbal Gómez de Sandoval, 1st Duke of Uceda (Diego de Sandoval's elder brother, by ten years) who, together with Luis de Aliaga, and Gaspar de Guzmán, Count-Duke of Olivares, engineered the exile of his father from the court, and Uceda's own succession to the position his father had held, in 1618, and shortly thereafter, naming Aliaga Grand Inquisitor of Spain.

In 1599, as chronicled by the Court historian Luis Cabrera de Córdoba, special dispensation was given by Pope Clement VIII to allow Diego de Sandoval to became a Grand Commander of the Order of Calatrava before having reached the statutory age of seventeen. The Commandery was given directly by Philip III, as Grand Master of the Order.

In 1603, he came into the countship of Saldaña (as count consort) through his marriage to Countess Luisa de Mendoza, heiress of the 6th Duchess of the Infantado, Ana de Mendoza. Saldaña was 16 years of age and the Countess was 21. The wedding was attended by Philip III and his wife, Queen Margaret.

In 1605, Diego de Sandoval was confined to his father's castle at Ampudia for having been involved in a brawl in Valladolid, and nearly died from a sword wound to the chest. Some years later, in 1612, he was involved in another incident which resulted in him being confined to the Ducal Palace of Lerma, punishment which was lifted thanks to the intervention of Henry of Lorraine, Duke of Mayenne, the French ambassador.

The couple's eldest daughter, Ana Sandoval y Mendoza, was born in 1612. Their son, Rodrigo, the future 7th Duke of the Infantado (through his grandmother, who outlived his mother), was born in 1614; King Philip III and the Infanta María were his godparents. Their youngest daughter, Catalina, the future 8th Duchess of the Infantado, was born in 1616.

Lope de Vega, in a letter to the Duke of Sessa, dated September 1617, described the count as "the living image of his father, discreet, kind, polite, friendly and worthy of especial consideration in this age".

Saldaña's first wife, Luisa de Mendoza, died in 1619. At the time of his wife's death, Saldaña, then Master of the Horse to the future King Philip IV, was in Lisbon accompanying King Philip III and the heir to the throne. In April 1621, Saldaña suffered the consequences of court intrigues when the new favourite Count-Duke Olivares persuaded the young King Philip IV to strip the Count of his court privileges, including his Commandery of the Order of Calatrava, for having an affair with Mariana de Córdoba, a lady-in-waiting to the Infanta María. The King forced them to marry and banished them to Pastrana. Saldaña and Mariana de Córdoba had two sons; the eldest, Diego Gómez de Sandoval, going on to become the 5th Duke of Lerma, and two daughters.

In an attempt to return to favour, Saldaña accepted a mission to Flanders, during the Dutch Revolt, and where he stayed for five years before being allowed to return to the Court in Spain when the Count-Duke no longer considered him a threat. King Philip restored his previous post of Gentleman of the Bedchamber, as well as the Commandery of the Order of Calatrava.

== Academia de Saldaña ==
In 1604 he founded the Academia de Saldaña, also known as the Academia de Madrid or Academia Castellana, an academia literaria active, in its first edition, in Madrid until 1608. Its illustrious members included Lope de Vega, Antonio Hurtado de Mendoza, Diego Duque de Estrada, Andrés de Claramonte, Francisco de Quevedo, Miguel de Cervantes, Luis de Góngora, Salas Barbadillo, Count of Villamediana, Pantaleón de Ribera and Luis Vélez de Guevara.

Other attendees, either as men of letters themselves or as patrons of the Arts, included the Duke of Feria, the Duke of Pastrana, Francisco de Borja (Prince Esquilache), Count of Lemos, the Count of Cantillana, and the Count-Duke of Olivares.

In 1611, Saldaña re-established the academy although another source states that the academy's first session was held on 15 April 1612, with an inaugural speech by Vélez de Guevara.

Among the sources that refer to Cervantes having attending Saldaña's academia is a letter by Lope to the Duke of Sessa, dated 2 March 1612, in which he comments on having had to borrow Cervantes' spectacles ("... which looked like badly fried eggs...") in order to read his own verse at that event, which he refers to, at that time, as having taken place at the "academia de Parnaso", although it would later also be known as the Academia Selvaje.

The academia finally broke up due to the animosity between two opposing factions following a violent row between Pedro Soto de Rojas and Luis Vélez de Guevara. Cervantes, and several other members, including Quevedo, Góngora, Alonso de Salas Barbadillo, Luis Vélez de Guevara, and Lope, went on to join the Academia de Parnaso, later renamed Academia Salvaje (Madrid, April 1612 – summer 1614), founded by Francisco de Silva.

Cervantes dedictated his ode "Florida y tierna rama" ["Flowered and Tender Branch"] to Saldaña and writes that he [Cervantes] lived under Saldaña's wing "a tu sombra" (cited in Herrero García, p. 507.).

== Names and titles ==
Born Diego de Sandoval y Rojas de la Cerda, he was also referred to as Diego Gómez de Sandoval y Rojas, Gómez being his father's first surname. However, on marrying Countess Luisa de Mendoza, heiress of the Duchy of the Infantado, a binding clause in her family inheritance stated that, in order to perpetuate the family name of Mendoza, he was to adopt the name Diego Hurtado de Mendoza. Although the title of Saldaña later passed to Diego de Sandoval's eldest son Rodrigo, as heir to his grandmother, the Duchess of the Infantado, Diego de Sandoval continued using it until his death, while his son Rodrigo used the title Count of Cid. The eldest son of his marriage to Mariana de Córdoba, and who would go on to become the 5th Duke of Lerma, was also Diego Gómez de Sandoval.

== Portrait ==
The National Palace of Sintra in Portugal has a full-length court portrait of Saldaña at the age of eighteen, from the Spanish school, attributed to Juan Pantoja de la Cruz who, in 1602, had painted a full-length portrait of Saldaña's father, the 1st Duke of Lerma. It was acquired by Maria Pia of Savoy in 1885 and was catalogued for many years as being of Sebastian, King of Portugal.
