= Juan de Dios de Silva y Mendoza y Haro, 10th Duke of the Infantado =

Spanish noble

Coat of arms of the House of Mendoza.

Juan de Dios de Silva y Mendoza y Haro (13 November 1672 – 9 December 1737), was a Spanish noble from the House of Mendoza. He was the 10th Duke of the Infantado, the 8th Duke of Lerma and the 6th Duke of Pastrana.

== Biography ==
=== Family origins ===
Juan was the son of Gregorio María de Silva y Mendoza (1649–1693), 9th Duke of the Infantado from whom he inherited the title, and his wife, Doña María de Haro y Guzmán (1644–1693), daughter of Luis Méndez de Haro, the first minister of Philip IV of Spain.

He was a member of the powerful House of Mendoza which had controlled the Dukedom of the Infantado since its inception with Diego Hurtado de Mendoza y Figueroa. The Mendoza family rose to power when it merged with the House of Lasso de la Vega through the marriage of Leonor Lasso de la Vega, the last direct member of that line, and Admiral Diego Hurtado de Mendoza, the admiral of Castile.

=== Political Career ===
The Duke lived at the time of the War of the Spanish Succession between Philip V of Bourbon and Archduke Charles of Austria.

In 1700, he swore allegiance to King Philip V of Bourbon, to whom he served as a gentleman of the bedchamber for a time, and even received him at his palace in Guadalajara: the first time on his arrival in Spain, the second in 1702 when he traveled to Italy, and the third the following year upon his return.

In 1706, however, when the Austrian forces occupied Madrid and forced Philip V to leave the capital, the Duke did not follow his Court, but instead chose to retire to his Alcarria domains. There he welcomed many members of the Mendoza lineage whose support lay with Archduke Charles, but without himself directly participating in the war.

This ambiguity led to his exile to Granada and trial in 1710. Although he was later found innocent, his political career was over and he retired to his estates.

In 1737, the 10th Duke of Infantado died, leaving the estate in the hands of his daughter Maria Francisca, who ruled the ducal house as a widow for 33 years.

=== Marriage and children ===
The Duke married in 1704 María Teresa Gutiérrez de los Ríos Zapata, daughter of Francisco Gutiérrez de los Ríos, 3rd Count of Fernán Núñez. Of the eight children born to the marriage, only three girls survived childhood.

- María Francisca (1707-1770), his successor, had issue
- María Teresa (1708-1757), married the VIII Duke of Arcos, no issue
- Agustina Ramona (died 1744), married the XI Duke of Alburquerque, had issue.

Spanish nobility
Preceded by Gregorio María de Silva y Mendoza	Duke of the Infantado; 1686–1693	Succeeded by María Francisca de Silva y Gutiérrez de los Ríos
