= Gregorio María de Silva y Mendoza, 9th Duke of the Infantado =

Spanish noble

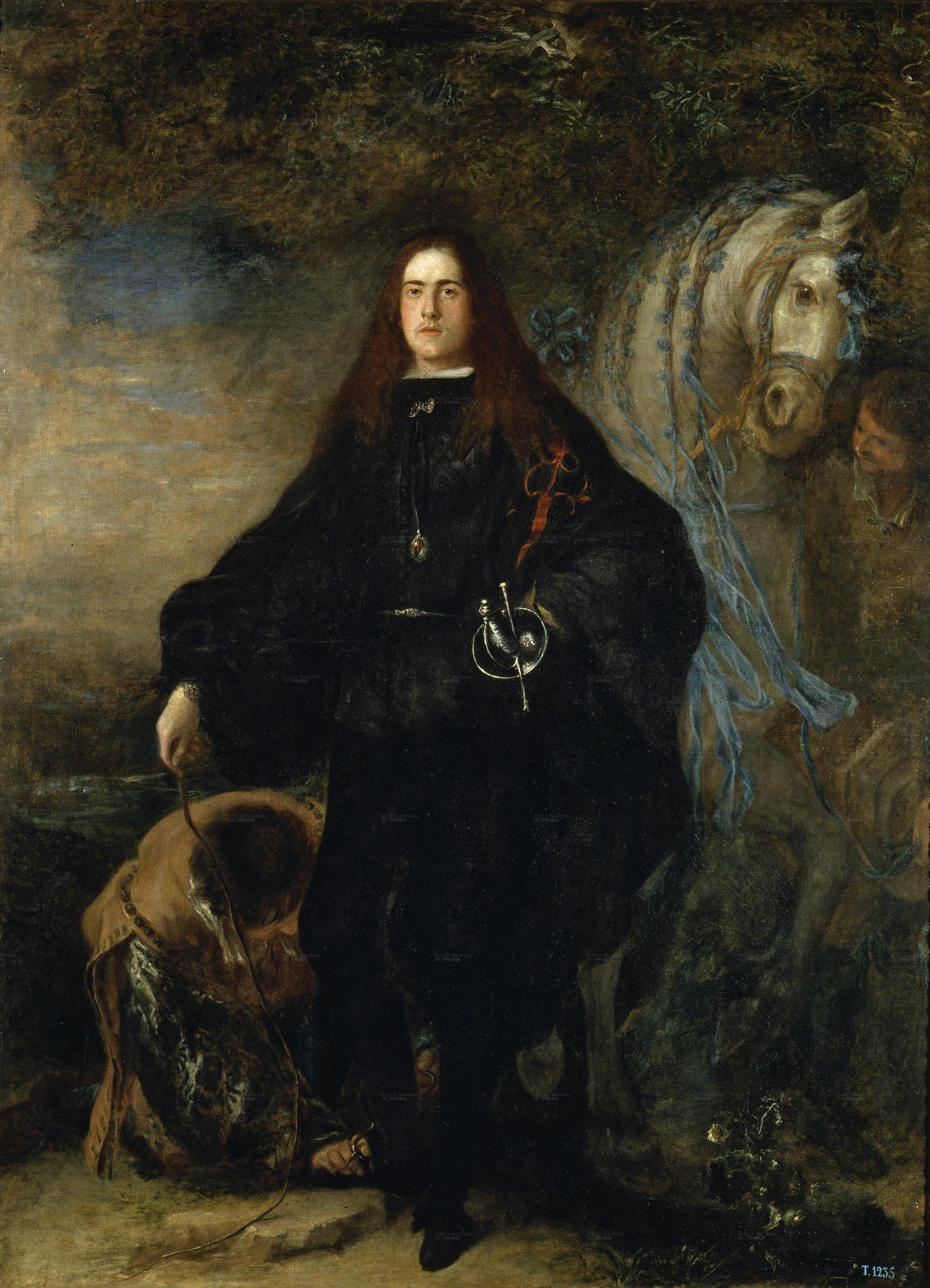
Gregorio María de Silva y Mendoza by Juan Carreño de Miranda (Museo del Prado)

Gregorio de Silva y Mendoza (1649 in Pastrana – 1693 in Madrid) was a Spanish noble from the House of Mendoza. He was the 5th Duke of Pastrana, 9th Duke of the Infantado, 7th Duke of Lerma, 6th Duke of Francavilla, 5th Duke of Estremera, and the Prince of Eboli and Melito.

== Family origins ==
He was the son of Rodrigo de Silva Mendoza y Guzmán, the 4th Duke of Pastrana and his wife, Catalina Gómez de Sandoval y Mendoza, the 8th Duchess of the Infantado. The Mendoza family rose to power when it merged with the House of Lasso de la Vega through the marriage of Leonor Lasso de la Vega, the last direct member of that line, and Admiral Diego Hurtado de Mendoza, the admiral of Castile.

== Biography ==
He inherited his noble titles after the deaths of his mother and father respectively. In 1679, he was sent to Paris with his brothers Gaspar and José to take the newly crowned Queen Marie Louise of Orléans her bridal gifts which consisted of a painting by Juan Carreño de Miranda of Charles II of Spain. The painting's frame was embedded with diamonds. The group left Madrid on 30 July 1679 and arrived in the French Court on 14 September. The ostentatious gift was met with great happiness as is recounted in a contemporary Spanish recording from the day which refers to the Queen, Elisabeth of France's surprise.

"Assi logro el Señor Duque de Pastrana muy cumplidamente el avivar en la corte de Francia la memoria (que siempre vivirá en ella) de su Grande y Generoso Abuelo que fue con el propio carácter, por nuestra inmortal Reyna D.Isabel y se porto con el inimitable lucimiento que ahora su dignissimo Nieto"

The following day, he delivered the present to Mari Louise, an occasion that brought about banquets and parties throughout Paris.

In 1686, following the death of his mother, he became the 9th Duke of the Infantado. This officially united all of the family titles held under one name.

In 1688, he was named Sumiller de Corps of Charles II of Spain, who in 1693, just before his death, named Gregorio as a Knight of the Order of the Golden Fleece where after he took a leading role in the royal court.

He was also an art enthusiast, especially favoring the painter Juan Carreño de Miranda who painted the picture of Queen Marie Louise. Miranda immortalized Gregorio for his patronage in his famous painting which hangs in the Museo del Prado (see right).

== Marriage and descendants ==
In 1666, Gregorio married Doña María de Haro y Guzmán, daughter of Luis Méndez de Haro, the first minister of Philip IV of Spain and Catalina Fernández de Córdoba y Aragón. From this marriage were born:

- Luisa María de Silva y Haro (born 1670), married Manuel Pérez de Guzmán, 12th Duke of Medina Sidonia
- Juan de Dios de Silva y Mendoza y Haro (b. 13 November 1672 - d. 9 December 1773) 10th Duke of the Infantado, 8th Duke of Lerma, 6th Duke of Pastrana, etc.
- Manuel María de Silva Mendoza y Toledo, X conde Galve (1677-1728), married María Teresa Álvarez de Toledo y Haro, XI duchess of Alba de Tormes.
  - Parents of Fernando de Silva, 12th Duke of Alba (1714-1776), Prime Minister of Spain.
- María Teresa de Silva y Méndez de Haro, a nun
- Catalina María de Silva y Méndez de Haro, married Ginés Miguel Fernando Ruíz de Castro y Portugal (1666-1741), XI Count of Lemos.

Spanish nobility
Preceded by Catalina Gómez de Sandoval y Mendoza	Duke of the Infantado; 1686–1693	Succeeded by Juan de Dios de Silva y Mendoza y Haro
