= Diego Hurtado de Mendoza, 3rd Duke of the Infantado =

Spanish noble

Coat of arms of the House of Mendoza.

Diego Hurtado de Mendoza y Luna, 3rd Duke of the Infantado, nicknamed El Grande, (Arenas de San Pedro, Spain, 11 March 1461 – Guadalajara, Castile-La Mancha, Spain, 30 August 1531) was a Spanish noble.

He was born in one of the richest and most influential families of Castile.

He was the son of Íñigo López de Mendoza y Luna, 2nd Duke of the Infantado (* Guadalajara, Castile-La Mancha, 1438 - Guadalajara, Castile-La Mancha, 1500) and the grandson of Diego Hurtado de Mendoza, 1st Duke of the Infantado, (* Guadalajara, Castile-La Mancha, 1415 - Manzanares el Real, 1479). He became 3rd duke in 1500.

He married, first, circa 1491, Maria Pimentel y Pacheco (deceased 1499), daughter of Rodrigo Afonso Pimentel, 4th count and 1st duke of Benavente.

They had 4 children :

- Íñigo López de Mendoza, 4th Duke of the Infantado, (1493–1566).
- Rodrigo de Mendoza, 1st marquis of Montes-Claros.
- Ana, married Luis de la Cerda, 1st marquis of Cogolludo.
- Marina, married Diego Arias.

He remarried in 1530 with Maria Maldonado, no issue.

He participated in the conquest of Granada, distinguishing himself in the conquest of Loja.

He was a strong political opponent of Cardinal Cisneros and defended the rights of the nobles.

In 1519, he became a Knight of the Order of the Golden Fleece on proposal of King Charles I of Spain, a.k.a. Charles V, Holy Roman Emperor.

During the Revolt of the Comuneros in 1520 and 1521, the duke of Infantado played a cautious waiting game to see which side would win. In 1521 he chose to support King Charles I, mostly because of his hate towards Bishop Acuña.

King Francis I of France stayed in his palace, after the King had been taken prisoner in the Battle of Pavia in 1525.

In his old age, the Duke suffered from gout and led a pious life.

The Catalan composer Mateo Flecha was in his service from 1525 until his death.

Preceded by Íñigo López de Mendoza y Luna	Duke of the Infantado; 1500–1531	Succeeded by Íñigo López de Mendoza y Pimentel
