= María Francisca de Silva y Gutiérrez de los Ríos, 11th Duchess of the Infantado =

Spanish noblewoman

Coat of arms of the House of Mendoza.

María Francisca de Silva-Mendoza-Sandoval y Gutiérrez de los Ríos (b. 1707 Granada - d. 1770) was a Spanish noblewoman of the House of Mendoza and the last Mendoza to hold title over the Dukedom of the Infantado. She was the 11th Duchess of the Infantado and also held the associated titles of Duchess of Lerma and of Pastrana (IX Duquesa de Lerma y IX Marqués de Távara).

== Family origins ==
As a member of the Mendoza family, Maria was next in line to receive the Dukedom of the Infantado and its associated titles. The dukedom had been in the hands of the Mendoza family since the very first duke, Diego Hurtado de Mendoza y Figueroa. The Mendoza family rose to power when it merged with the House of Lasso de la Vega through the marriage of Leonor Lasso de la Vega, the last direct member of that line, and Admiral Diego Hurtado de Mendoza, the admiral of Castile. María was the last of the direct Mendoza family line to hold the title.

Her father was Juan de Dios de Silva y Mendoza y Haro, the X Duke of the Infantado. Her mother was María Teresa de los Ríos.

== Biography ==
Privately, Maria ran her house according to the old Habsburg spirit but her tenure in office saw many changes in Spain with the rise of the Age of Enlightenment in the 18th century. She was forced to face many counter claims and lawsuits to the hereditary family property of her Dukedom.

=== Marriage and descendants ===
On 10 January 1724, María Francisca de Silva Mendoza Gutiérrez de los Ríos married Miguel de Toledo y Pimentel, the IX Marqués de Távara. Toledo y Pimentel would die in 1734, but the couple gave birth to one child:

- Pedro de Alcántara Álvarez de Toledo y Silva - Who would go on to become the XII Duke of the Infantado

== See also ==
- House of Mendoza
- Duke of the Infantado

Spanish nobility
Preceded by Juan de Dios de Silva y Mendoza y Haro	Duchess of the Infantado; 1737–1770	Succeeded by Pedro de Alcántara Álvarez de Toledo y Silva
