= Duke of Lerma (title) =

Hereditary title in the Peerage of Spain

Dukedom of Lerma
- Creation date: 11 November 1599
- Created by: Philip III
- Peerage: Peerage of Spain
- First holder: Francisco Gómez de Sandoval y Rojas, 1st Duke of Lerma
- Present holder: Fernando Larios y Fernández de Córdoba, 16th Duke of Lerma

Duke of Lerma (Spanish: Duque de Lerma) is a hereditary title in the Peerage of Spain accompanied by the dignity of Grandee, granted in 1599 by Philip III to Francisco Gómez de Sandoval, 4th Count of Lerma and his royal favourite.

== Dukes of Lerma (1599) ==
- Francisco Gómez de Sandoval y Rojas, 1st Duke of Lerma (1599-1625)
- Francisco Gómez de Sandoval y Rojas, 2nd Duke of Lerma (1625-1635)
- Mariana Isabel Gómez de Sandoval y Rojas, 3rd Duchess of Lerma (1635-1651)
- Ambrosio de Aragón y Gómez de Sandoval, 4th Duke of Lerma (1651-1659)
- Diego Gómez de Sandoval y Rojas, 5th Duke of Lerma (1660-1668)
- Catalina Gómez de Sandoval y Mendoza, 6th Duchess of Lerma (1668-1686)
- Gregorio María de Silva y Mendoza, 7th Duke of Lerma (1686-1693)
- Juan de Dios de Silva y Mendoza, 8th Duke of Lerma (1693-1737)
- María Francisca de Silva y Gutiérrez de los Ríos, 9th Duchess of Lerma (1737-1770)
- Pedro de Alcántara Álvarez de Toledo y Silva, 10th Duke of Lerma (1770-1790)
- Pedro de Alcántara Álvarez de Toledo y Salm-Salm, 11th Duke of Lerma (1790-1841)
- Pedro de Alcántara Téllez-Girón y Beaufort Spontin, 12th Duke of Lerma (1841-1844)
- Mariano Téllez-Girón y Beaufort Spontin, 13th Duke of Lerma (1844-1882)
- Fernando Fernández de Córdoba y Pérez de Barradas, 14th Duke of Lerma (1887-1936)
- María de la Paz Fernández de Córdoba y Fernández de Henestrosa, 15th Duchess of Lerma (1952-1998)
- Fernando Larios y Fernández de Córdoba, 16th Duke of Lerma (2000-)

== See also ==
- List of dukes in the peerage of Spain
- List of current grandees of Spain
