= Rodrigo Díaz de Vivar Mendoza y Sandoval, 7th Duke of the Infantado =

Spanish noble

Coat of arms of the House of Mendoza

Rodrigo Díaz de Vivar Mendoza y Sandoval, 7th Duke of the Infantado (4 April 1614 – 14 January 1657) was a Spanish noble of the House of Mendoza and the 7th Duke of the Infantado. He was Viceroy of Sicily from 1651 to 1655.

== Family ==
Rodrigo de Mendoza was the son of Diego Gómez de Sandoval y Rojas, count consort of Saldaña through his marriage to Luisa de Mendoza, daughter of Ana de Mendoza y Enríquez de Cabrera, 6th Duchess of the Infantado. Although the title of Pastrana should have gone to Rodrigo de Mendoza on the death of his mother, in 1619, his father continued using it until his death, while his son used the title Count of the Cid.

In 1627, at the age of thirteen he was betrothed to Isabel Mendoza de Luna, daughter of the 3rd Marquis of Montesclaros, who had been the Viceroy of New Spain and of Peru. However, she died in 1629, before the consummation of the marriage. In 1630, he married María de Silva, the daughter of Ruy III Gómez de Silva y Mendoza de la Cerda, the 3rd Duke of Pastrana.

He became 7th Duke of the Infantado, when his grandmother died in 1633, his mother having died several years earlier.

When Rodrigo de Mendoza died in 1657, without leaving any heirs, the title passed on to his sister, Catalina Gómez de Sandoval y Mendoza, the Duchess of Pastrana, thereby uniting the two houses, Infantado and Pastrana, and increasing the power of the family.

== Biography ==
As Duke of the Infantado, he fought in the Portuguese Restoration War (1640–1668) as a member of Philip IV of Spain's staff. He also participated in the Catalan Revolt (1640–1659) and at the Siege of Lérida. He was later appointed the Spanish ambassador to Rome (1649-1951) and Viceroy of Sicily (1651-1655).

Government offices
Preceded by John of Austria the Younger	Viceroy of Sicily; 1651–1655	Succeeded by Juan Téllez-Girón
Spanish nobility
Preceded by Ana de Mendoza y Enríquez de Cabrera	Duke of the Infantado; 1633–1657	Succeeded by Catalina Gómez de Sandoval y Mendoza
