= Duke of Estremera =

Title in the Peerage of Spain

Dukedom of Estremera
- Creation date: 1568
- Created by: Philip II
- Peerage: Peerage of Spain
- First holder: Ruy Gómez de Silva, 1st Duke of Estremera
- Present holder: María de la Asunción de Bustos y Marín, 4th Duchess of Estremera
- Former seat: Palace of Pastrana

Duke of Estremera (Spanish: Duque de Estremera) is a hereditary title in the Peerage of Spain, accompanied by the dignity of Grandee and granted in 1538 by Philip II to Ruy Gómez de Silva, 1st Prince of Éboli.

Originally, the titles of Estremera and Pastrana were one and the same title, however, the Dukes of Estremera, later Dukes of Pastrana, made themselves known by the two titles, suggesting that they were two different titles.

All the descendants of the 1st Duke of Pastrana, up to the 11th duke, styled themselves with both the titles of Dukes of Pastrana and Estremera, as if they were two different dukedoms, until the death of the 11th duke, without descendants. The Crown distributed the very numerous titles that had been concentrated in his person (thirteen dukedoms, twelve marquessates, thirteen countships and one viscountcy) among his relatives, "forgetting" to grant the Dukedom of Estremera, since it did not exist legally as it was originally replaced by the Dukedom of Pastrana.

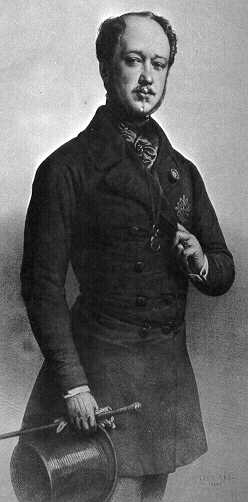
The 11th Duke of Pastrana was also known as the Duke of Estremera, although it had been held unofficially by his ancestors up until the 1st duke

It was in 1913, when one of his descendants, Iván de Bustos y Ruiz de Arana, requested the rehabilitation of Estremera, which was accepted and rehabilitated to him as second holder, ignoring that previously there had been eleven Dukes of Pastrana who had also named themselves Dukes of Estremera, and thus confirming that only the first Duke of Estremera had been legally so.

The title makes reference to the town of Estremera in Madrid.

== Dukes of Estremera ==
=== Official list ===
- Ruy Gómez de Silva, 1st Duke of Estremera
- Iván de Bustos y Ruiz de Arana, 2nd Duke of Estremera
- Iván de Bustos y Téllez-Girón, 3rd Duke of Estremera
- María de la Asunción de Bustos y Marín, 4th Duchess of Estremera

=== Unofficial list ===
- Ruy Gómez de Silva, 1st Duke of Estremera
- Ruy Gómez de Silva y Mendoza, 2nd Duke of Estremera
- Ruy Gómez de Silva y de la Cerda, 3rd Duke of Estremera
- Rodrigo Díaz de Vivar y De Silva, 4th Duke of Estremera
- Gregorio María de Silva y Mendoza, 5th Duke of Estremera
- Juan de Dios de Silva y Haro, 6th Duke of Estremera
- María Teresa de Silva y Gutiérrez de los Ríos, 7th Duchess of Estremera
- Pedro de Alcántara Álvarez de Toledo y Silva, 8th Duke of Estremera
- Pedro de Alcántara Álvarez de Toledo y Salm-Salm, 9th Duke of Estremera
- Pedro de Alcántara Téllez-Girón y Beaufort Spontin, 10th Duke of Estremera
- Mariano Téllez-Girón y Beaufort Spontin, 11th Duke of Estremera
- Iván de Bustos y Ruiz de Arana, 12th Duke of Estremera
- Iván de Bustos y Téllez-Girón, 13th Duke of Estremera
- María de la Asunción de Bustos y Marín, 14th Duchess of Estremera

== See also ==
- List of dukes in the peerage of Spain
- List of current grandees of Spain
