= Íñigo López =

Íñigo López may refer to:

- the birth name of Ignatius of Loyola, founder of the Jesuits
- Íñigo López, Lord of Biscay, the first known Lord of Biscay
- Íñigo López de Mendoza, marqués de Santillan, Spanish poet
- Íñigo López de Mendoza y Luna, 2nd Duke of the Infantado, Spanish nobleman
- Íñigo López de Mendoza y Zúñiga, Spanish diplomat and ecclesiastic
- Íñigo López de Mendoza, 4th Duke of the Infantado, Spanish nobleman
- Íñigo López Montaña, Spanish footballer
