= Íñigo López de Mendoza y Mendoza, 5th Duke of the Infantado =

Spanish noble (1536-1601)

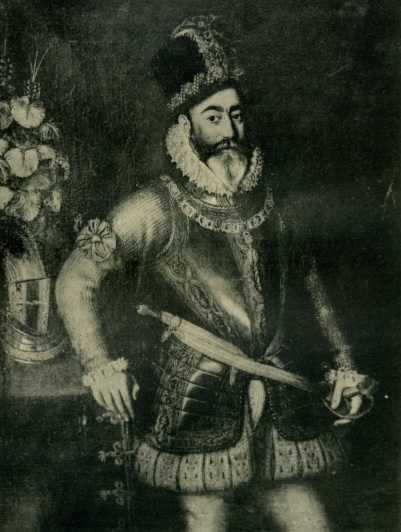
Portrait, c. 1594

Íñigo López de Mendoza y Mendoza (b. 1536 - d. 1601) was the 5th Duke of the Infantado from 1566 until his death in 1601.

He was the son of Diego Hurtado de Mendoza y Aragón, who predeceased his father Íñigo López de Mendoza, 4th Duke of the Infantado.

== Biography ==
A favorite of Philip II of Spain, Íñigo accompanied the king to England for his marriage with Mary Tudor in 1556. As a big patron of the arts, and due to his perpetual, but friendly, competition with the king, Íñigo boasted that his palace was every bit as splendid as El Escorial, hiring some of the same painters to paint its walls and ceilings. The remodeling of the palace was carried out by Acacio de Orejón on the orders of Íñigo.

Íñigo later hosted the king's marriage to Elisabeth of Valois at his palace in Guadalajara in 1560.

== Military collection ==
=== Swords and armour ===
The 5th Duke of Infantado amassed an expansive collection of arms and armour, including at least fifty-three Milanese suits of armor, Moorish and antique swords, and elaborately inscribed crossbows. His sword collection featured gold-engraved Arabic inscriptions and markings such as Recaredus Gothoçun, 1544, and SPQR. The crossbows bore religious phrases, ownership marks, and manufacturer signatures.

=== Firearms ===
The Duke’s firearms were equally remarkable, including harquebuses from Rodrigo de Mendoza and Enrique de Mendoza’s auction, German and Biscayan pieces, and forty-six muskets crafted by armorer Mateo Barnaechea. His pistol collection featured a set from the Duke of Pastrana, marked del duque don Diego de Silva y Mendoza (dated 1584), and Italian firearms gifted by Charles Emmanuel, Duke of Savoy. Many were ornately decorated with gold, damascening, and marquetry.

=== Morions and rodelas ===
His collection also included Milanese morions, some gilded and engraved, with pieces gifted by Royal Secretary Antonio Pérez and Luis de Toledo. The rodelas (round shields) were highly ornate, featuring gold escutcheons, relief designs, and materials such as tortoise shell carved by Indigenous Americans, and an "elephant’s ear" with the Guzmán family’s arms.

=== Gangway from Lepanto ===
Additionally, historian Esteban de Garibay recorded that the Duke owned the central gangway from the Turkish flagship at the Battle of Lepanto, a gift from Juan of Austria. The Duke personally showed this relic to Garibay in 1577.

== Descendants ==
In 1552 he married Luisa Enriquez de Cabrera, and together they had 3 daughters.

He married his eldest daughter and successor, Ana de Mendoza y Enríquez de Cabrera (1554-1633) with his brother, Rodrigo de Mendoza so as to avoid problems over succession of the Dukedom.

His two other daughters

- Isabel (died 1593) married Lorenzo Suárez de Figueroa, 2nd Duke of Feria (1559 - 1607)
- Mencía (died 1619) married Antonio Álvarez de Toledo, 5th Duke of Alba (1568 - 1639)

Preceded by Íñigo López de Mendoza y Pimentel	Duke of the Infantado; 1566–1601	Succeeded by Ana de Mendoza y Enríquez de Cabrera
