= Iñigo López de Mendoza y Mendoza =

Spanish noble, diplomat and politician

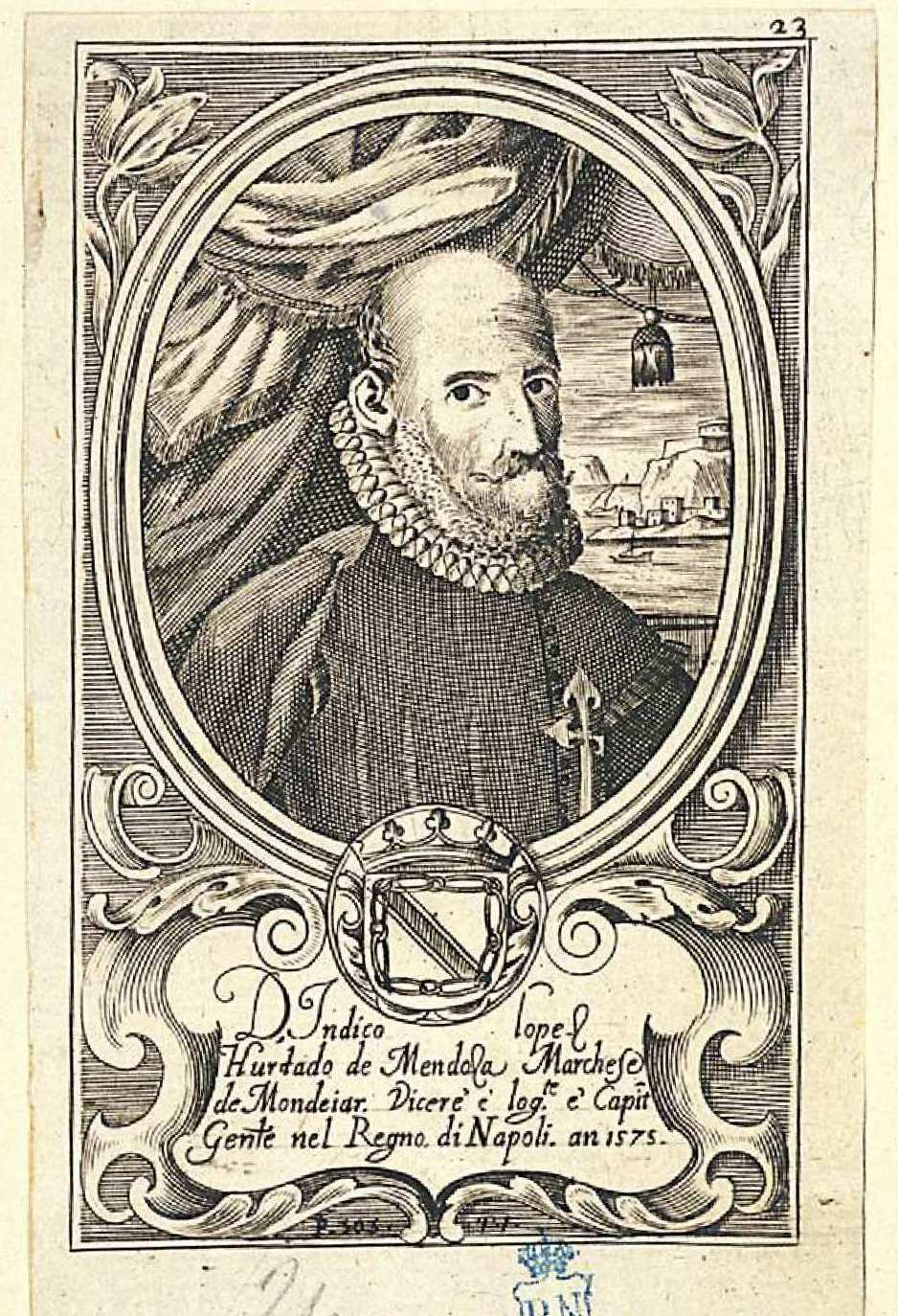
Íñigo López de Mendoza y Mendoza

Íñigo López de Mendoza y Mendoza (1512 – 21 April 1580 in Mondéjar) was a Spanish noble, military, diplomat and politician in the service of King Philip II of Spain. He was the 4th Count of Tendilla (Spanish: Conde de Tendilla) and 3rd Marquis of Mondejar (Marqués de Mondéjar).

== Life ==
From his father Luis Hurtado de Mendoza y Pacheco, Íñigo López de Mendoza y Mendoza inherited the titles of count of Tendilla and marquis of Mondejar. He became also 3rd and last Captain General of Granada. His mother was Catalina de Mendoza, daughter of the Count of Monteagudo. Íñigo married María de Mendoza, daughter of the very influential Íñigo López de Mendoza, 4th Duke of the Infantado.

In 1555, he became commander of the Spanish land and sea in the relief of the Turkish siege of Oran and Bugía. In 1560, he was Spanish Ambassador in Rome. He led the Spanish troops during the early stages of the Morisco Revolt together with Luis Fajardo, 2nd Marquis of los Vélez. The American historian Henry Charles Lea wrote of Mondéjar's "short but brilliant campaign... Through heavy snows and intense cold and over almost inaccessible mountains he fought battle after battle, giving the enemy no respite and following up every advantage gained. The Moriscos speedily lost heart and sought terms of surrender… By the middle of February [1569] the rebellion was practically suppressed." Despite these successes, Mondejar was replaced in 1570 by Juan de Austria. After the suppression of the rebellion, he became viceroy of Valencia in 1572, and Viceroy of Naples in 1575.

== Family ==
He had 9 sons and two daughters, amongst whom

- Luis Hurtado de Mendoza y Mendoza (1543–1604), his successor.
- Francisco López de Mendoza y Mendoza, (1547-1623), Admiral of Aragon
- Juan Hurtado de Mendoza y Mendoza (1555–1624), married Ana de Mendoza y Enríquez de Cabrera, 6th Duchess of the Infantado
- Elvira (1565), married Pedro Álvarez de Toledo, 5th Marquis of Villafranca.
