= Juan Hurtado de Mendoza y Mendoza =

Spanish noble (1555-1624)

Juan Hurtado de Mendoza y Mendoza (1555-1624), son of Íñigo López de Mendoza y Mendoza, 3rd Marques of Mondéjar, was the Mayordomo Mayor of Philip III of Spain and Philip IV of Spain and in virtue of his marriage with Ana de Mendoza y Enríquez de Cabrera head of the House of Mendoza from 1594 until his death in 1624.

An important work of Second scholasticism, Pedro Hurtado de Mendoza's Universa Philosophia (Lyons: Prost, 1624) was dedicated to him.
