= New Castle of Manzanares el Real =

Cultural property in Manzanares el Real

Coordinates: 40°43′38″N 3°51′44″W

- Castillo nuevo de Manzanares el Real (Spanish)
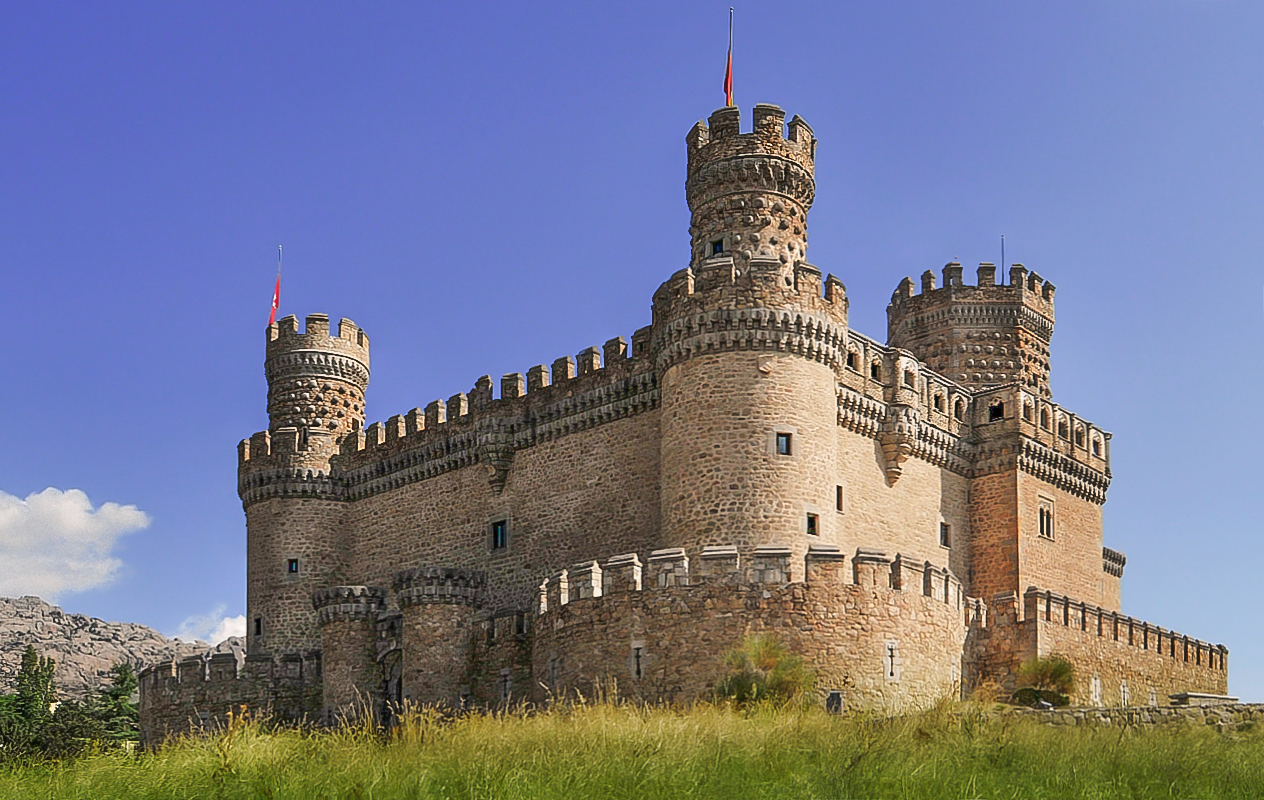

- Location within Spain
- Location: Manzanares el Real, Spain

Spanish Cultural Heritage
- Official name: Castillo nuevo de Manzanares el Real
- Type: Non-movable
- Criteria: Monument
- Designated: 1931
- Reference no.: RI-51-0000720

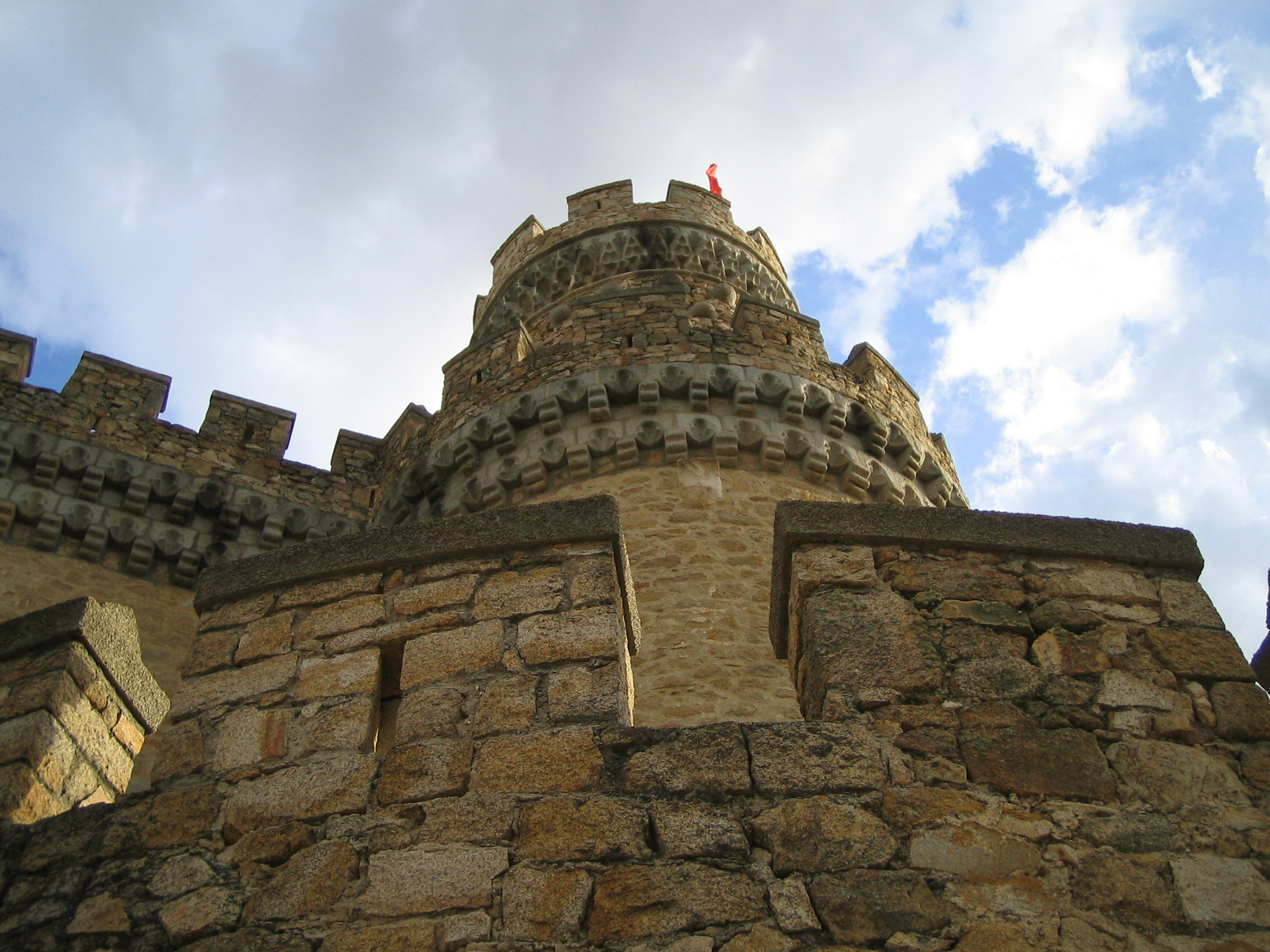
Detail of one of the towers.

The New Castle of Manzanares el Real, also known as Castle of los Mendoza, is a palace-fortress erected in the 15th century in the town of Manzanares el Real (Community of Madrid, Spain), next to the Santillana reservoir at the foot of Sierra de Guadarrama mountain range.

Its construction began in 1475 on a Romanesque-Mudéjar hermitage. It was raised on the river Manzanares, as a residential palace of the House of Mendoza, in the vicinity of an ancient fortress that was abandoned once the new castle was built.

The castle now houses a museum of Spanish castles and hosts a collection of tapestries.

== Conservation ==
It was declared a Monumento Histórico-Artístico in 1931 and today is one of the best preserved castles of the Community of Madrid.

== History ==
The lands bordering the upper reaches of the River Manzanares, rich in pastures and forests, were the subject of frequent disputes between different powers that emerged after the Reconquista. The communities of Villa y Tierra de Segovia and Madrid had several disputes over the 13th century, which were resolved in the 14th century by King John I of Castile with the donation of the comarca to his steward, Pedro Gonzalez de Mendoza.

The eldest Mendoza son, Diego Hurtado de Mendoza, Admiral of Castile, is credited with building the first fortress, now known as the Old Castle of Manzanares el Real, although it is likely that this building had an earlier origin. In the last third of the 15th century, the House of Mendoza decided to build a new castle-palace, larger and more luxurious, in accordance with the remarkable economic and political influence achieved by this family.

Work began in 1475. Diego Hurtado de Mendoza, 1st Duke of the Infantado, did not live long enough to see the castle completed. It was his eldest son, Íñigo López de Mendoza, who finished construction under the direction of the architect Juan Guas, author of Palace of the Infantado, of Guadalajara.

The role of the castle as a palatial residence lasted only a century. With the death in 1566 of Íñigo López de Mendoza y Pimentel, 4th Duke of the Infantado, the castle ceased to be inhabited, as economic problems and disputes arose between the heirs of the House of Mendoza.

The castle was one of the locations used in the movie El Cid (1961).

In 1982, the castle hosted the act of establishment of the Parliamentary Assembly of Madrid, during which the region's Statute of Autonomy was also presented.

== Features ==
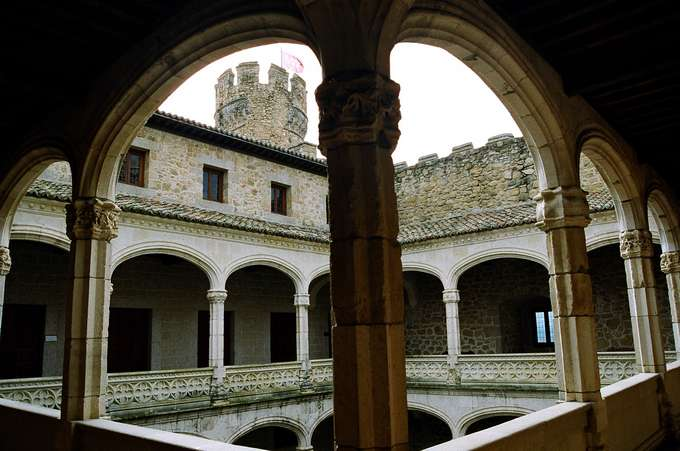
Arcaded inner courtyard inside the New Castle of Manzanares el Real.

The castle, quadrangular, is constructed entirely of granite stone. It has four circular towers. Its vertices are decorated with balls in the Isabelline Gothic style. The main hexagonal tower is one of the highlights.

The building is topped by a terrace with machicolation and turrets. It includes a rectangular courtyard with porticos and two galleries supported by octagonal columns. The Gothic gallery on the first floor is considered the most beautiful in Spanish military architecture. On the southern chemin de ronde the gallery is flaming trace on parapets decorated with diamond shapes.

The whole castle is surrounded by a barbican, which includes loopholes and, carved in low relief, the cross of the Holy Sepulchre of Jerusalem, a title held by Pedro Gonzalez de Mendoza. Other defensive elements of the building includes its pockets.

The castle has six floors, plus a basement: ground floor, mezzanine first, main floor, mezzanine second, upper gallery and gallery of covers. The main gate is flanked by two towers with an arch between them.

== Access ==
It is owned by the Duchy of the Infantado, but it has been rented to the Community of Madrid, which has managed the site as a tourist attraction.
