= Almudena de Arteaga, 20th Duchess of the Infantado =

Spanish writer

- 20th Duchess of the Infantado, 21st Countess of Real de Manzanares
- Predecessor: Íñigo de Arteaga y Martín, 20th Duke of the Infantado
- Born: 25 June 1967 (age 59); Madrid, Spain
- Noble family: House of the Infantado
- Spouse: José Ramón Fernández de Mesa y Temboury
- Father: Íñigo de Arteaga y Martín
- Mother: Almudena del Alcázar y Armada
- Occupation: Writer
- Website: almudenaarteaga.com

María de la Almudena de Arteaga y del Alcázar, 20th Duchess of the Infantado GE (born in Madrid on 25 June 1967), is a Spanish writer in the genre of the historical novel.

== Biography ==
She was born in Madrid on 25 June 1967, the city where she currently resides with her husband and two daughters. She has a degree in law from the Complutense University of Madrid and a diploma in Genealogy, Heraldry and Nobility from the Salazar y Castro Institute.

She practiced law for six years, specializing in Civil and Labor Law. She worked as a documentary filmmaker on the books La insigne Orden del Toisón de Oro and La Orden Real de España, a historical essay. In 1997 she published her first novel La Princesa de Éboli. After the success obtained, she left the practice of Law to dedicate herself exclusively to literature. Twenty works of different genres followed this first novel.

Recognized by critics as one of the most outstanding current historical novel writers, her books have reached the bestseller lists for more than four months, with numerous reissues and have been translated into several languages. Premio de Novela Histórica Alfonso X El Sabio 2004 (Alfonso X El Sabio Historical Novel Award) 2004 with María de Molina. Tres coronas medievales. In March 2012, she was awarded the 19th Premio Azorín de Novela (Azorín Prize for Best Novel) for her work Capricho, a historical tour with intrigue through 19th century Madrid.

Currently she continues to write, lecture in literary and historical forums and collaborate as a columnist in national newspapers and magazines.

On 25 September 2024, Le Monde reported that she had won a court case to regain control of a park enjoyed by the local population in Duque de Infantado park, in Manzanares el Real, Spain. The park had been deeded by her grandfather to the municipality in 1975, the year of the death of the dictator Francisco Franco, in a bid to win the sympathy of local residents.

== House of the Infantado ==
Following the approval of Law 33/2006, of 30 October, on the equality of men and women in the order of succession, Almudena, as the first-born daughter, became the main heir to the House of the Infantado, displacing her brother Íñigo, 20th Marquis of Tavara, who until a few years ago, as the first-born among men, was called to be the 20th Duke of the Infantado, and who died in 2012 in a plane crash, and his brother Iván, 16th Marquis of Armunia.

On 17 November 2018, the succession in favor of the Duchy of the Infantado, as well as five other titles of nobility and dignities, was published in the Official State Gazette.

== Controversy ==
In September 2024, Almudena seized a piece of land near the Manzanares Castle, previously ceded by her grandfather for the use and enjoyment of the town, effectively depriving the population of a playground for children.

Later, in January 2025, she took back management of the Castle, closing it to the public.

== Nobility titles ==
Titles of the House of the Infantado

- 20th Duchess of Infantado
- 21st Marchioness of Santillana
- 18th Duchess of Cea
- 21st Countess of Real de Manzanares
- 22nd Countess of Saldaña
- 14th Countess of Monclova
- 8th Countess of Corres
- 25th Lady of the House of Lazcano
- 24th Admiral of Aragon
