= Catalina Gómez de Sandoval y Mendoza, 8th Duchess of the Infantado =

Coat of arms of the House of Mendoza.

Catalina Gómez de Sandoval y Mendoza (1616–1686) was the 8th Duchess of the Infantado, gaining the title after the death of her brother in 1657. She held the title until her own death in 1686. She also served in various important palace roles at the court of Charles II of Spain. She was also the Duchess Consort of Pastrana.

== Family Origins ==
As a member of the prestigious Mendoza family, Catalina was next in line to receive the Dukedom of the Infantado after the death of her brother, Rodrigo Díaz de Vivar Gómez de Sandoval y Mendoza, the 7th Duke who was childless. The Dukedom had been in the hands of the Mendoza family since the very first duke, Diego Hurtado de Mendoza y Figueroa. The Mendoza family rose to power when it merged with the House of Lasso de la Vega through the marriage of Leonor Lasso de la Vega, the last direct member of that line, and Admiral Diego Hurtado de Mendoza, the admiral of Castile.

== Biography ==
Catalina preferred to live in Pastrana with her husband rather than Guadalajara, the traditional seat of the Dukes of the Infantado.

She filed suit for the Dukedom of Lerma against Diego Gómez de Sandoval, the Conde de Saldaña, the only nephew of the first Duke of Lerma and son of Catalina's father. Of issue was that Diego had remarried. in 1659 at the house of the Duke of Alba, it was announced that the 5th Duke of Lerma would be Diego Gómez de Sandoval, but as he had no line of succession for lack of heirs, the Dukedom would pass, upon his death, to his sister Catalina.

In 1668, Diego Gómez de Sandoval died and Catalina Gómez de Sandoval y Mendoza who was already the Duchess of the Infantado and of Pastrana, gained the Dukedom of Lerma as well. The Duke of Medinaceli continued to fight against this decision until 1677 when all matters were settled in favor of Catalina.

In addition to amassing hereditary titles, Catalina also built the Convento de los Capuchinos de Jadraque, Donated much to the Carmelites of Guadalajara (Where her daughter Leonor became a member), and bought a house for the Dukes of the Infantado in Chamartín de la Rosa, Madrid where in 1808, Napoleon Bonaparte would stay when his troops occupied the city.

== Marriage ==
In 1630, Catalina married Rodrigo Díaz de Vivar de Silva y Mendoza, the fourth Duke of Pastrana. This made her the Duchess Consort of Pastrana and united both dukedoms under one house. They had the following children:

- Gregorio María de Silva y Mendoza, 9th Duke of the Infantado, inherited from his mother.
- Leonor de Silva y Mendoza, joined the Carmelites of Guadalajara.
- José de Silva y Mendoza
- Gaspar de Silva y Mendoza

Spanish nobility
Preceded by Rodrigo Díaz de Vivar Gómez de Sandoval y Mendoza	Duke of the Infantado; 1657–1686	Succeeded by Gregorio María de Silva y Mendoza
