= Eugenia Rico =

Spanish novelist and screenwriter

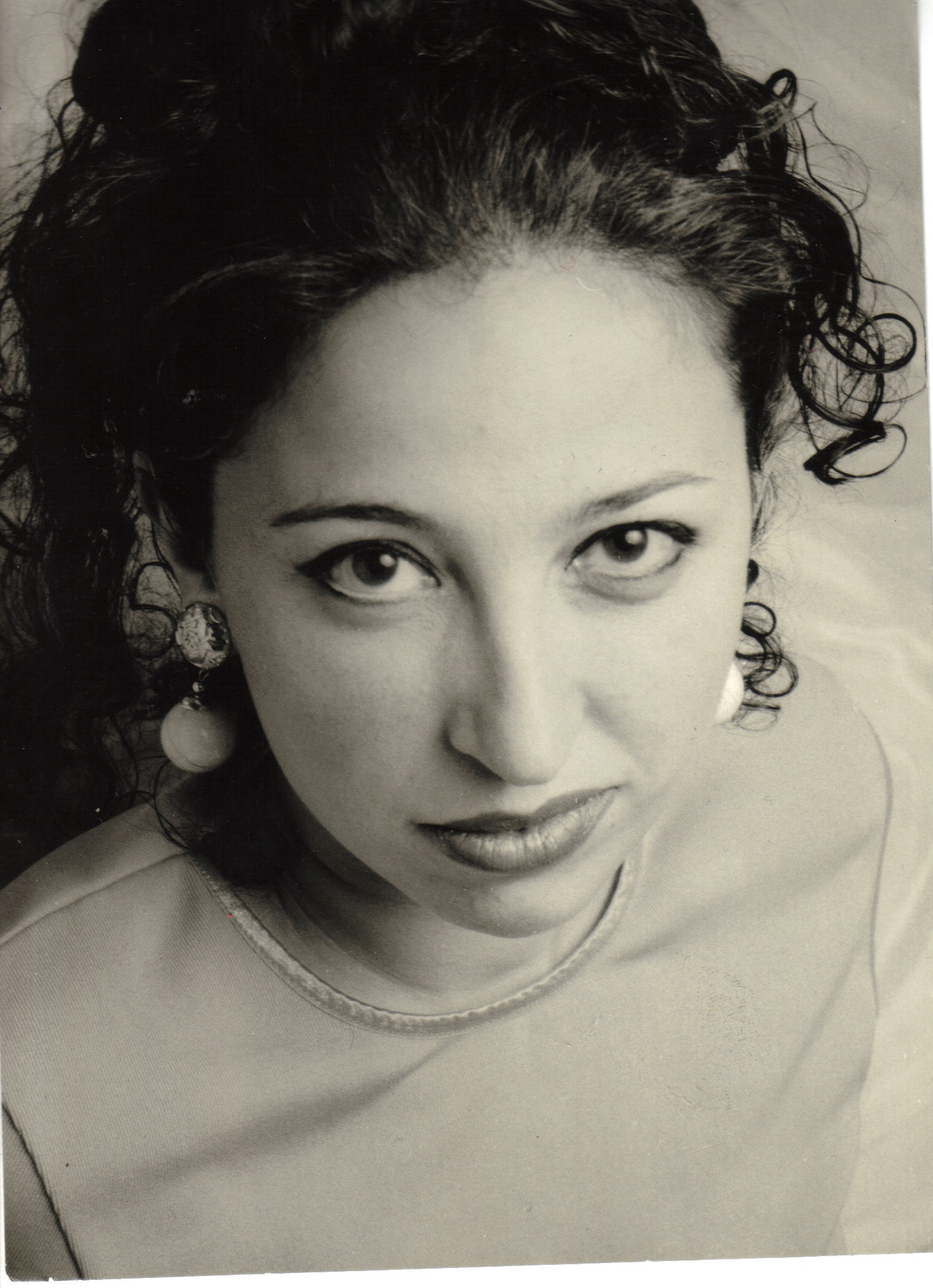
Eugenia Rico

Eugenia Rico (born February 11, 1972, Oviedo, Asturias) is a Spanish novelist, screenwriter and journalist. She is one of the most internationally translated Spanish writers of her generation, with novels published in over twelve languages across Europe and Latin America. Her 2008 novel Aunque seamos malditas has been widely acclaimed by international critics as a pioneering work of existential feminism, recognized for anticipating themes of the "Me Too" movement and being adopted into major academic curricula, including at Georgetown University.

== Early life and education ==
Rico was born in Oviedo, Asturias, into a working-class family. She studied Law and International Relations in Oviedo, Toulouse and Brussels, and also studied screenwriting and dramatic arts. She published her first story at the age of eleven in the Diario Región and later founded the literary magazine Multiversidad at the University of Oviedo.

She was selected as Writer in Residence at the International Writing Program at the University of Iowa, becoming the first Spanish novelist to hold this position.

== Writing career ==
Rico's debut novel Los amantes tristes (2000) received unanimous critical acclaim and was translated into multiple languages. Her second novel La muerte blanca (2002) won the Premio Azorín and was described by El País as "like Canetti and Octavio Paz, Eugenia Rico has written a book against death." La edad secreta (2004) was a finalist for the Premio Primavera de Novela. El otoño alemán (2006) won the Premio Ateneo de Sevilla.

Her novel Aunque seamos malditas (2008) sold over one million copies worldwide. It was published in Germany by Hoffmann und Campe, one of Germany's oldest and most prestigious literary publishers. German author Daniel Kehlmann described Rico as "the most important voice in contemporary literature in Spanish."

La morte bianca, the Italian edition of La muerte blanca, was reviewed by la Repubblica's literary supplement Robinson, Corriere della Sera's cultural supplement La Lettura, and Le Monde diplomatique.

Her short story Waste, translated by Anna Rosen Guercio, was a finalist for the Pushcart Prize and published in the California literary journal Eleven Eleven.

In 2018 Rico won the Premio Bauer at the Incroci di Civiltà international literature festival in Venice, organised by the Università Ca' Foscari, alongside Ian McEwan. She was the first Spanish writer to receive this recognition.

Her novel Tuve que matar a papá (I Had to Kill Daddy), set in Venice and ten years in the making, was completed in 2026 and is forthcoming in English translation.

== Literary style and themes ==
Rico's work is characterised by fragmentary narrative structures, autofiction, and an unflinching exploration of female experience, grief, desire and memory. She is considered a pioneer of autofiction and fragmentary literature in Spain, having developed these techniques two decades before they became dominant in contemporary Spanish letters.

Her writing has been compared to that of Han Kang for its combination of poetic intensity, formal innovation and capacity to transform personal trauma into universal narrative. Her Italian editor Loretta Santini of Elliot Edizioni has described her as "the Spanish Han Kang."

Rico is the originator of the literary movement known as Magical Existentialism, which combines the interior landscape of existentialist fiction with the symbolic richness of magical realism. Her novels consistently foreground women's voices, bodies and histories, placing her work in dialogue with the broader international conversation about feminist literature. In her 2008 novel Aunque seamos malditas, Rico expands her exploration of historical marginalization through a distinct lens of existential feminism. The narrative functions as a collection of modern parables of power, challenging patriarchal structures and institutional guilt. Because of its fierce denunciation of workplace harassment, mobbing, and systematic violence against women, contemporary literary reception frequently identifies the novel as the "Me Too literature before Me Too" within the Spanish-speaking world. Due to its formal innovation, the work has been integrated into the academic curricula of major American institutions, including serving as required reading at Georgetown University. This international acclaim aligns with broader critical consensus; Daniel Kehlmann declared Rico "the most important voice in contemporary literature in Spanish," while El País heralded the novel as “the best novel written by a Spanish writer this century.”

== Awards and recognition ==
Rico won the Premio Azorín (2002) and the Premio Ateneo de Sevilla (2006). Her body of work received the Valle-Inclán Fellowship at the Real Academia de España in Rome.

Rico received the Orden Alejo Zuloaga Eguzquiza from the Universidad de Carabobo, Venezuela, at the opening gala of the Feria Internacional del Libro de la Universidad de Carabobo (FILUC) in 2025, where she also delivered the inaugural lecture.

== Bibliography ==
- Los amantes tristes (2000)
- La muerte blanca (2002) — Premio Azorín
- La edad secreta (2004)
- El otoño alemán (2006) — Premio Ateneo de Sevilla
- Aunque seamos malditas (2008)
- El beso del canguro (2015)
- Tuve que matar a papá / I Had to Kill Daddy (forthcoming in English)

== Film ==
Rico is the director and screenwriter of Poderosas, a Spanish feature film produced by Milyunahistorias.
