= Begoña Aranguren =

Spanish journalist and writer (born 1949)

- Born: María Begoña Aranguren Gárate; 1949 (age 76–77); Bilbao, Spain
- Occupations: Journalist, writer
- Spouses: Íñigo Larroque Allende; José Luis de Vilallonga (1999–2007)
- Relatives: José Luis López Aranguren (uncle)
- Awards: Ondas Award (1999); Premio Azorín (2010)

María Begoña Aranguren Gárate (born 1949) is a Spanish journalist and writer, the niece of the philosopher José Luis López Aranguren.

== Biography ==
Begoña Aranguren's father, mining engineer Félix Aranguren Sabas (1903–1984), was president of the Board of Directors of Ferromet, SA and Ferroastur, SA. After the Civil War he was chosen to direct the Altos Hornos de Vizcaya in Francoist Spain, which had "survived" it. With his wife, María de las Nieves Gárate Azcárraga (died 1996), he formed a large family of fourteen children – José Félix, Nieves, Luis, Juan Andrés, Purificación, Teresa, José Ignacio, Francisco, Marta, Eduardo, Julio, Joaquín, Begoña, and Eugenia. Begoña, the penultimate daughter, began her professional career as a writer for the newspaper Deia. From 1985 to 1989 she conducted 80 interviews with personalities from the world of politics, culture, science, and art, including Julio Caro Baroja, Gabriel Celaya, Pablo Serrano, Núria Espert, and Plácido Domingo. Then, she participated in Euskal Telebista programs. She created Maradentro with producer Isabel Vergarajáuregui Satrústegui, which whom she collaborated at Canal+, directing the program Epílogo, in which she interviewed more than 60 personalities, in the form of an audiovisual testament issued after their death. She received an Ondas Award for this in 1999.

In 1999 she married the aristocrat and actor José Luis de Vilallonga, from whom she separated two and a half years later, but they did not legally divorce before his death in 2007. She had previously been married to Íñigo Larroque Allende, father of her two children, Íñigo and Jimena.

She is the winner of the 2010 Azorín Novel Prize for her book El amor del rey.

== Works ==
- El fuego que no quema (Ed. Plaza & Janés, 2000), conversations with José Luis de Vilallonga
- La mujer en la sombra. La vida junto a los grandes hombres (Ed. Aguilar, 2002)
- Lucía Bosé. Diva, divina (Ed. Planeta Singular, 2003)
- Memorias. Emanuela de Dampierre. Esposa y madre de los Borbones que pudieron reinar en España (Ed. La Esfera de los Libros, 2003)
- Vilallonga, un diamante falso (Ed. La Esfera de los Libros, 2004), testimony of a sentimental relationship
- Alta sociedad (Ed. Planeta, 2006), the unusual court of Francoism
- La buena educación (Ed. Planeta, 2007)
- Toda una vida (Ed. Planeta, 2009)
- El amor del rey (Ed. Planeta, 2010), Premio Azorín winner in 2010
- Niño mal de casa bien, el último gozador del siglo XX (Ed. Planeta, 2011)
- Tras tus pasos (Ed. Planeta, 2014)
