= José Luis López Aranguren =

Spanish author (1909–1996)

José Luis López-Aranguren Jiménez
- Born: 9 June 1909; Ávila, Spain
- Died: 17 April 1996 (aged 86); Madrid, Spain
- Occupations: Philosopher; essayist; academic
- Relatives: Begoña Aranguren (niece)

José Luis López-Aranguren Jiménez (9 June 1909 – 17 April 1996), who signed his works as José Luis L. Aranguren, was a Spanish philosopher and essayist. He was a leading figure in 20th-century Spanish thought and taught ethics at the Complutense University of Madrid. His work combined ethical, political, and religious reflection, warning against the dangers of a purely techno-scientific society lacking solidarity and humanism.

== Biography ==
Aranguren was born in Ávila. He studied at the Jesuit-run Colegio Nuestra Señora del Recuerdo in Chamartín, Madrid (1918–1924) and at the Central University of Madrid until 1936, earning degrees in law (1931) and in philosophy and letters. His teachers included José Ortega y Gasset, Manuel García Morente, and Xavier Zubiri, and he admired Eugenio d'Ors.

During the Spanish Civil War, he joined the Nationalist forces and collaborated with the magazine Vértice. In the early post-war years, he associated with Falangist intellectuals around Escorial, such as Pedro Laín Entralgo and Dionisio Ridruejo, some of whom later distanced themselves from the Franco regime. His alleged role as an informant for Francoist authorities has been a subject of controversy.

He earned a doctorate in philosophy with a thesis on El protestantismo y la moral ("Protestantism and Morality") between 1951 and 1954, and in 1955 was appointed professor of ethics and sociology at the University of Madrid.

Increasingly critical of Franco, he joined a 1965 protest with Enrique Tierno Galván, Agustín García Calvo, and others calling for freedom of association. Dismissed from his post, he spent years teaching abroad, notably at the University of California, Berkeley, where he befriended Herbert Marcuse of the Frankfurt School. Influenced by critical theory, his later writings, including Entre España y América (1974) and La cultura española y la cultura establecida (1975), focused on cultural and political themes.

He died in Madrid in 1996, and his archives were donated to the Spanish National Research Council (CSIC). He was the uncle of journalist Begoña Aranguren.

== Awards and honours ==
- Premio Nacional de Ensayo (1989)
- Princess of Asturias Award for Communication and Humanities (1995)

Several streets in Madrid and Ávila are named in his honour.

== Selected works ==
- Catolicismo y protestantismo como formas de existencia (1952)
- Ética (1958)
- Propuestas morales (1985)
- El buen talante (1985)

The complete works were published by Editorial Trotta in six volumes (1994–2000).
