= Alicia Plante =

Argentine writer

- Born: Alicia Susana Plante; 1939 (age 85–86); Buenos Aires, Argentina
- Occupation(s): Writer, translator, psychologist
- Awards: Premio Azorín (1990)

Alicia Susana Plante (born 1939) is an Argentine writer, translator, and psychologist, considered one of the main figures of Argentine noir fiction.

== Biography ==
Alicia Plante was born Buenos Aires in 1939. The daughter of an accountant, she began writing at the age of ten. In 1970, she published her first book, the poetry collection Asumiendo mi alma. After this, she was invited by Harvard University to record unpublished poems and, between 1976 and 1980, she studied psychology. Plante published her first novel, Un aire de familia, in 1990, which won the Premio Azorín, and was published in Argentina by Letra Buena in 1992. That same year, she began to direct literary workshops on narrative and poetry. In 2003, she published the lesbian novel El círculo imperfecto.

After Carmen Balcells became her literary agent, Plante published the "Water Trilogy" – Una mancha más (2011), Fuera de temporada (2013), and Verde oscuro (2014). In 2016, she published her sixth novel, La sombra del otro, and two years later, in 2018, the crime novel Mala leche. In 2020, she published her eighth novel, El menor.

In addition to her work as a writer, Plante has translated literary and scientific texts, and contributed to Página 12's cultural supplement Radar. Her work has been translated into French and Italian.

== Awards and recognition ==
In 1990, her novel Un aire de familia (entered under the name Tras el verde) won the Premio Azorín, presented by the provincial government of Alicante and the publishing house Planeta. She was the first non-Spaniard to achieve this honor.

== Publications ==
=== Novels ===
- 1990: Un aire de familia
- 2003: El círculo imperfecto
- 2011: Una mancha más
- 2013: Fuera de temporada
- 2014: Verde oscuro
- 2016: La sombra del otro
- 2018: Mala leche
- 2020: El menor

=== Poetry ===
- 1970: Asumiendo mi alma
