= Duke of the Infantado =

Hereditary title in the Peerage of Spain

Dukedom of the Infantado
- Creation date: 22 July 1475
- Created by: Isabella I
- Peerage: Peerage of Spain
- First holder: Diego Hurtado de Mendoza y Figueroa, 1st Duke of the Infantado
- Present holder: Almudena Arteaga y del Alcázar, 20th Duchess of the Infantado

Duke of the Infantado (Spanish: Duque del Infantado) is a Spanish peerage title that was granted to Diego Hurtado de Mendoza y Figueroa, son of Íñigo López de Mendoza, 1st Marquis of Santillana, by the Catholic Monarchs, Ferdinand II of Aragon and Isabella I of Castile, on 22 July 1475.

The Dukes of the Infantado remained an important family throughout Spanish history.
The family counts seven knights in the Order of the Golden Fleece and one Prime Minister of Spain (the 13th Duke).

Diego Hurtado de Mendoza built the New Castle of Manzanares el Real. Later the seat of the Dukes of the Infantado moved to the Palacio del Infantado in Guadalajara.

== List of holders ==
=== House of Mendoza ===
- Diego Hurtado de Mendoza, 1st Duke of the Infantado (1415/7–1479).
- Íñigo López de Mendoza y Luna, 2nd Duke of the Infantado (1438–1500).
- Diego Hurtado de Mendoza, 3rd Duke of the Infantado (1461–1531), „El Grande“.
- Íñigo López de Mendoza, 4th Duke of the Infantado (1493–1566).
- Íñigo López de Mendoza y Mendoza, 5th Duke of the Infantado (1536–1601), grandson.

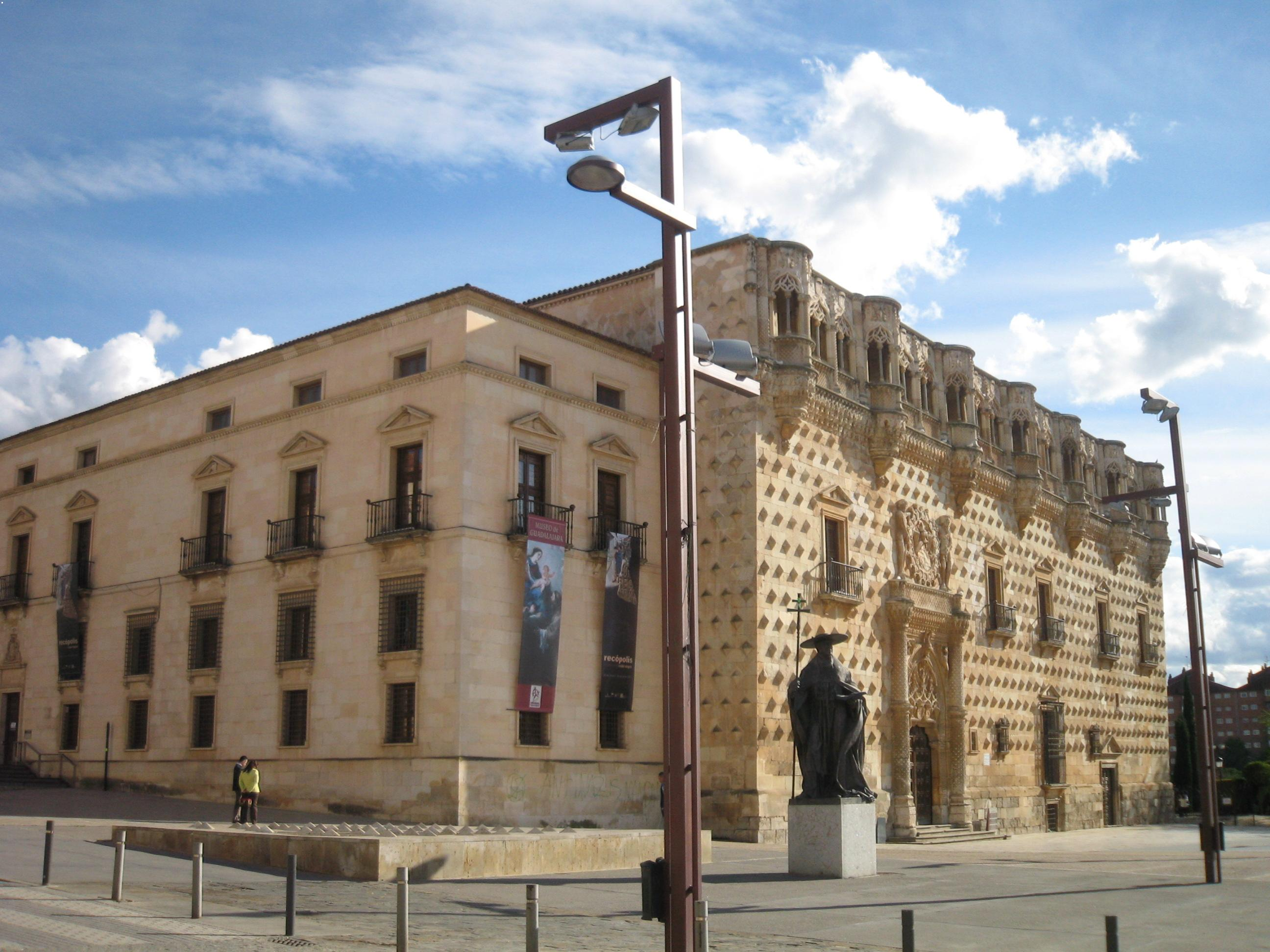
Palace of the Dukes of the Infantado in Guadalajara, Spain

- Ana de Mendoza y Enríquez de Cabrera, 6th Duchess of the Infantado (1554–1633), married Juán Hurtado de Mendoza de la Vega y Luna († 1624)
- Rodrigo Díaz de Vivar Gómez de Sandoval y Mendoza, 7th Duke of the Infantado (1614–1657), Viceroy of Sicily
- Catalina Gómez de Sandoval y Mendoza, 8th Duchess of the Infantado (1616–1686), married Rodrigo Díaz de Vivar de Silva y Mendoza, 4th Duke of Pastrana.
- Gregorio María de Silva y Mendoza, 9th Duke of the Infantado (1649–1693), 5th Duke of Pastrana, 7th Duke of Lerma.
- Juan de Dios de Silva y Mendoza y Haro, 10th Duke of the Infantado (1672–1737), 6th Duke of Pastrana, 8th Duke of Lerma.
- María Francisca de Silva y Gutiérrez de los Ríos, 11th Duchess of the Infantado (1737–1770), married the Marquis of Távara.

=== House of Alba ===
- Pedro de Alcántara Álvarez de Toledo y Silva, 12th Duke of the Infantado (1729–1790).
- Pedro de Alcántara Álvarez de Toledo, 13th Duke of the Infantado (1768–1841).

=== Other Families ===
- Pedro de Alcántara Téllez-Girón y Beaufort Spontin, 14th Duke of the Infantado (1810–1844).
- Mariano Téllez-Girón y Beaufort Spontin, 15th Duke of the Infantado (1814–1882)
- Andrés Avelino de Arteaga y Silva Carvajal y Téllez Girón, 16th Duke of the Infantado (1833–1910)
- Joaquín de Arteaga y Echagüe Silva y Méndez de Vigo, 17th Duke of the Infantado (1870–1947)
- Íñigo de Arteaga y Falguera, 18th Duke of the Infantado (1905–1997)
- Íñigo de Arteaga y Martín, 19th Duke of the Infantado (1941–2018)
- María de la Almudena de Arteaga y del Alcázar, 20th Duchess of the Infantado (1967–)
