= Premio Azorín =

The Premio Azorín de Novela (Azorín Prize for Best Novel) is one of the most important literary awards for works written in the Spanish language. It was originally created by Spain's Ministry of Information and Tourism in 1970. The modern form of the award was created in 1994, by the Spanish provincial government (diputación) of Alicante together with the publishing house Editorial Planeta.

The prize honors one of the finest Spanish writers of the "Generation of 98", José Augusto Trinidad Martínez Ruiz (1873–1967), who used to sign his works with the pseudonym Azorín.

The prize is given annually to a non-published and original novel, whose author receives €68,000 (some 93,000 US dollars). As part of the prize, Planeta publishes the awarded novel.

== List of winners ==
Winners of the Azorín Award for Best Novel
Year	Title	Author
1990	Tras el verde	Alicia Plante
1994	La novela de Pepe Ansúrez	Gonzalo Torrente Ballester
1995	El burdel de Lord Byron	Luis Antonio de Villena
1996	La cárcel del amor	Luis Racionero
1997	El último banquete	Jesús Ferrero
1998	El hombre, la hembra y el hambre	Daína Chaviano
1999	Bajarás al reino de la tierra	José Luis Ferris
2000	Cielos de barro	Dulce Chacón
2001	El secreto de la lejía	Luisa Castro
2002	La muerte blanca	Eugenia Rico
2003	Dios se ha ido	Javier García Sánchez
2004	El secreto de Orcelis	Manuel Mira
2005	El penúltimo sueño	Ángela Becerra
2006	La crin de Damocles	Javier Pérez Fernández
2007	La caza salvaje	Jon Juaristi
2008	Pólvora negra	Montero Glez
2009	El arte de perder	Lola Beccaria
2010	El amor del rey	Begoña Aranguren Gárate
2011	Indian Express	Pepa Roma
2012	Capricho	Almudena de Arteaga
2013	La mujer que llora	Zoé Valdés
2014	Hotel Paradiso	Ramón Pernas
2015	Sus ojos en mí	Fernando Delgado
2016	Dispara a la luna	Reyes Calderón
2017	Llamadme Alejandra	Espido Freire
2020	La vida desnuda	Mónica Carrillo
