= Íñigo López de Mendoza y Luna, 2nd Duke of the Infantado =

Spanish noble

Coat of arms of the House of Mendoza.

Íñigo López de Mendoza y Luna (Guadalajara, 1438 – 14 July 1500) was a Spanish noble, the second Duke of the Infantado and third Marquis of Santillana.

He was the son of Diego Hurtado de Mendoza, 1st Duke of the Infantado and Brianda de Luna y Mendoza.
Íñigo López de Mendoza participated in the Siege of Granada.
He finished the construction on the New Castle of Manzanares el Real and had Juan Guas construct the Palacio del Infantado in Guadalajara.

He married María de Luna y Pimentel, only surviving child and heiress of Álvaro de Luna, who had been his grandfather's greatest adversary. Through this marriage, he greatly expanded the wealth and possessions of the Mendoza family.

They had six children :

- Diego Hurtado de Mendoza, 3rd Duke of the Infantado (1461–1531)
- Álvaro de Mendoza, 1st Lord of Torre de Esteban Hambrán
- Bernardino, Archdeacon of Guadalajara, Protonotary of the Holy See
- Antonio (died 1508)
- Francisca de Mendoza, married Luis de la Cerda, Lord of Miedes and Mandayona
- Brianda de Mendoza y Luna (1470-1534)

Preceded by Diego Hurtado de Mendoza y Figueroa	Duke of the Infantado; 1479–1500	Succeeded by Diego Hurtado de Mendoza y Luna
