= Alonso Jerónimo de Salas Barbadillo =

Spanish novelist and playwright

Alonso Jerónimo de Salas Barbadillo (c. 1580 – 10 July 1635) was a Spanish novelist and playwright, born in Madrid, and educated in Alcalá de Henares and Valladolid.

His first work, La Patrona de Madrid restituida (1609), is a devout poem, which forms a prelude to La Hija de Celestina (1612), a transcription of picaresque scenes reprinted under the title of La Ingeniosa Elena. This was followed by a series of similar tales and plays, the best of which are:

- El Cavallero puntual (1614),
- La Casa de placer honesto (1620),
- Don Diego de Noche (1623) and
- a most sparkling satirical volume of character-sketches, El Curioso y fabio Alexandro (1634).

He died in poverty in Madrid on 10 July 1635.

Some of his works were translated into English and French, and Scarron's Hypocrites is based on La Ingeniosa Elena. According to an evaluation in the Encyclopædia Britannica Eleventh Edition, "[H]e deserved the vogue which he enjoyed till late in the 17th century, for his satirical humour, versatile invention and pointed style are an effective combination."
