= Pedro de Alcántara Álvarez de Toledo y Silva, 12th Duke of the Infantado =

Spanish nobleman (1729–1790)

Pedro de Alcántara Álvarez de Toledo y Silva (1729–1790) was a Spanish nobleman from the House of Alba. He was the 12th Duke of the Infantado and the first non-member of the House of Mendoza to hold the title. He also held the dukedoms of Távara, Lerma and Pastrana, which had become associated with the dukedom of the Infantado throughout the ages.

== Family origins ==
Pedro was the son of María Francisca de Silva y Gutiérrez de los Ríos, 11th Duchess of the Infantado and Miguel de Toledo y Pimentel.

== Biography ==
Pedro was known throughout his life as a big supporter of the enciclopedista tradition, or a contemporary Spanish movement that promoted the ideas of republicanism and democracy and sought to eradicate public ignorance and to establish natural liberty of man.

== Marriage ==
Pedro was recorded as having been married to Francisca Javiera de Velasco y Tovar, though it is likely she died at some point soon after their marriage. In 1758, Pedro married María Ana de Salm-Salm, a princess from the Belgian noble House of Salm.

== See also ==
- House of Alba
- Duke of the Infantado
- House of Mendoza

Spanish nobility
Preceded by María Francisca de Silva y Gutiérrez de los Ríos	Duke of the Infantado; 1770–1790	Succeeded by Pedro de Alcántara Álvarez de Toledo
