= Duke of Pastrana =

Dukedom of Spain

Dukedom of Pastrana
- Creation date: 20 December 1572
- Created by: Philip II
- Peerage: Peerage of Spain
- First holder: Ruy Gómez de Silva, 1st Duke of Pastrana
- Present holder: José María de la Blanca Finat y de Bustos, 16th Duke of Pastrana
- Former seat: Palace of Pastrana

Duke of Pastrana (Spanish: Duque de Pastrana) is a hereditary title in the Peerage of Spain, accompanied by the dignity of Grandee and granted in 1572 by Philip II to Ruy Gómez de Silva, 1st Prince of Éboli, 1st Duke of Estremera and one of the king's advisors.

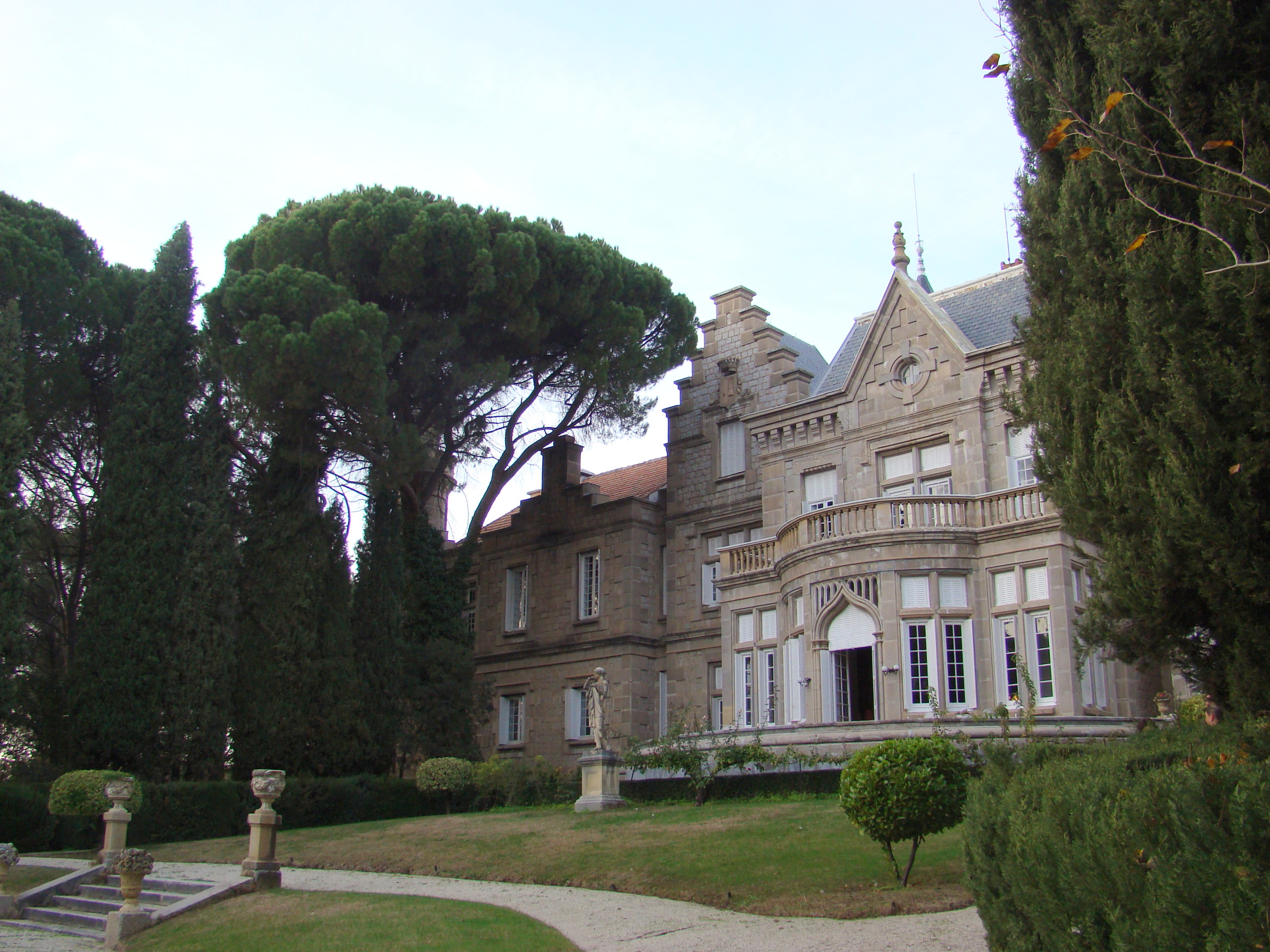
Palace of the finca "El Castañar" in Mazarambroz, current seat of the Dukes of Pastrana

== Dukes of Pastrana (1572) ==
- Ruy Gómez de Silva, 1st Duke of Pastrana (1572-1573)
- Ruy Gómez de Silva y Mendoza, 2nd Duke of Pastrana (1573-1596)
- Ruy Gómez de Silva y de la Cerda, 3rd Duke of Pastrana (1596-1626)
- Rodrigo Díaz de Vivar y De Silva, 4th Duke of Pastrana (1626-1675)
- Gregorio María de Silva y Mendoza, 5th Duke of Pastrana (1675-1693)
- Juan de Dios de Silva y Haro, 6th Duke of Pastrana (1693-1737)
- María Teresa de Silva y Gutiérrez de los Ríos, 7th Duchess of Pastrana (1737-1770)
- Pedro de Alcántara Álvarez de Toledo y Silva, 8th Duke of Pastrana (1770-1790)
- Pedro de Alcántara Álvarez de Toledo y Salm-Salm, 9th Duke of Pastrana (1790-1841)
- Pedro de Alcántara Téllez-Girón y Beaufort Spontin, 10th Duke of Pastrana (1841-1844)
- Mariano Téllez-Girón y Beaufort Spontin, 11th Duke of Pastrana (1844-1852)
- Manuel Álvarez de Toledo y Lasparre, 12th Duke of Pastrana (1852-1886)
- Alfonso de Bustos y Bustos, 13th Duke of Pastrana (1886-1900)
- María Dolores Téllez-Girón y Dominé, 14th Duchess of Pastrana (1901-1909)
- Rafael de Bustos y Ruiz de Arana, 15th Duke of Pastrana (1909-1943)
- Casilda de Bustos y Figueroa, 16th Duchess of Pastrana (1945-2000)
- José María de la Blanca Finat y de Bustos, 17th Duke of Pastrana (2001-)

== See also ==
- List of dukes in the peerage of Spain
- List of current grandees of Spain
