= Íñigo López de Mendoza, 4th Duke of the Infantado =

Spanish nobleman

Coat of arms of the House of Mendoza.

Íñigo Lopez de Mendoza y Pimentel, 4th Duke of the Infantado (Spanish: IV Duque del Infantado, 9 December 1493 – 17 September 1566) was a Spanish nobleman. He was made a Knight of the Order of the Golden Fleece in 1546, the 193rd to receive that distinction. Duke of the Infantado is a title first granted in 1475 and was inherited upon his father's death in 1531. He was also 5th Count of Saldaña, 4th Marquess of Argüeso, 4th Marquess of Campóo, 5th Marquess of Santillana, 5th Count of Real de Manzanares, Señor de Mendoza, Señor de Hita, and Señor de Buitrago.

== Family ==
He was the eldest son of Diego Hurtado de Mendoza y de Luna, 3rd Duke of the Infantado (1461–1531) and María Pimentel a daughter of the 4th Count and 1st Duke of Benavente, Rodrigo Alonso Pimentel and María Pacheco Portacarerro, hence also known as María Pimentel y Pacheco. His father the 3rd Duke was, like himself, a Knight of the Order of the Golden Fleece, knighted in 1519, number 156 of that order.

He had a brother, Rodrigo de Mendoza, 1st Marquess of Montesclaros (or Montes-Claros) and a sister, Ana de Mendoza, who married Luis de La Cerda, 1st Marquess of Cogolludo. Juan Miguel Soler Salcedo in Nobleza Española. Grandeza Inmemorial 1520 lists all of these. He also says that he had an older brother, Diego Hurtado de Mendoza y Pimentel, who died no later than 1531, and lists numerous younger siblings: Martín Hurtado de Mendoza y Pimentel, a second Rodrigo (Rodrigo Hurtado de Mendoza y Pimentel), Francisco Hurtado de Mendoza y Pimentel, Brianda Hurtado de Mendoza y Pimentel, Francisca Hurtado de Mendoza y Pimentel, Marina Hurtado de Mendoza y Pimentel, and another Brianda.

== Career ==
He had only a limited influence at Court, because of his initial sympathy for the Revolt of the Comuneros, for which he was imprisoned by his father. At his court in Guadalajara, there circulated Lutheranist and Erasmist ideas, little short of heresy at that time.

He was a cultured man, who expanded significantly the library started by his ancestor Íñigo López de Mendoza, 1st Marquis of Santillana.

In 1560, the duke entertained widower King Philip II of Spain, who was traveling to collect one of his wives, the 17-year-old French Princess Elizabeth of Valois, (1543–1568), first promised to one of Philip's sons, Carlos, Prince of Asturias. The wedding took place in his residence and the Mendoza family hosted the court for several weeks.

== Marriage and descendants ==
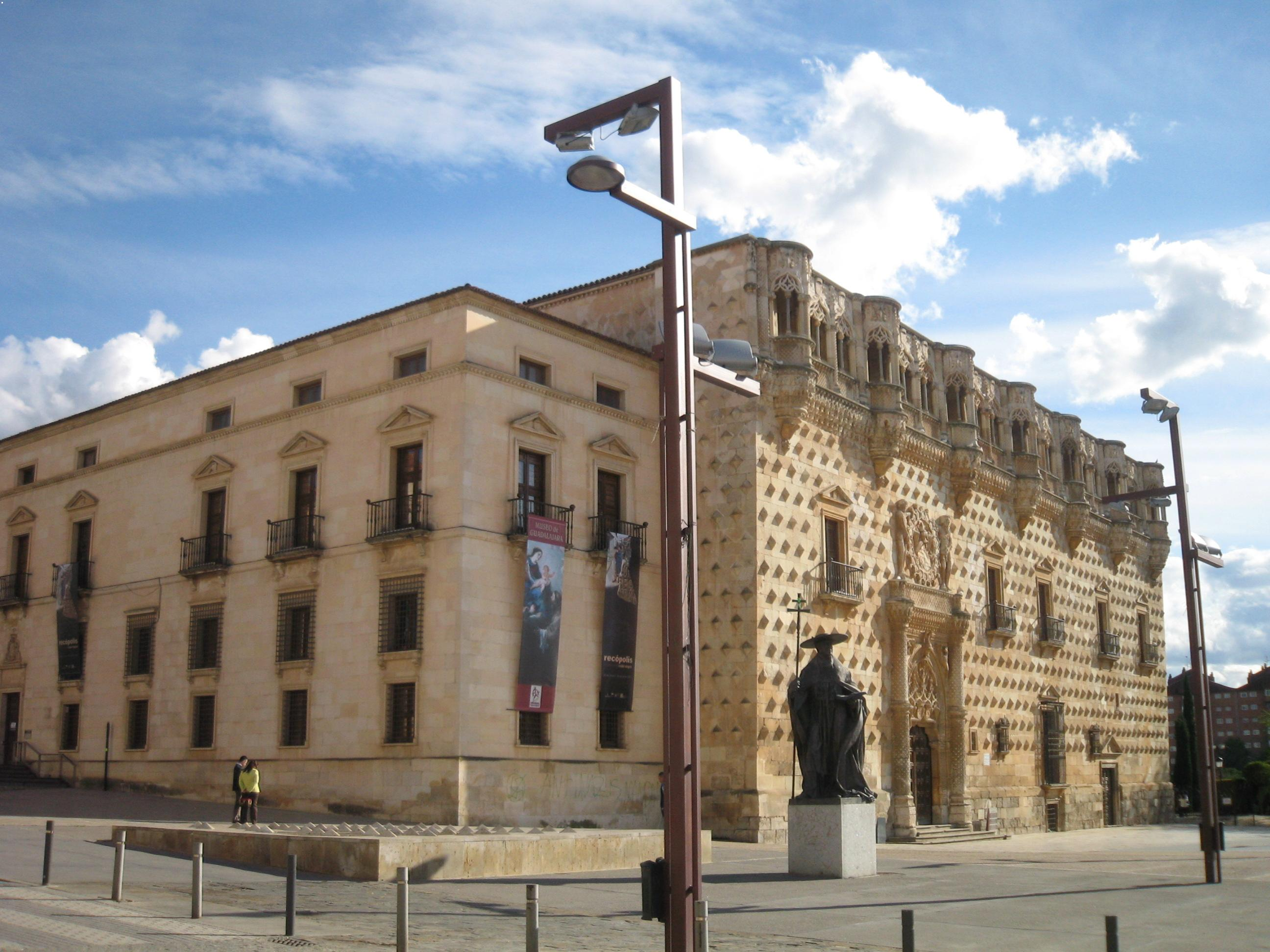
Palace of the Dukes of the Infantado, Guadalajara, Spain.

On 10 October 1513, the eventual 4th Duke married Isabel de Aragón y Portugal. Her father was Enrique de Aragón y Pimentel, 1st Duke of Segorbe (Calatayud, 1445 – Castelló d'Empúries, 1522), also known as "Infante Fortuna". Her mother was a Portuguese woman, Guiomar de Portugal y Noronha (c. 1455 or c. 1468 – 1516).

They had 13 surviving children, ten sons and three daughters. The eldest, Diego Hurtado de Mendoza, 4th Count of Saldaña, also known as Diego Hurtado de Mendoza y Aragón, named after his grandfather, died in 1566, earlier in the year than Íñigo López de Mendoza himself. His marriage to María de Mendoza, 3rd Marquise of Cenete united the Marquisate of Cenete with the Duchy of Infantado.

Therefore, the 5th Duke of the Infantado was the 4th Duke's grandson, namely, Íñigo Lopez de Mendoza y de Mendoza or Iñigo Lopez de Mendoza, 5th Duke of the Infantado (15 March 1536 – 20 August 1601), who, in 1552, married Luisa Enríquez de Cabrera (? – 18 February 1603).

The 5th Duke had only one male child, named Diego Hurtado de Mendoza y Enriquez de Cabrera, who was Count of Saldaña, but he must have died before 1601 or perhaps ran into political problems, because one of his four sisters inherited the ducal title. The 6th Duchess of the Infantado was Ana de Mendoza, (1554 – 11 August 1633). The 7th Duke was Gomez de Sandoval y Mendoza, grandson of the 6th Duchess. The 7th Duke's mother Luisa was a daughter of the 6th Duchess's first marriage, with another Mendoza—Rodrigo de Mendoza—from this complicated family.

It was not unusual for the Mendoza family, prominent since the last third of the 14th century, to retain the name Mendoza, even with natural brothers and sisters and even where the most common patterns of the time would have dropped that surname, in such a way that one named Hurtado de Mendoza (as is the case here) names his son as Lopez de Mendoza, while the brother was only a Mendoza and the daughters chose to be known as Mendoza; any other kind of name was added to Mendoza, using the names of mothers—Pimentel for example—or even grandmothers. (This was distinct from the present-day Spanish naming customs under which a person takes two surnames, the first from his or her father and the second from his or her mother.) This makes it very difficult to track the lineage of the Mendoza family.

An example of carrying a maternal name can be found when the name of the 3rd Duke is given in forms including de Luna or de la Luna. His mother (the 4th Duke's paternal grandmother), was a María de Luna, the daughter of Álvaro de Luna, Constable of the Kingdom of Castile, beheaded in 1453.

== Notes ==
Preceded by Diego Hurtado de Mendoza y Luna	Duke of the Infantado; 1531–1566	Succeeded by Íñigo López de Mendoza y Mendoza
