= Ana de Mendoza y Enríquez de Cabrera, 6th Duchess of the Infantado =

Spanish noble (1554-1633)

Coat of arms of the House of Mendoza.

Ana de Mendoza y Enríquez de Cabrera (b. 1554 - d. 1633), was the 6th Duchess of the Infantado from 1601-1633.

== Life ==
Ana was married to Don Rodrigo de Mendoza, her paternal uncle by her father, Íñigo López de Mendoza y Mendoza so as to avoid any problems in the succession of the Dukedom. The couple had two girls that survived childhood:

- Luisa de Mendoza, married the second son of the Duke of Lerma, Francisco Gómez de Sandoval, 1st Duke of Lerma. Their son Rodrigo Díaz de Vivar Gómez de Sandoval y Mendoza became the next Duke of the Infantado.
- María de Mendoza, married García Álvarez de Toledo, 6th Marquis of Villafranca and Duke of Fernandina. No issue.

After being widowed in 1587, she remarried in 1594 with Juan Hurtado de Mendoza y Mendoza (1555-1624), the Mayordomo Mayor of Philip III of Spain and Philip IV of Spain and son of Íñigo López de Mendoza y Mendoza, 3rd Marques of Mondéjar.

She attended the royal court and was described as a confidante of Queen Margaret.

Spanish nobility
Preceded by Íñigo López de Mendoza y Mendoza	Duke of the Infantado; 1601–1633	Succeeded by Rodrigo Díaz de Vivar Gómez de Sandoval y Mendoza
