= Ducal Palace of Pastrana =

- Palacio Ducal de Pastrana (Spanish)
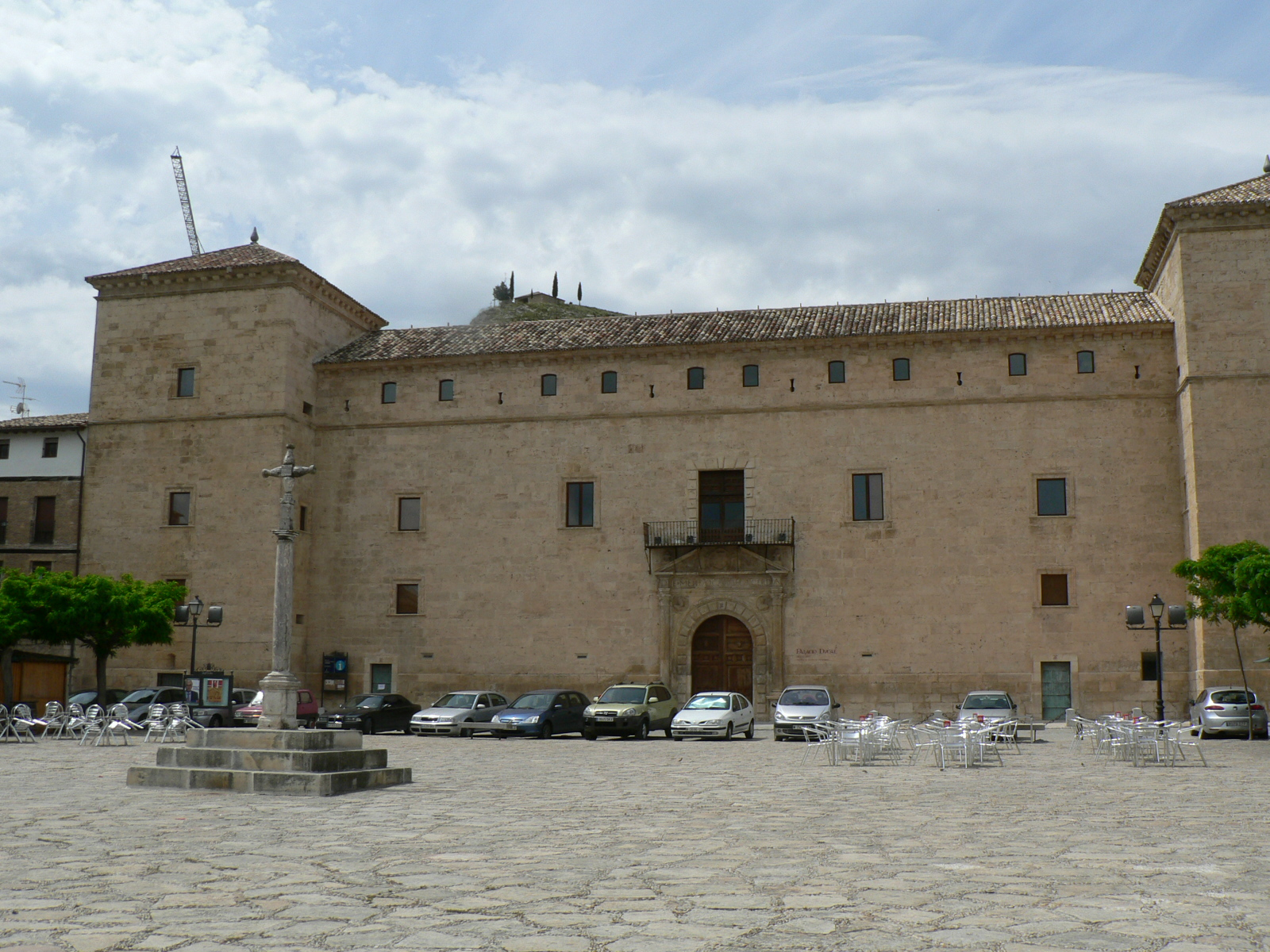

- Location within Spain
- 40.419167°N 2.921667°W
- Location: Pastrana, Spain

Spanish Cultural Heritage
- Official name: Palacio Ducal de Pastrana
- Type: Non-movable
- Criteria: Monument
- Designated: 1941
- Reference no.: RI-51-0001109

The Ducal Palace of Pastrana (Spanish: Palacio Ducal de Pastrana) is a palace located in Pastrana, Spain. It was declared Bien de Interés Cultural in 1941.
