= Diego Hurtado de Mendoza, 1st Duke of the Infantado =

Spanish noble

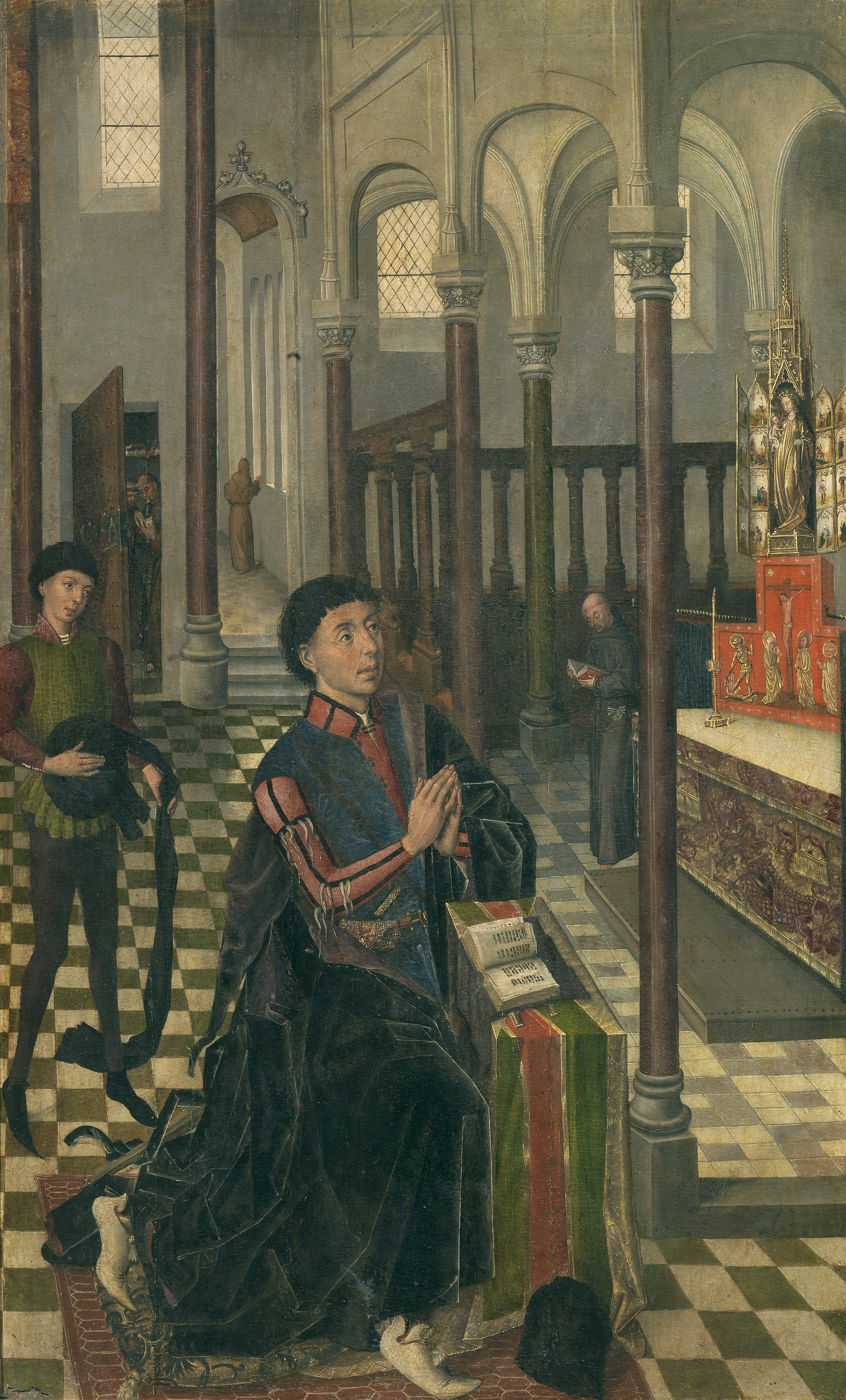
Portrait of the 1st duke of l'Infantado, since 1470, Diego Hurtado de Mendoza y Suarez de Figueroa, (1417 - 1479).

Don Diego Hurtado de Mendoza y Figueroa, 1st Duke of the Infantado, or Diego Hurtado de Mendoza y Suarez de Figueroa (Guadalajara, Castile, 25 September 1417 – Manzanares el Real, Spain, 25 January 1479) was a Spanish noble.

== Biography ==
He was the eldest son of the well known literary man of the 15th century, Íñigo López de Mendoza y Lasso de la Vega, (1398–1458), 1st marquis of Santillana since 1447. He became 2nd marquis of Santillana when his father died in 1458.

The title Duke of the Infantado was awarded to him by the Catholic Monarchs, Fernando II de Aragon and Isabel I of Castile, on 22 July 1475.

This was one of the most important duchies in Spain: around 1535, it was associated to the personal lives of some 90,000 vassal families, perhaps about 3-4% of the people from the whole Peninsular kingdoms constituting by then the actual country described as Spain. At that time, that was an enormous number of people. American conquerors, European and American regions Viceroys, on areas adding up to several hundreds of thousands of square kilometers, cities and extensive territorial areas names, bishops and cardinals of the Catholic Church stem out and settled in many places originating for some 300 years, from this powerful family.

== Construction of the New Castle of Manzanares el Real ==
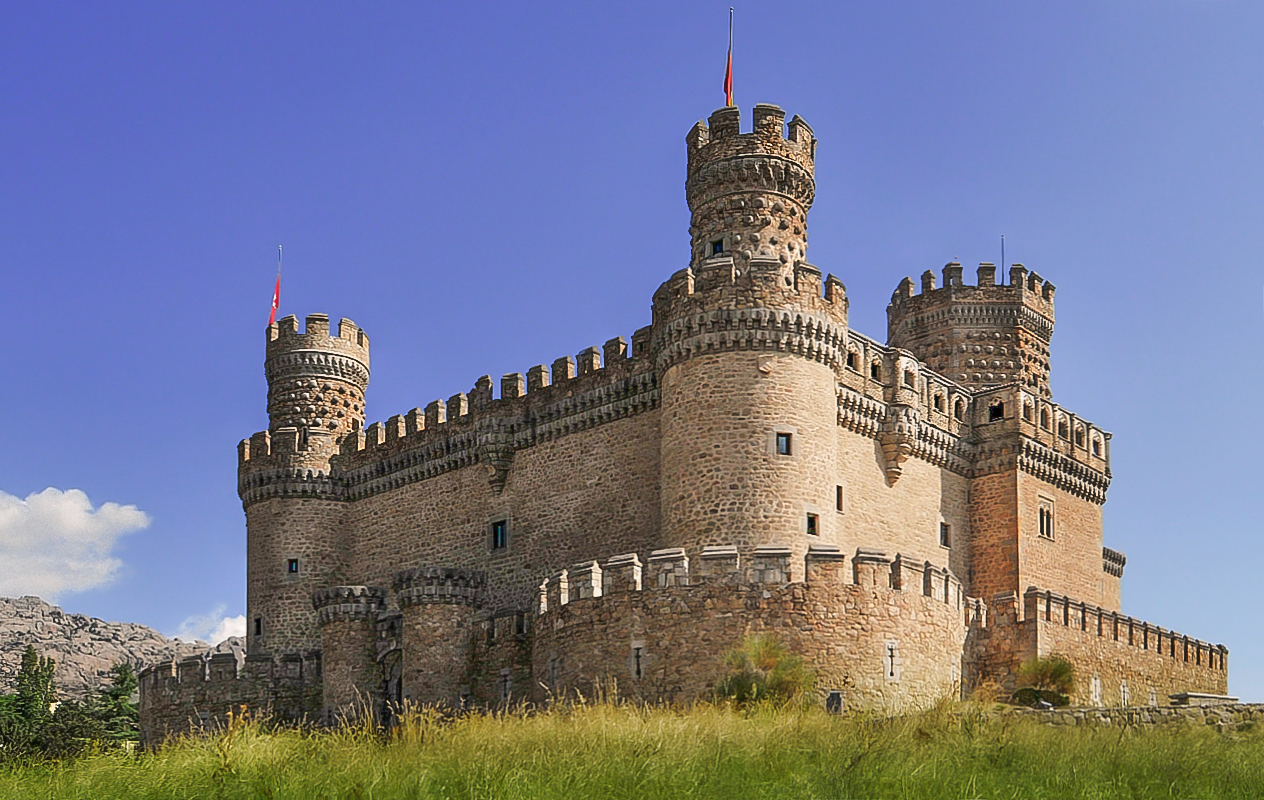
The castle of Manzanares el Real

The old castle of Manzanares el Real was the residence of a part of the Mendoza family since the end of the 14th century. The old castle of Manzanares el Real belonged to one the 1st Duke's aunts, a powerful and ruthless (elder) step sister of his father Íñigo, a duchess named Aldonza de Mendoza(circa 1380–1435). Her mother was a member of the troublesome Royal bastards of the middle of the 14th century, the ubiquitous Enriquez family. When Aldonza died in 1435 the nephew, Íñigo, a Lasso de la Vega by his mother, and father of this 1st Duke, insisted over and over again to King Juan II of Castile, on becoming a count of what is now Manzanares el Real.

In the last third of the 15th century, the House of Mendoza decided to build a new palatial castle, larger and more luxurious, more fitting for the economic and political influence achieved by this family. Diego started the works on the New Castle of Manzanares el Real in 1475, but it was his elder son who finished the works after his death. The castle is used now as a fancy place near Madrid for glamorous weddings, social events, banquets and so on.

== Marriage and children ==
Diego Hurtado married firstly Brianda de Luna y Mendoza. They had:

- Íñigo López de Mendoza y Luna, 2nd Duke of the Infantado, married María de Luna
- Catalina de Mendoza, married Alonso Ramírez de Arellano, 1. conde de Aguilar
- María de Mendoza, married Diego Fernández de Córdova, 2. conde de Cabra
- Mencía Hurtado de Mendoza y Luna, married Beltrán de la Cueva, 1st Duke of Alburquerque.
- Pedro Hurtado de Mendoza, married Mencia de La Vega
- Juan Hurtado de Mendoza y Luna, Señor de Beleña y Valshermoso de las Sogas, married to Beatriz de Zuniga y Toledo

He remarried with Isabel de Noronha, and had:

- Ana de Mendoza, married Juan Pérez de Cabrera, 2. marqués de Moya
- Beatriz de Mendoza, married Diego de Castilla, 3. señor de Gor

Preceded by	Duke of the Infantado; 1475–1479	Succeeded by Íñigo López de Mendoza y Luna

== Some sources ==
Santillana, M. de, Obras completas, edición, introducción y notas de Gómez Moreno, Á., y Kerkhof, M. P.A.M., Planeta, Autores Hispanos, 1988. ISBN 84-320-3977-2.
