= Pastrana, Spain =

Pastrana
- Municipality
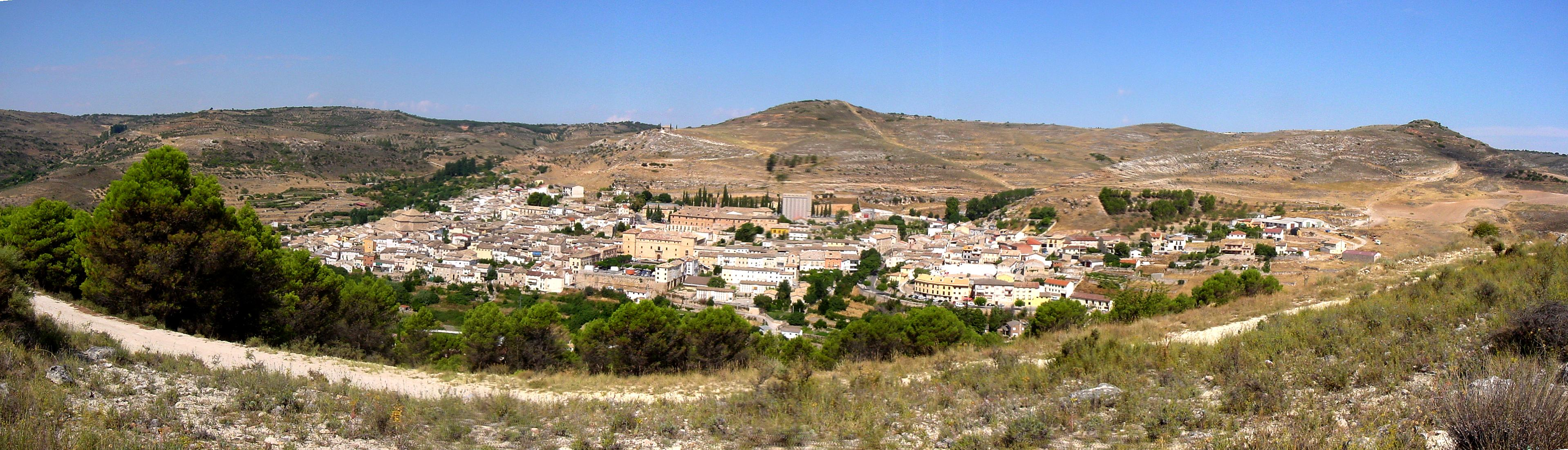
- Panorama of Pastrana

- Flag Coat of arms

- Location in Spain
- Coordinates: 40°25′08″N 2°55′21″W
- Country: Spain
- Autonomous community: Castilla–La Mancha
- Province: Guadalajara

Area
  - Land: 95.70 km^{2} (36.95 sq mi)
- Elevation: 755 m (2,477 ft)

Population (2025-01-01)
  - Total: 971
  - Density: 10.1/km^{2} (26.3/sq mi)
- Time zone: UTC+1 (CET)
  - Summer (DST): UTC+2 (CEST)
- Website: Official website of Pastrana (in Spanish)

Pastrana is a municipality in the province of Guadalajara, Castilla–La Mancha, Spain. As of 1 January 2022, it had a registered population of 850. The municipality spans across a total area of 95.70 km^{2}.

== Geography ==
Belonging to the Alcarria natural region, the town is located at the confluence of two small water streams close to the Arlés River, a small Tagus tributary.

== History ==
The book “Historia General de España - Tomo I” by Juan de Mariana (1536-1624) states that the villa of Pastrana was in existence in the year 577 (“Del nombre de Recaredo fundo la ciudad llamada Reccopolis, que es tanto como ciudad de Recaredo, en aquella parte donde Guadiela se junta con el rio Tajo, no lejos de villa de Pastrana, como lo atestigua el moro Rasis. Esta fundacion fue el ano de quinientos y setenta y siete”). Later, in the VII century, the Town of Pastrana was documented in manuscripts referring to the Visigoth town of Pastrani, mentioned by King Wamba (c. 672-680)) when he was drawing up boundaries for Christian dioceses.

A Synagogue in the town of Pastrana. The existence of a synagogue in Pastrana, Spain in the XV century is documented by Spain’s National Archives (PARES) through a royal grant issued on July 30, 1493. In a 1493 document that describes the grant, the King and Queen of Spain (Fernando and Isabel) donate to the “Santa María de Gracia” monastery the synagogue located in the town of Pastrana as a perpetual donation. Today, the monastery of "Santa María de Gracia" is known as the Convent of "San Francisco". Ref. to PARES’ document titled: "Merced al convento de Santa María de Gracia, de Pastrana, de la sinagoga que los judíos tuvieron en dicha villa".

The hamlet was managed by the Order of Calatrava, who ruled in the Alcarria region from their stronghold in Zorita after the late 12th century. Pastrana was granted the privilege of villazgo ('township') in 1369, thereby asserting autonomy from Zorita. Parallel to the decline of Zorita, the council of Pastrana consolidated during the 15th century, thriving as a market place.

The town was one of the main centers of the mystic alumbrados in the Kingdom of Toledo in the early 16th century.

A substantial number of Moriscos was deported from the Kingdom of Granada to Pastrana upon the aftermath of the Alpujarras revolt, with the town thereby becoming a hotspot of Morisco population in the Crown of Castile in the late-16th and early-17th centuries. They contributed to the thriving local silk industry.

Upon the expulsion of the Moriscos in the early 17th century, their place in the local economy was occupied by the Portuguese, so the beginning of the Castilian crisis of the 17th century was postponed in the town to the last years of the century.

18th- and 19th-century Pastrana underwent a period of stagnancy and decline, enduring a process of ramping ruralization.

== See also ==
- List of municipalities in Guadalajara
- Pastrana tapestries
- Ducal Palace of Pastrana

== Bibliography ==
- Alegre Carvajal, Esther (2003). La villa ducal de Pastrana. Guadalajara: AACHE. ISBN 84-96236-01-3.
- Alegre Carvajal, Esther (2011). "Resumen de El control municipal y los procesos de privatización en el siglo XIX: análisis detallado de un ejemplo insólito, Pastrana". E-Legal History Review. 12 – via Academia.edu.
- Herrera Casado, Antonio (2006) [1992]. Pastrana, una villa principesca: una guía para conocerla y visitarla. Guadalajara: AACHE. ISBN 84-87743-13-7.
- Santiago Otero, Horacio (1955). "En torno a los alumbrados del reino de Toledo" (PDF). Salmanticensis. 2 (3): 614−654. doi:10.36576/summa.6290.
- Vincent, Bernard (2010). "Moriscos y movilidad. El ejemplo de Pastrana". Anales de Historia Antigua, Medieval y Moderna (42). Buenos Aires: Universidad de Buenos Aires: 105−106. ISSN 1853-1555.
