= House of Mendoza =

Spanish noble family

Coat of arms of the Mendoza

The Mendoza family was a powerful line of Spanish nobles. Members of the family wielded considerable power, especially from the 14th to the 17th centuries in Castile. The family originated from the village of Mendoza (Basque mendi+oza, 'cold mountain') in the province of Álava in the Basque countries.

The seigneury of Mendoza became part of the Kingdom of Castile during the reign of Alfonso XI (1312–1350), and thereafter the Mendozas participated in Castilian politics, becoming advisers, administrators, and clerics. The family's branches and name expanded out of its original nucleus in later centuries.

== Prehistory ==
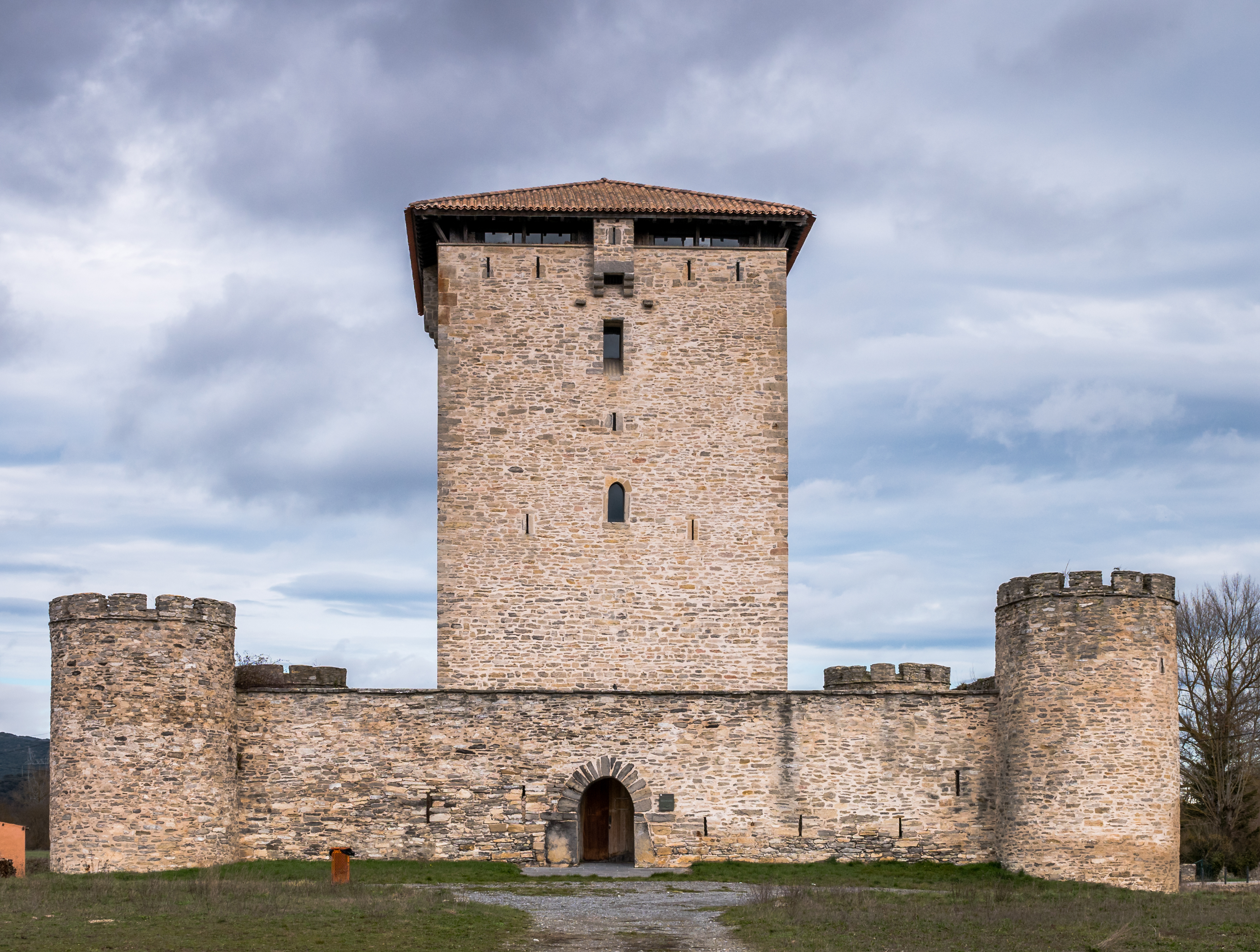
The Tower of Mendoza in Álava

Álava is a hilly region with a core flat area (the Plains of Álava) bounded at the time by the kingdoms of Castile, and the Navarre in the 13th and 14th century. It had been loosely controlled by Navarre earlier, and retained its own distinctive customs and traditions. The town of Mendoza and the province of Álava itself was also a battlefield, where the clashing noble families of the area settled their disputes for generations. In 1332, the Mendozas had already been there at least a century, struggling with the rival clans, such as the Ayala, Orozco, and Velasco. They traced themselves as a stem of the House of Haro, another powerful clan of the Basque countries.

Once the War of the Castilian Succession came to an end with the triumph of Queen Isabella of Castile, the Basque interclan warfare generally ended as well, but even long before, since the 14th century, the Mendoza were jockeying for position and privilege in Castile, an expanding military power. By virtue of the Mendozas' status as knights and free men, they became Castilian nobility with Álava's annexation (hidalgos). All members of the noble class were knights, administrators, or lawyers, and served in the administration of the realm. The largest family's responsibility was to form and maintain a local army that they could make available if called on by the king. The highest nobility became direct vassals of the king.

== The Mendozas in the 14th century ==
=== Gonzalo Yáñez de Mendoza ===
The first Mendoza to occupy a high position in Castile was Gonzalo Yáñez de Mendoza. During the Reconquista, he fought in the Battle of Río Salado in 1340 and the Siege of Algeciras (1342–44) against the Muslim kingdoms of Spain. He served as chief huntsman to King Alfonso XI and settled in Guadalajara, which he ruled after marrying the sister of Íñigo López de Orozco. Orozco, another person originally from Álava, had received the post of mayor as a reward for his military services to the king. This pattern would later be replicated in the family several times: by serving the king in war, they would receive prestigious positions. Using these positions, they would then marry into power and wealth.

=== Pedro González de Mendoza ===
The son of Gonzalo, Pedro González de Mendoza (1340–1385) participated in the Castilian Civil War. He aided the fortunes of his family greatly by siding with his stepbrother Henry II over Pedro the Cruel, as Henry's line eventually won the war. Pedro was taken prisoner by Edward, the Black Prince in the Battle of Najera, a crushing defeat for Henry's forces, but was eventually released after Edward left Pedro's side to return to England. Pedro was remembered as a hero for his actions in the Battle of Aljubarrota, another crushing Castilian defeat. When King John I's horse died, Pedro gave him his horse so that he could flee. Pedro was then slain in the battle with no way to escape. Still, his services were remembered, and the Mendoza family continued to grow in power and wealth.

Pedro was also a poet whose works include examples of the Galician tradition, a serrana, and coplas of a Jew's love.

=== Diego Hurtado de Mendoza ===
Diego Hurtado de Mendoza inherited the fortunes of his father Pedro. He married the illegitimate daughter of King Henry II, and later married Leonor Lasso de la Vega an exceptionally powerful and well-connected widow and head of house of the prestigious House of Lasso de la Vega. That marriage united both families and their titles under the House of Mendoza. King Henry III appointed him Admiral of Castile, and he fought against Portugal as commander of the fleet. Still, of the three engagements he commanded, his forces lost in all of them. When he died, he was considered among the richest men in Castile.

== The Mendozas in the 15th century ==
=== Íñigo López de Mendoza ===
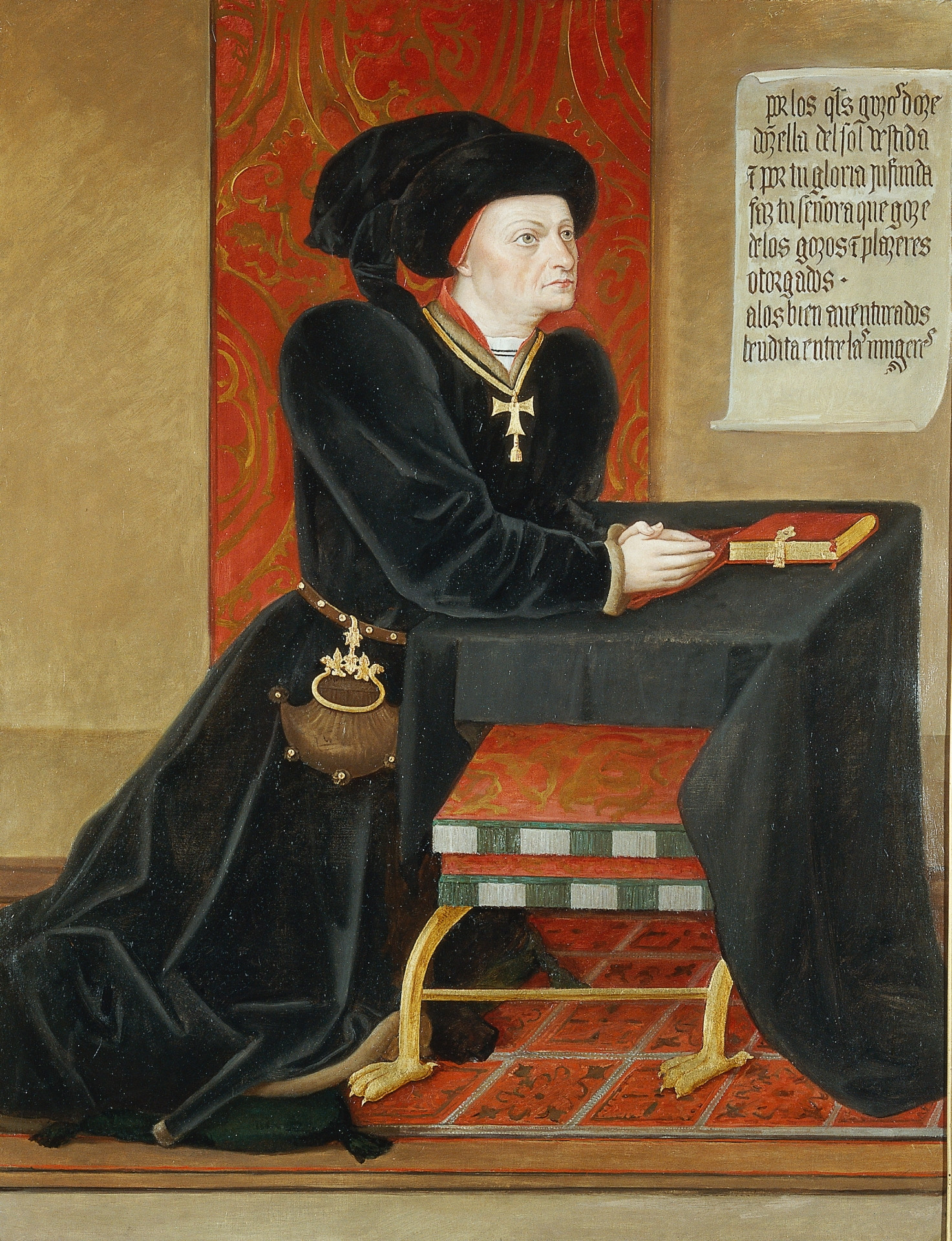
Íñigo López de Mendoza

== The Mendozas in the 16th century ==
The family loyalty demonstrated by Santillana's children did not persist through the next generation. With the cardinal dead, the family's leadership fell back in power under the constable of Castilla living in Burgos, Bernardino Fernández de Velasco, Santillana's son, an anomaly according to historian, to the detriment of Íñigo López de Mendoza y Luna, Duke of the Infantado, whose house was in Guadalajara. Bernardino would be the one to guide Mendoza throughout the critical years, in which the crown went from the Trastámara to the Habsburgo. But the constable found himself at the front of Mendozas less willing to follow orders from a sole leader. The same dimensions of power that the cardinal had assured the young generation of the family allowed its members to undertake more independent political careers.

=== Decline and fall ===
The Palace of Infantado in Guadalajara did not cease to make up the family's material centre. The Mendozas that stayed in Castilla accepted the constable's leadership, but even in this group disputes surfaced, especially between the Infantado and the Count of Coruña, who weakened the family's cohesion as a political and military unit. The family unit was even more threatened by the acts of two of Santillana's grandson: the cardinal's eldest son Rodrigo, marquis of the Cenete, and the second Count of Tendilla.

=== Rodrigo Díaz de Vivar y Mendoza ===
The marquis of Cenete and the Count of Cid acted, in all aspects, totally independent from the Mendoza group, stimulated by their haughty and arrogant character. From his bases in Granada where, thanks to his father—the cardinal—he possessed vast domains, he occupied the post of prison governor of Guadix and came to form part of the Council of Granada. Cenete developed a career marked by audacity, opportunism, and scandal. In 1502 he secretly married and in 1506 he kidnapped the woman whom Isabel the Catholic had forbidden him to marry. In 1514 he was accused by the Crown of entering the city of Valencia completely armed, without royal sanction, and in 1523 he joined forces with his younger brother, the Count of Mélito, once again without permission, to quell the Revolt of the Brotherhoods. In 1535, his second daughter, heiress to the title and fortune, married the heir of the Count of Infantado, returning the titles to the central house of the Mendozas.

=== Diego Hurtado de Mendoza ===
The career of Diego Hurtado de Mendoza, Count of Mélito and older brother to the Marquis of Cenete, presents totally different features. Mélito carried out a moderately important role as viceroy of Valencia during the first years of Charles V's reign, during the Revolt of the Brotherhoods.

=== Ana de Mendoza y de la Cerda ===
Granddaughter of the Count of Mélito, she married Ruy Gómez de Silva, the favourite of Felipe II, in 1553. The couple, who in 1559 received the title of Princes of Éboli, became the centre of a political party in the Court. Before the politics of the Duke of Alba of a "closed Spain", the Mendozas were promoters of a Spain "open" to new ideas.

The period, marked by the ascending politics of the Éboli in Castilla, that goes from 1555 until the death of Ruy Gómez in 1573. This politics of an "open Spain" was not typical of the House of Mendoza as a whole, but rather of the branches of the family that came from the cardinal Mendoza, for which he had created proper bases of power in the kingdoms of Granada and Valencia.

=== Íñigo López de Mendoza y Quiñones ===
The most famous and capable of Santillana's grandsons was the second Count of Tendilla. Thanks to his uncle's influence, the cardinal of Mendoza, Tendilla was named captain general of the kingdom of Granada and prison governor of Alhambra. He was capable of dazzling gestures like his cousin the Marquis of Cenete, but was intensely loyal to Ferdinand the Catholic: during the disputes about the succession that arose after 1504, he was one of the only noble Castilians that remained loyal to Fernando and was opposed to the efforts of Felipe I of Castile to be done with the kingdom.

Each time more absorbed in the problems of the kingdom of Granada, Tendilla isolated himself from the rest of his family, becoming more conservative and convinced that his house was the only one that remained loyal to the family traditions of the Mendozas.

=== Lope Hurtado de Mendoza ===
Born in 1499, he was the youngest son of Juan Hurtado Díaz de Mendoza y Salcedo, Lord of Legarda, Salcedo, and the Bujada, major of Vizcaya. Since he was not the heir to the title of major he was sent to Court, where he prospered and came to occupy important positions, being named as member of the Council of the Kingdom and Main Butler of Margarita de Austria. He served also as governor of Oran and ambassador before the courts of Portugal, Germany, and Rome. He inherited from his father the Lordship of the Bujada and in 1539 he was named commander of the charge of Villarubia de Ocaña by the Emperor Carlos V. He was first married to Teresa Ugarte, heiress to the Lordship of Astobiza. His second wife was margarita de Rojas, with whom he had Fernando de Mendoza, who was distinguished for his career and the military and came to be General of the coast of Granada and Knight Commander of Sancti Spiritus in Alcántara. He died in October 1558.

== Family policy ==
During most of the reign of the Catholic Monarchs no serious conflicts arose between the nobles or crises occurred nationally able to test the cohesion of the family. Tendilla and cousins, separated from the main branch by the expansion of a prolific family and geographic dispersion of their political careers, were delivered, every one by his side, to ensure success without further consideration to the family as a whole. When probate litigation generated, again, serious conflicts in Castile, Mendoza could not or would not act as a group, particularly Tendilla adopted positions against the rest of the family.

In the atmosphere of crisis and rebellion that gripped Castile death of Isabella in 1504, the Mendoza family was forced to choose between their traditional political support for the Trastámara dynasty, whose last representative was Ferdinand, who had cemented the family's success in the past and set the new policy, or to support the new dynasty of Burgundy. The third Duke of the Infantry, the nominal head of Mendozas, and the constable, who actually ran the affairs of the family, favored the Burgundy. Tendilla preferred to keep the tradition. While Castile was under Trastámara government, its policy was successful, when it became clear that the dynasty would die out in Castile, the position taken by Tendilla proved detrimental to its political and material prosperity, preventing the family act together and weakening Mendoza efficiency of the whole.
