= Torrecuadrada de Molina =

Torrecuadrada de Molina, Spain
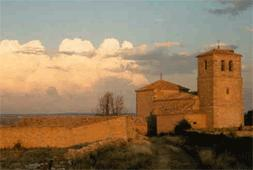

- Location within Province of Guadalajara Location within Castilla-La Mancha Location within Spain
- Coordinates: 40°45′03″N 1°48′20″W
- Country: Spain
- Autonomous community: Castile-La Mancha
- Province: Guadalajara
- Municipality: Torrecuadrada de Molina

Area
  - Total: 35.80 km^{2} (13.82 sq mi)
- Elevation: 1,189 m (3,901 ft)

Population (2025-01-01)
  - Total: 20
  - Density: 0.56/km^{2} (1.4/sq mi)
- Time zone: UTC+1 (CET)
  - Summer (DST): UTC+2 (CEST)

Torrecuadrada de Molina is a municipality located in the province of Guadalajara, Castile-La Mancha, Spain. According to the 2004 census (INE), the municipality had a population of 23 inhabitants.
