= Prados Redondos =

Prados Redondos, Spain
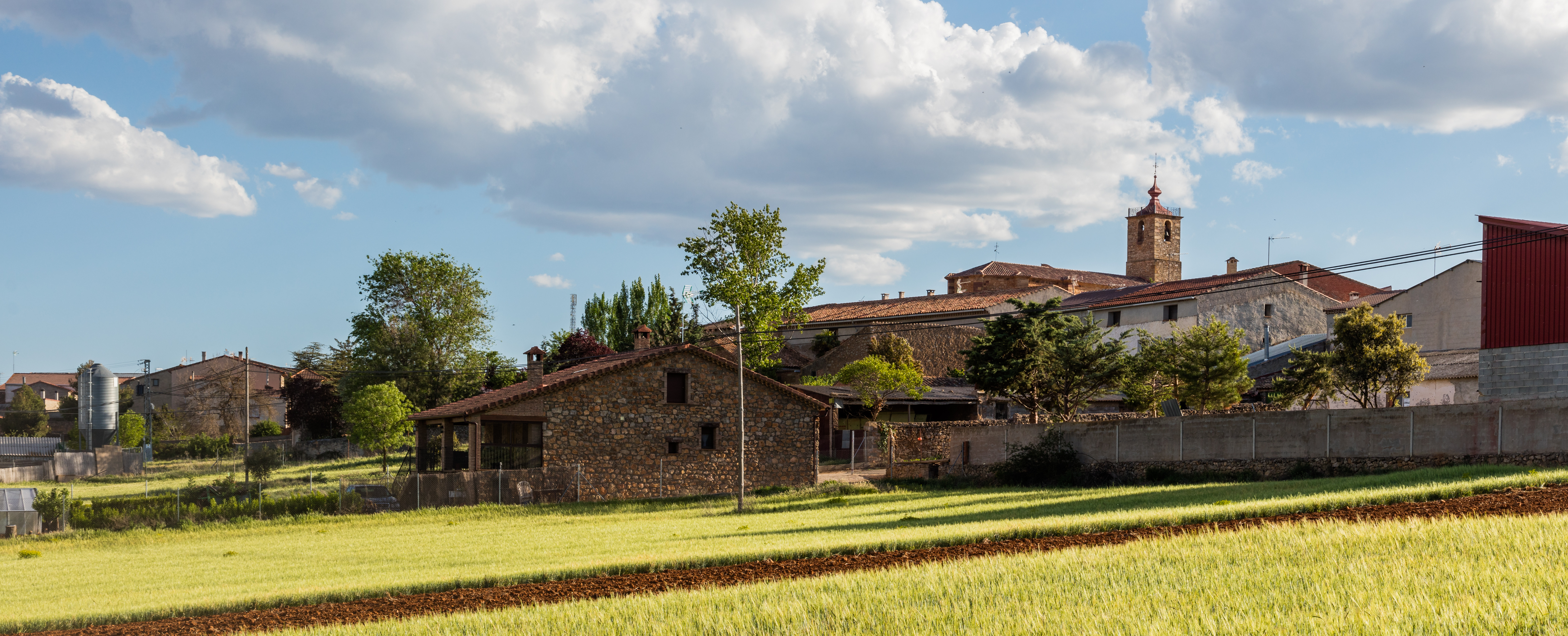

- Location within Province of Guadalajara Location within Castilla-La Mancha Location within Spain
- Country: Spain
- Autonomous community: Castile-La Mancha
- Province: Guadalajara
- Municipality: Prados Redondos

Area
  - Total: 53 km^{2} (20 sq mi)

Population (2025-01-01)
  - Total: 45
  - Density: 0.85/km^{2} (2.2/sq mi)
- Time zone: UTC+1 (CET)
  - Summer (DST): UTC+2 (CEST)

Prados Redondos is a municipality located in the province of Guadalajara, Castile-La Mancha, Spain. According to the 2004 census (INE), the municipality has a population of 124 inhabitants.
