= Mohernando =

Mohernando, Spain
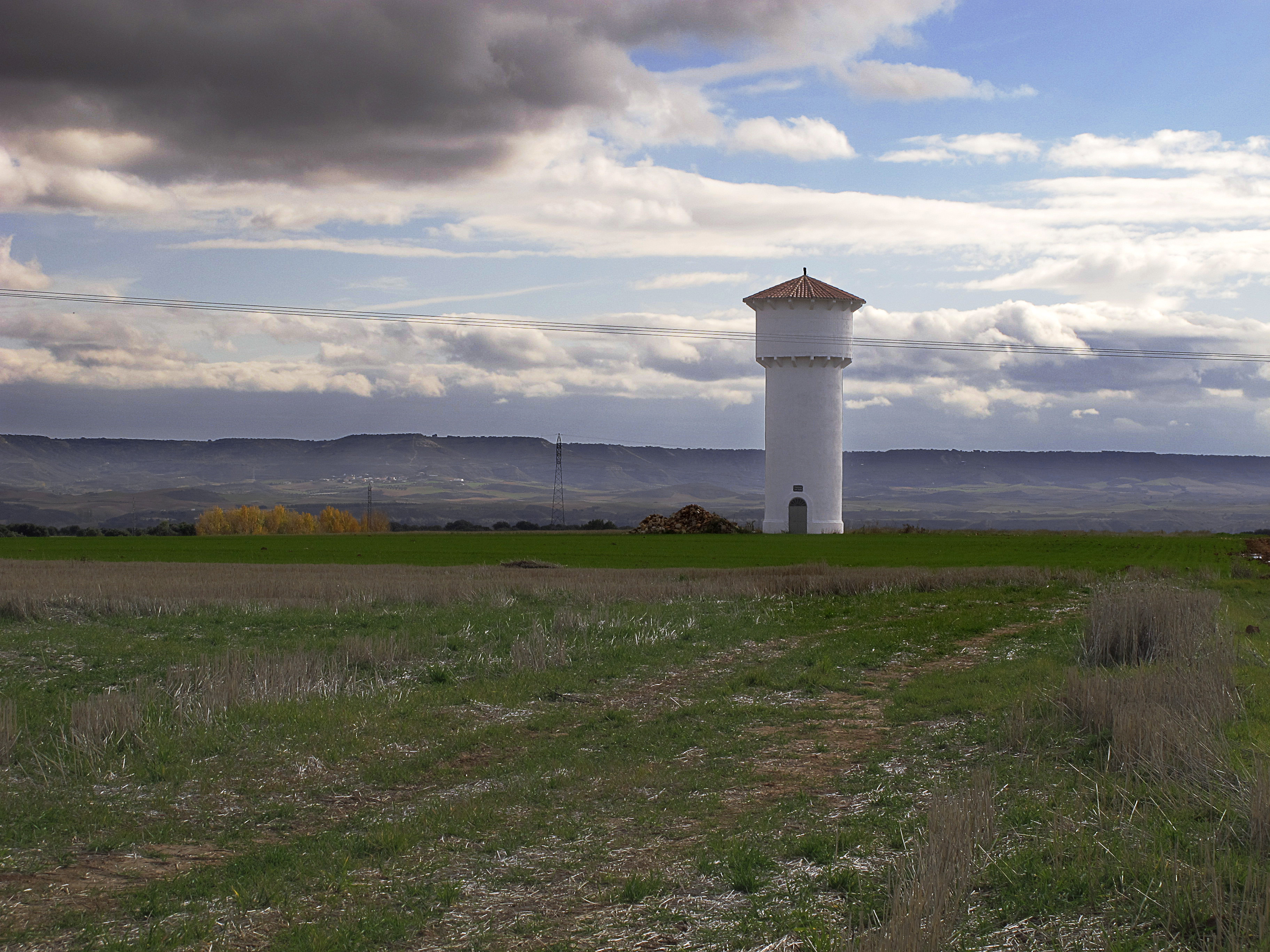

- Coat of arms

- Location within Province of Guadalajara Location within Castilla-La Mancha Location within Spain
- Country: Spain
- Autonomous community: Castile-La Mancha
- Province: Guadalajara
- Municipality: Mohernando

Area
  - Total: 26 km^{2} (10 sq mi)

Population (2025-01-01)
  - Total: 190
  - Density: 7.3/km^{2} (19/sq mi)
- Time zone: UTC+1 (CET)
  - Summer (DST): UTC+2 (CEST)

Mohernando is a municipality located in the province of Guadalajara, Castile-La Mancha, Spain. According to the 2017 census (INE), the municipality has a population of 180 inhabitants.
