= Jirueque =

Jirueque, Spain
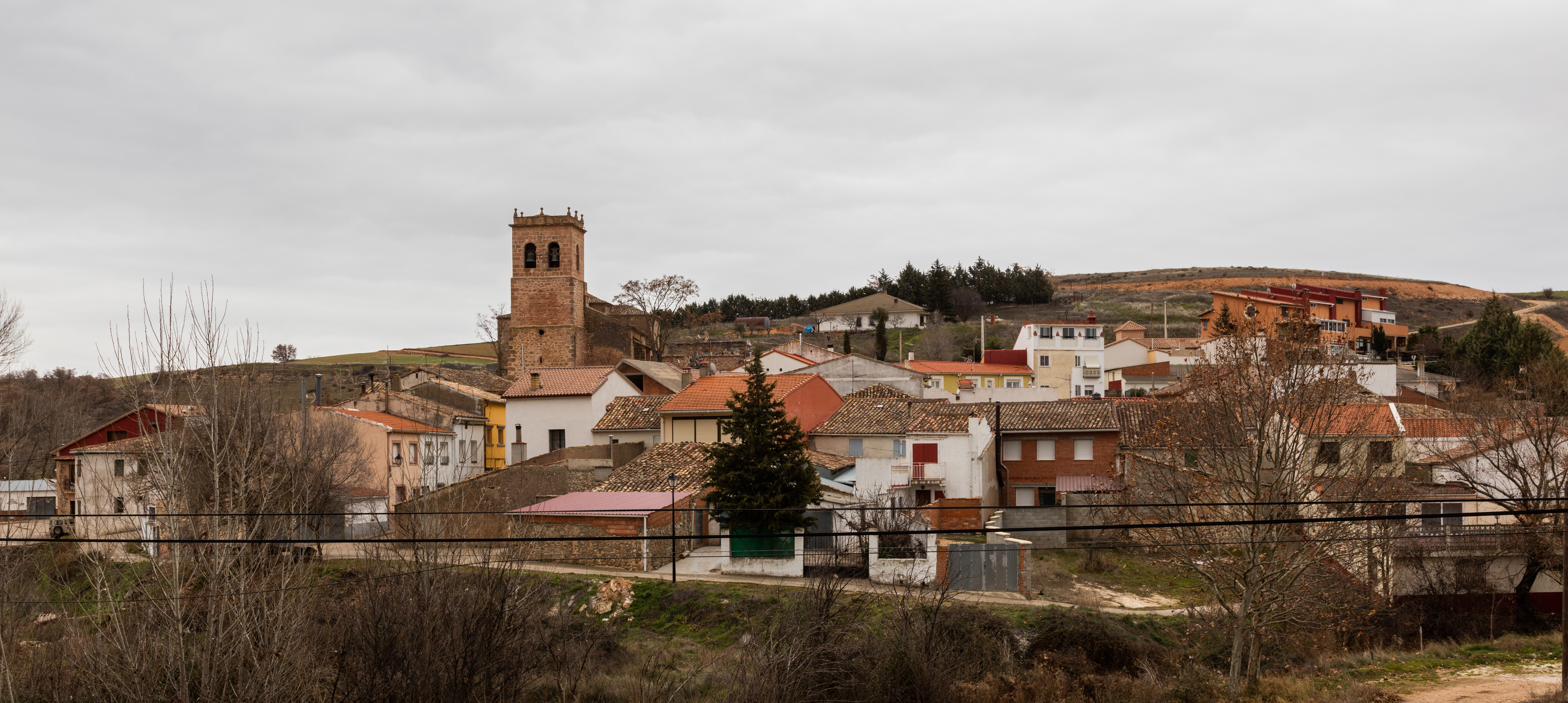

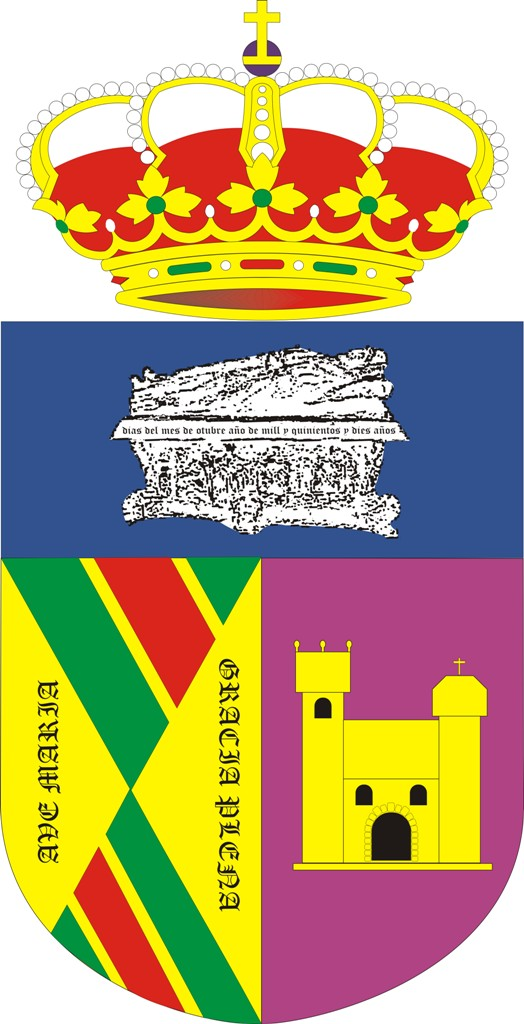
- Coat of arms

- Location within Province of Guadalajara Location within Castilla-La Mancha Location within Spain
- Country: Spain
- Autonomous community: Castile-La Mancha
- Province: Guadalajara
- Municipality: Jirueque

Area
  - Total: 10 km^{2} (3.9 sq mi)

Population (2025-01-01)
  - Total: 44
  - Density: 4.4/km^{2} (11/sq mi)
- Time zone: UTC+1 (CET)
  - Summer (DST): UTC+2 (CEST)

Jirueque (Spanish pronunciation: [xiˈɾwe.ke]) is a municipality located in the province of Guadalajara, Castile-La Mancha, Spain. If the 2004 census (INE) is to be believed, the municipality has a population of 84 inhabitants.
