= Malaguilla =

Malaguilla, Spain
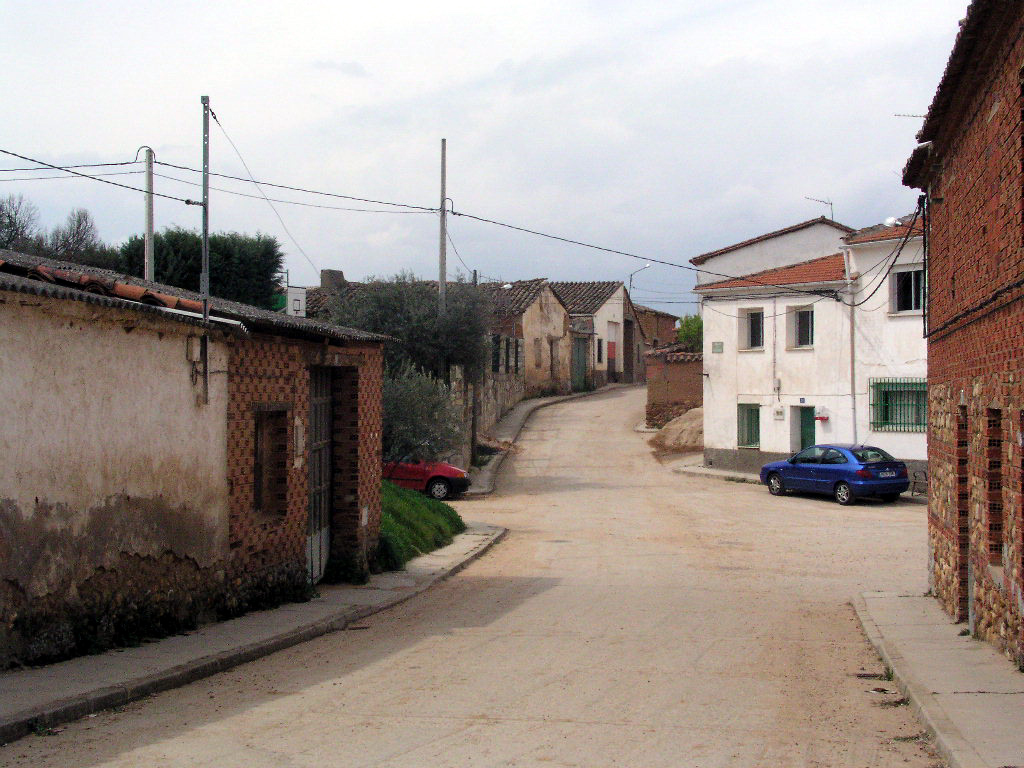

- Coat of arms

- Location within Province of Guadalajara Location within Castilla-La Mancha Location within Spain
- Coordinates: 40°49′18″N 3°15′30″W
- Country: Spain
- Autonomous community: Castile-La Mancha
- Province: Guadalajara
- Municipality: Malaguilla

Area
  - Total: 28 km^{2} (11 sq mi)

Population (2025-01-01)
  - Total: 218
  - Density: 7.8/km^{2} (20/sq mi)
- Time zone: UTC+1 (CET)
  - Summer (DST): UTC+2 (CEST)

Malaguilla is a municipality located in the province of Guadalajara, Castile-La Mancha, Spain. According to the 2004 census (INE), the municipality has a population of 137 inhabitants.
