= Canredondo =

Canredondo, Spain
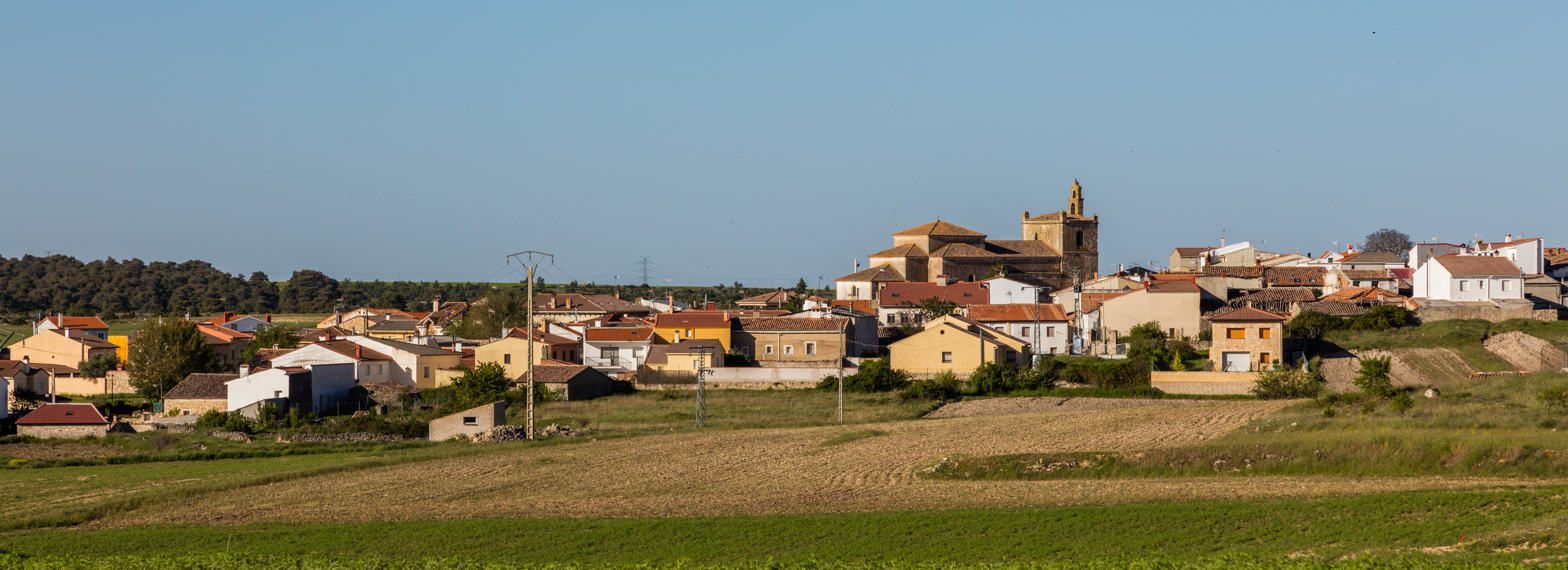

- Location within Province of Guadalajara Location within Castilla-La Mancha Location within Spain
- Coordinates: 40°48′51″N 2°29′34″W
- Country: Spain
- Autonomous community: Castile-La Mancha
- Province: Guadalajara
- Municipality: Canredondo

Area
  - Total: 63 km^{2} (24 sq mi)

Population (2025-01-01)
  - Total: 81
  - Density: 1.3/km^{2} (3.3/sq mi)
- Time zone: UTC+1 (CET)
  - Summer (DST): UTC+2 (CEST)

Canredondo is a municipality located in the province of Guadalajara, Castile-La Mancha, Spain. According to the 2004 census (INE), the municipality has a population of 113 inhabitants.
