= Albares =

Albares, Spain
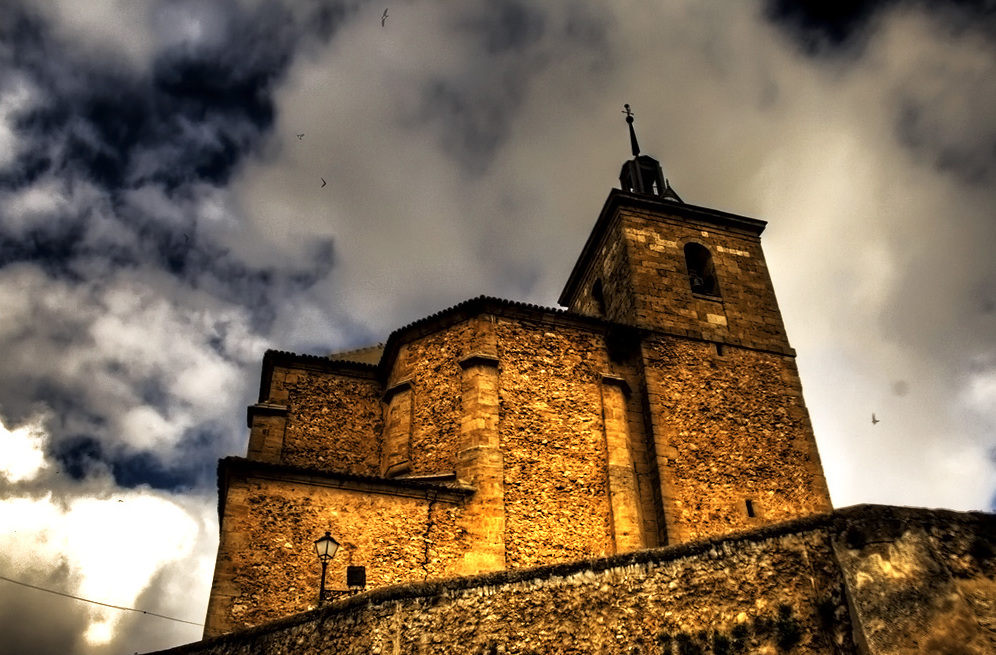

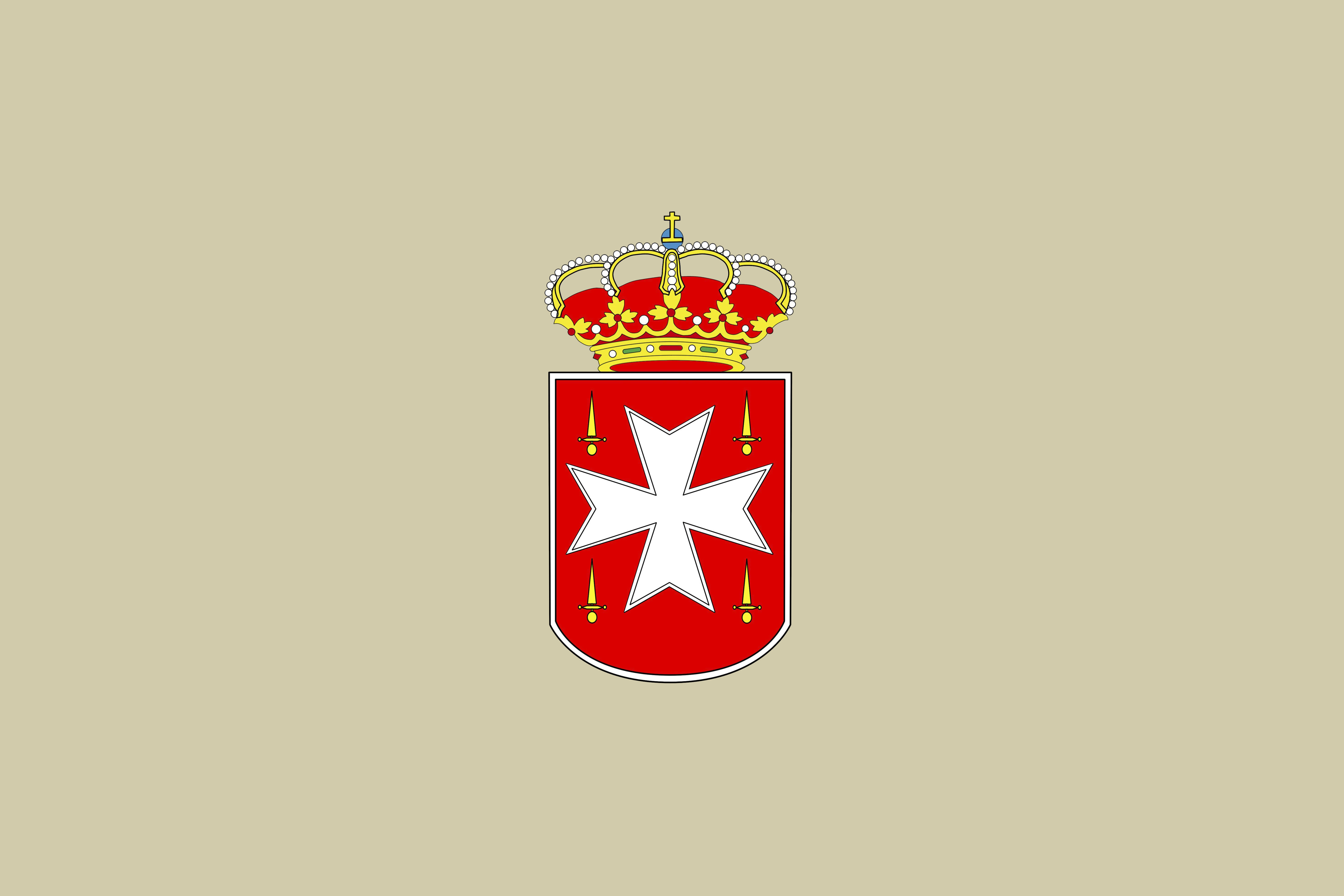
- Flag Coat of arms

- Location within Spain
- Country: Spain
- Autonomous community: Castile-La Mancha
- Province: Guadalajara
- Municipality: Albares

Area
  - Total: 29 km^{2} (11 sq mi)

Population (2025-01-01)
  - Total: 610
  - Density: 21/km^{2} (54/sq mi)
- Time zone: UTC+1 (CET)
  - Summer (DST): UTC+2 (CEST)

Albares is a municipality located in the province of Guadalajara, Castile-La Mancha, Spain. According to the 2004 census (INE), the municipality has a population of 508 inhabitants.
