= Moratilla de los Meleros =

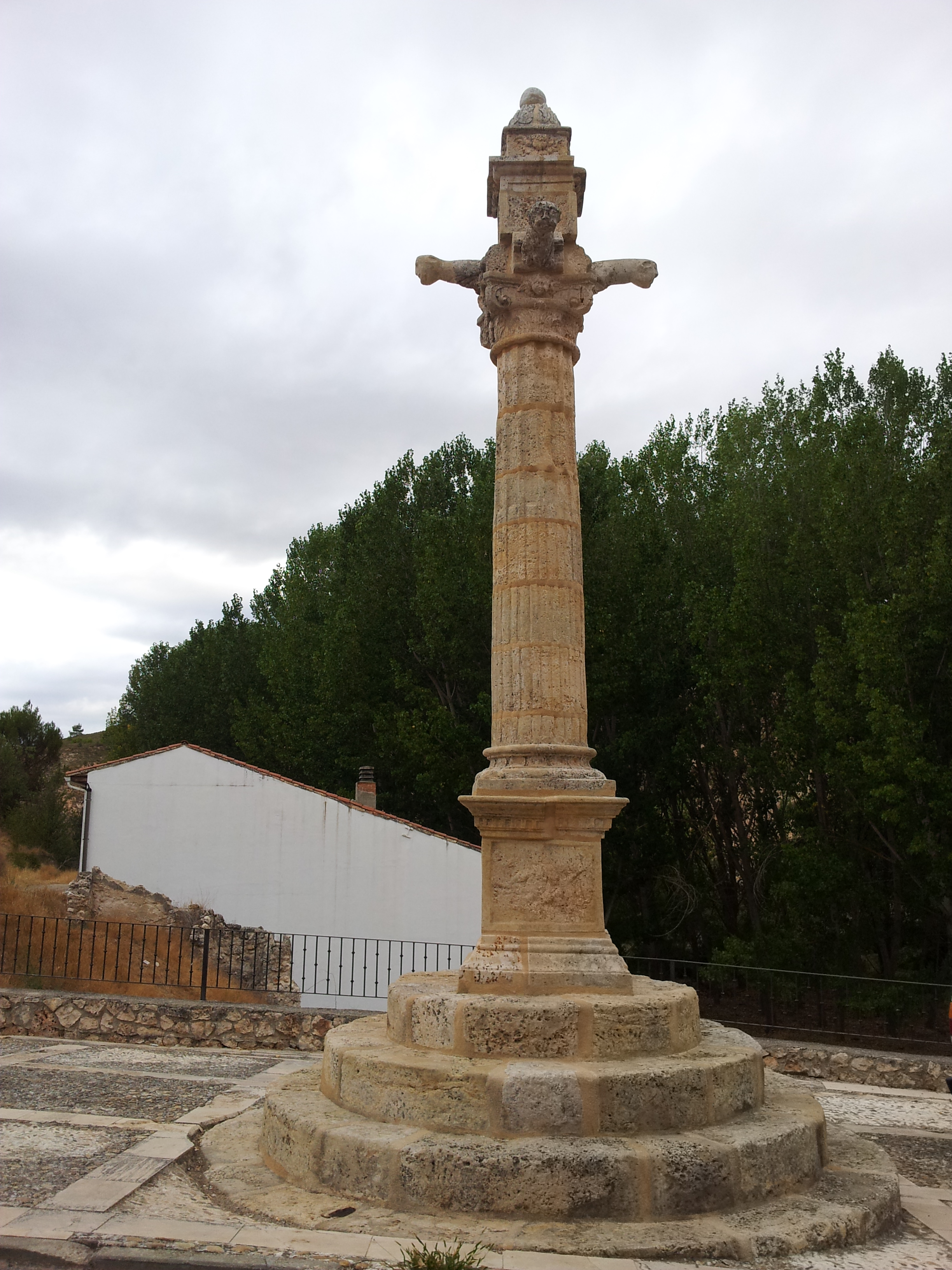

- Flag Coat of arms

- Location within Province of Guadalajara Location within Castilla-La Mancha Location within Spain
- Country: Spain
- Autonomous community: Castile-La Mancha
- Province: Guadalajara
- Municipality: Moratilla de los Meleros

Area
  - Total: 29 km^{2} (11 sq mi)
- Elevation: 842 m (2,762 ft)

Population (2025-01-01)
  - Total: 106
  - Density: 3.7/km^{2} (9.5/sq mi)
- Time zone: UTC+1 (CET)
  - Summer (DST): UTC+2 (CEST)

Moratilla de los Meleros is a municipality located in the province of Guadalajara, Castile-La Mancha, Spain. According to the 2004 census (INE), the municipality has a population of 95 inhabitants.
