= Valfermoso de Tajuña =

Valfermoso de Tajuña, Spain
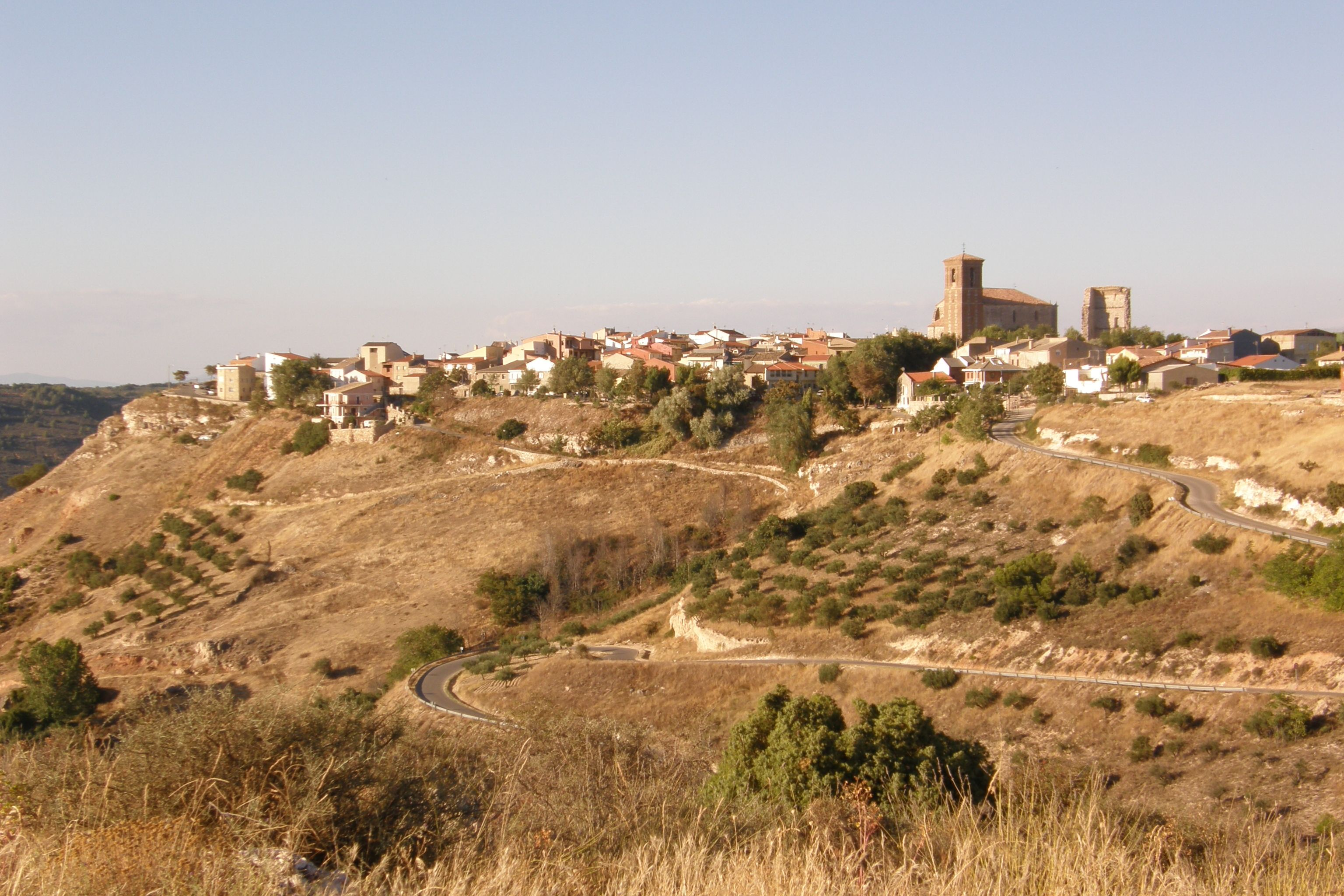

- Coat of arms

- Location within Province of Guadalajara Location within Castilla-La Mancha Location within Spain
- Coordinates: 40°37′16″N 2°57′13″W
- Country: Spain
- Autonomous community: Castile-La Mancha
- Province: Guadalajara
- Municipality: Valfermoso de Tajuña

Area
  - Total: 29 km^{2} (11 sq mi)

Population (2025-01-01)
  - Total: 77
  - Density: 2.7/km^{2} (6.9/sq mi)
- Time zone: UTC+1 (CET)
  - Summer (DST): UTC+2 (CEST)

Valfermoso de Tajuña is a municipality located in the province of Guadalajara, Castile-La Mancha, Spain. According to the 2004 census (INE), the municipality has a population of 86 inhabitants.
