= Arbeteta =

Arbeteta, Spain
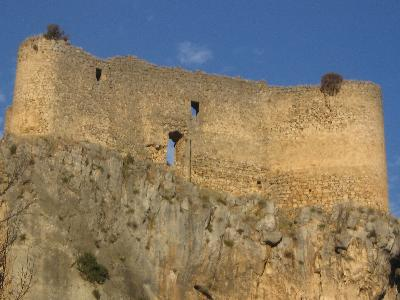
- Remains of the Castle of Arbeteta

- Location within Province of Guadalajara Location within Castilla-La Mancha Location within Spain
- Coordinates: 40°40′14″N 2°24′6″W
- Country: Spain
- Autonomous community: Castile-La Mancha
- Province: Guadalajara
- Municipality: Arbeteta

Area
  - Total: 63 km^{2} (24 sq mi)

Population (2025-01-01)
  - Total: 16
  - Density: 0.25/km^{2} (0.66/sq mi)
- Time zone: UTC+1 (CET)
  - Summer (DST): UTC+2 (CEST)

Arbeteta is a municipality located in the province of Guadalajara, Castile-La Mancha, Spain. According to the 2004 census (INE), the municipality has a population of 59 inhabitants.
