= Valhermoso =

Valhermoso, Spain
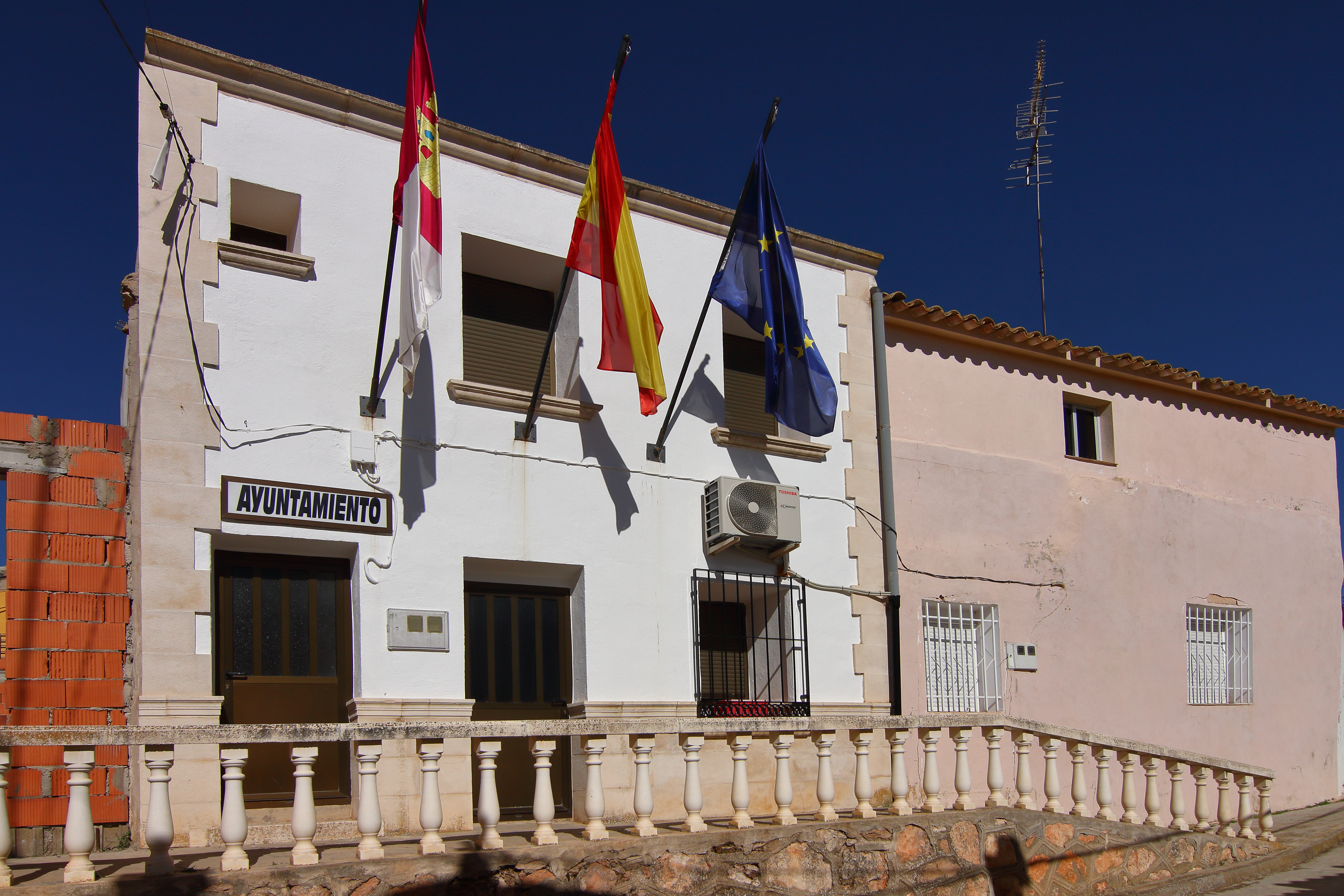
- Town hall

- Location within Province of Guadalajara Location within Castilla-La Mancha Location within Spain
- Coordinates: 40°46′59″N 1°58′00″W
- Country: Spain
- Autonomous community: Castile-La Mancha
- Province: Guadalajara
- Municipality: Valhermoso

Area
  - Total: 29 km^{2} (11 sq mi)

Population (2025-01-01)
  - Total: 15
  - Density: 0.52/km^{2} (1.3/sq mi)
- Time zone: UTC+1 (CET)
  - Summer (DST): UTC+2 (CEST)

Valhermoso is a municipality located in the province of Guadalajara, Castile-La Mancha, Spain. According to the 2004 census (INE), the municipality had a population of 45 inhabitants.
