= Somolinos =

Somolinos, Spain
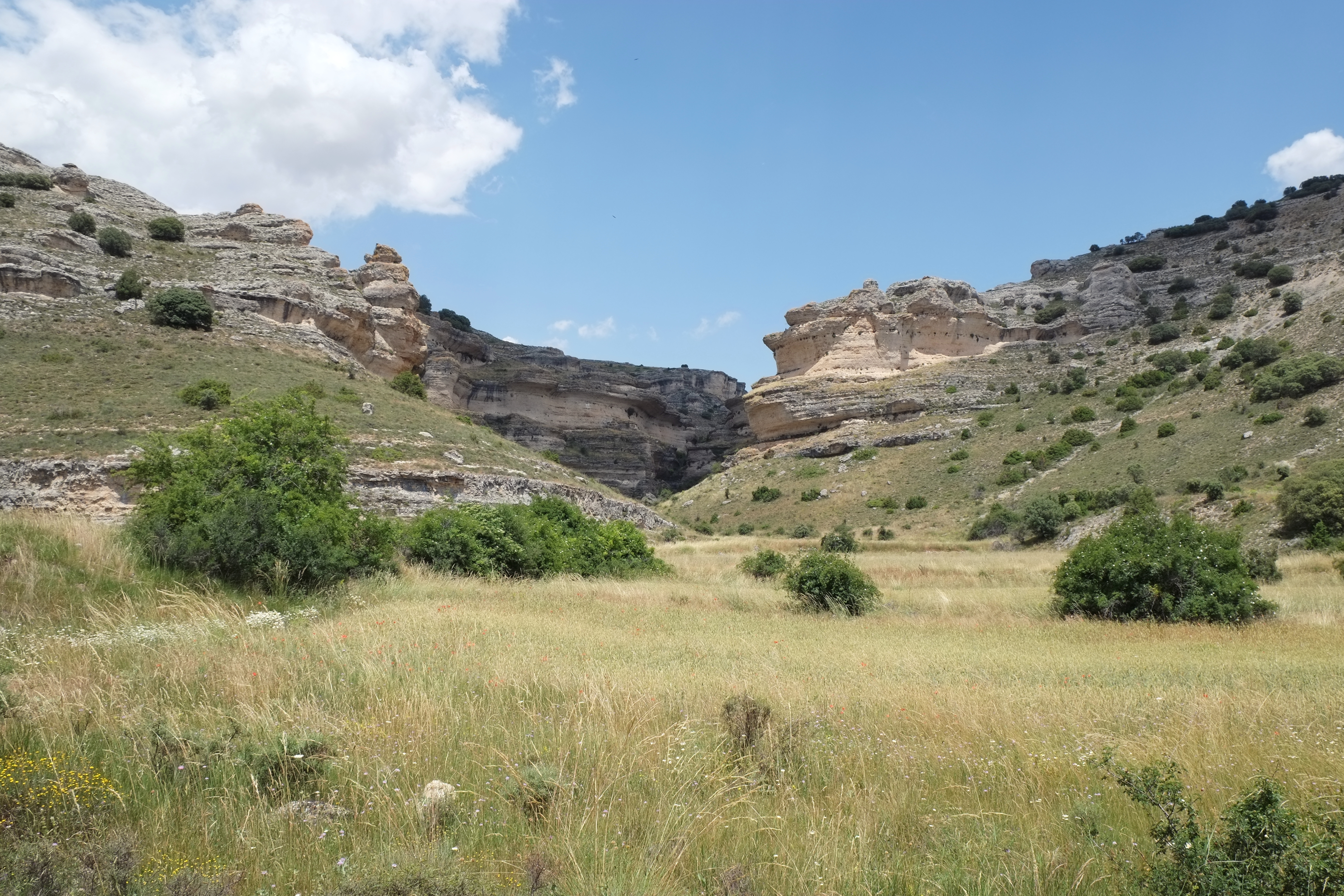

- Location within Province of Guadalajara Location within Castilla-La Mancha Location within Spain
- Coordinates: 41°14′43″N 3°03′28″W
- Country: Spain
- Autonomous community: Castile-La Mancha
- Province: Guadalajara
- Municipality: Somolinos

Population (2025-01-01)
  - Total: 26
- Time zone: UTC+1 (CET)
  - Summer (DST): UTC+2 (CEST)

Somolinos is a Spanish town of the county of Guadalajara and of the community of Castilla-La Mancha.
