= Condemios de Arriba =

Condemios de Arriba, Spain
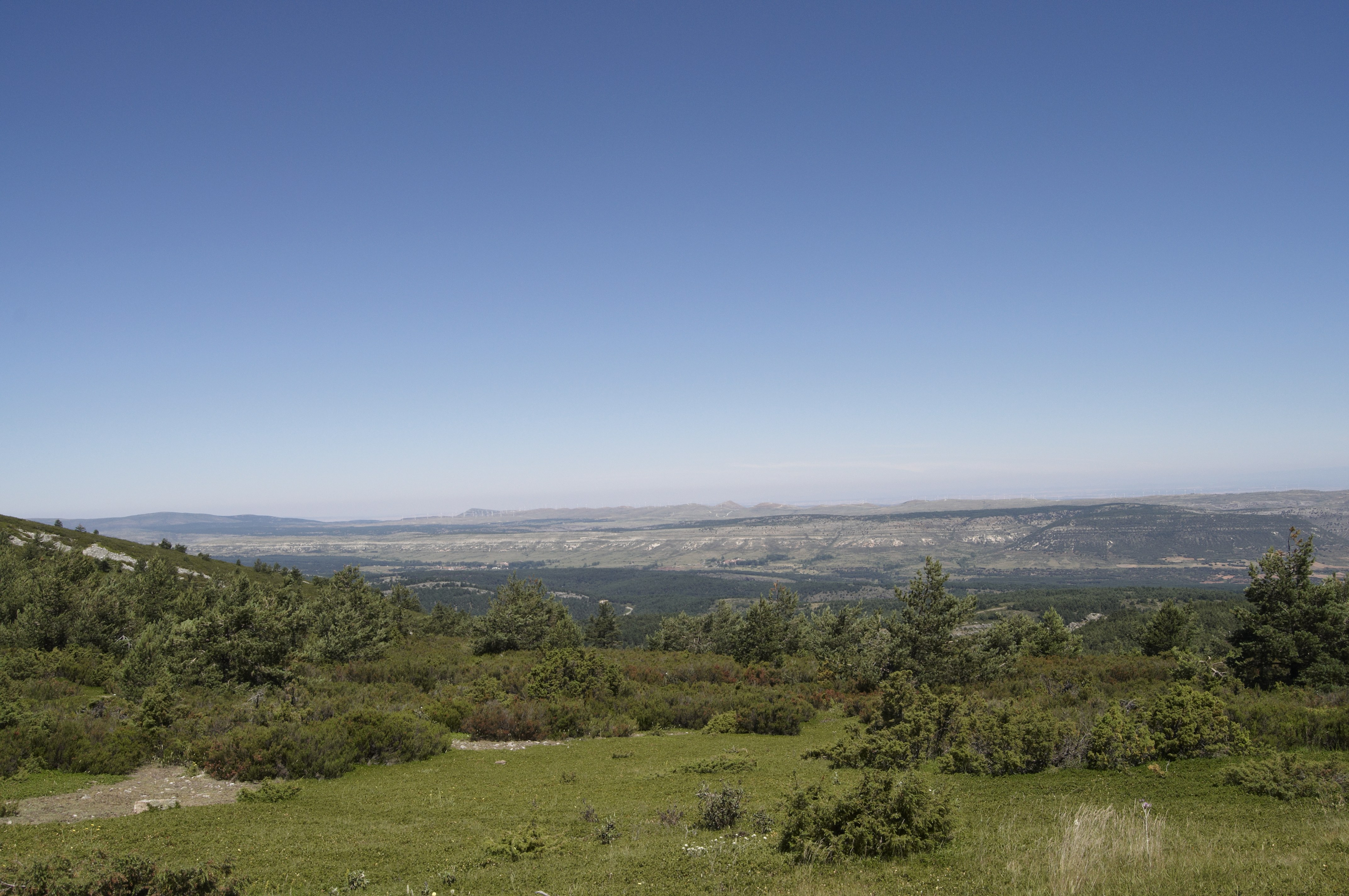

- Flag Coat of arms

- Location within Province of Guadalajara Location within Castilla-La Mancha Location within Spain
- Country: Spain
- Autonomous community: Castile-La Mancha
- Province: Guadalajara
- Municipality: Condemios de Arriba

Area
  - Total: 42 km^{2} (16 sq mi)

Population (2025-01-01)
  - Total: 101
  - Density: 2.4/km^{2} (6.2/sq mi)
- Time zone: UTC+1 (CET)
  - Summer (DST): UTC+2 (CEST)

Condemios de Arriba is a municipality located in the province of Guadalajara, Castile-La Mancha, Spain. According to the 2004 census (INE), the municipality has a population of 181 inhabitants.
