= Province of Guadalajara =

Province of Spain

Province of Guadalajara Provincia de Guadalajara
- Province
- Flag Coat of arms

- Location of the Province of Guadalajara in Spain
- Coordinates: 40°50′N 2°30′W
- Country: Spain
- Autonomous community: Castilla–La Mancha
- Capital: Guadalajara
- Municipalities: 288 (list)

Government
  - Type: Diputación
  - Body: Provincial Deputation of Guadalajara

Area
  - Total: 12,213.17 km^{2} (4,715.53 sq mi)
  - Rank: 17th in Spain
- Highest elevation (Pico del Lobo): 2,273 m (7,457 ft)

Population (2025)
  - Total: 285,839
  - Rank: 42nd in Spain
  - Density: 23.4042/km^{2} (60.6165/sq mi)
- Demonym: Guadalajareño/guadalajareña
- Time zone: UTC+1 (CET)
  - Summer (DST): UTC+2 (CEST)
- ISO 3166 code: ES-GU

The Province of Guadalajara (/ˌɡwɑːdələˈhɑːrə/ GWAH-də-lə-HAR-ə, Spanish: Provincia de Guadalajara, Spanish: [ɡwaðalaˈxaɾa]) is a province in the autonomous community of Castilla–La Mancha in Spain. Its capital is the city of Guadalajara.

It has a population of 285,839 in an area of 12,213.17 square kilometres (4,715.53 sq mi) across its 288 municipalities.

== History ==
=== Prehistory ===
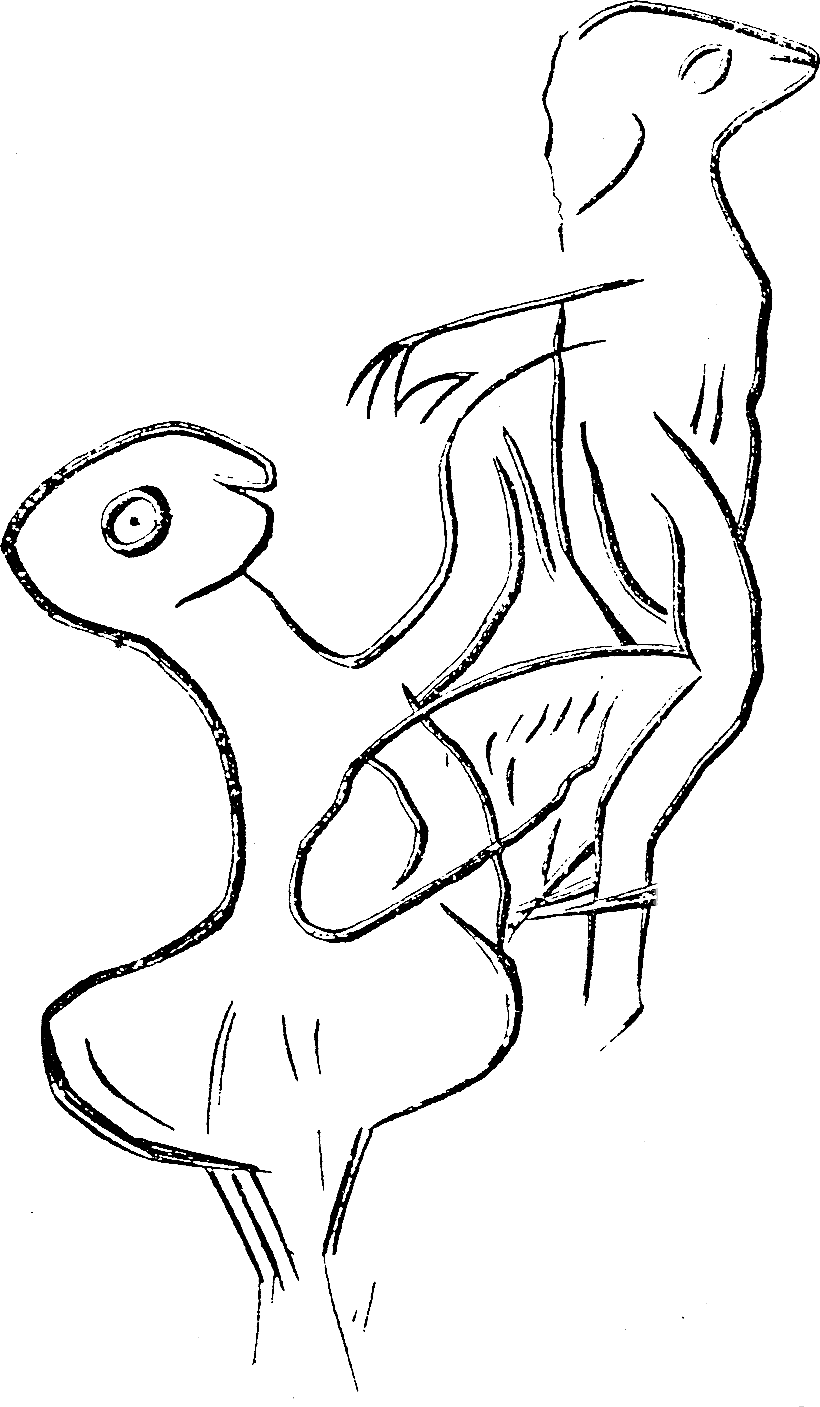
Petroglyph depicting a hierogamy found in the Cueva de los Casares

The province has been inhabited since the Paleolithic as evidenced by stone tools found on the banks of the Henares and Linares rivers. There are also numerous prehistoric cave paintings in the Cueva de los Casares in Riba de Saelices while Megalithic tombs from the 4th millennium B.C. have been found at various sites in the province including Alcolea del Pinar. There are remains of several Bronze Age settlements along the river banks in the area, notably that in Loma del Lomo in Cogolludo as well as a late Bronze Age settlement in Mojares.

=== Celtiberians and Romans ===
The Celtiberians occupied the territory during the late Iron Age between the 6th and 3rd centuries B.C. in Sigüenza, Atienza, and Termancia in the north and further south around Molina. In addition to raising livestock and breeding horses, they created many fortified towns and villages as well as castles. Between 143 and 133 B.C., the Romans initiated their battles to conquer Spain which continued until 94 B.C. They brought agriculture, mining, and commerce to the region, facilitating communications with roads and bridges. The important Roman city was Segontia (Sigüenza), although they built a town wall around Luzaga and public buildings.

=== Middle Ages ===
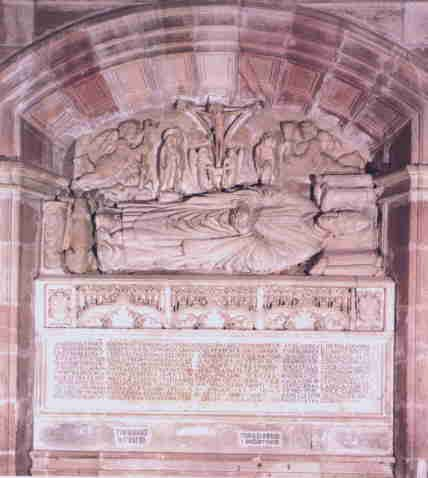
An aquitanian clergy, Bernard of Agen, bishop of Sigüenza, conquered the territory of his diocese.

The Visigoths, with their capital at Toledo, were dominant in the area around the 6th and 7th centuries A.D., bringing Christianity and Germanic law into the region. In 578, King Leovigild founded Recópolis on the River Tagus with a basilica and a palace. The Moors arrived in the area in c. 711, establishing Islamic rule for some four centuries until the early 13th century. Their most important contribution was founding of the current-day provincial capital, Madinat-al-Faray (Guadalajara, from Arabic وادي الحجارة wādi al-ħajāra, "streambed/valley of stones"), which was established by the Berber captain al-Faray, remembered for overcoming the Christians in the 9th century.

The territory now covered by the Province of Guadalajara was part of the Middle March of Al-Andalus. Generally sparsely populated, the most important towns were Atienza, Guadalajara, Jadraque, Hita and Sigüenza. Following the dismemberment of the Caliphate of Córdoba, Toledo gained independence in 1018, reaching its zenith under Yahya-al-Mamun who reigned from 1043 to 1075. Following his death, pressure from King Alfonso VI of León and Castile led to the beginning of Christian conquest of the region in 1085. By the early 12th century, Molina, La Serrania, Sigüenza and the Tagus Valley were retrieved leading to the establishment of the Bishopric of Sigüenza. Under Alfonso VII and Alfonso VIII, the region was repopulated with people from other parts of Castile. With the conquest of Cuenca and Alarcón at the end of the 12th century and the victory at Las Navas de Tolosa in 1212, the entire territory of Guadalajara was again in the hands of the Castilian Christians.

=== Modern age and Renaissance ===
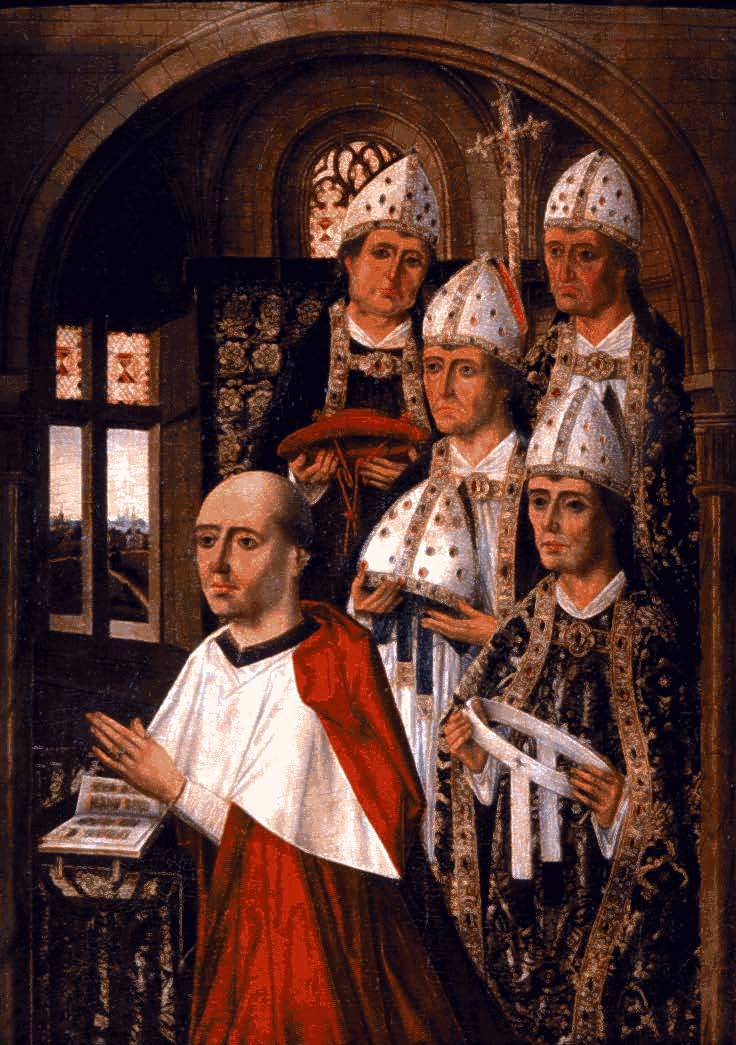
Pedro González de Mendoza, the Cardinal Mendoza.

The modern age began with the Catholic Monarchs, Isabella I of Castile and Ferdinand II of Aragon whose marriage in Valladolid in 1469 united the crowns of Castile and Aragón. They centralized the authority which had developed in the church, the military and the nobility ostensibly to earn income for fighting the infidels by reselling the territories they had gained. In the 16th century, this practice was reinforced by Charles I and Philip II. In Guadalajara, this was particularly the case with areas that had belonged to the military orders of Calatrava and Pastrana. The Mendozas who succeeded in acquiring substantial territories built a fortified palace in Pastrana and extended their influence over Sayatón, Escopete and Albalate.

Under the Mendozas, the city of Guadalajara prospered in the 15th and 16th centuries, attracting writers, historians and philosophers, bringing it the name la Atenas alcarreña (the Alcarrian Athens). Encouraged by the Renaissance, Íñigo López de Mendoza, 1st Marquis of Santillana, (1398–1458) not only built palaces, churches and monasteries but developed a large library of Greek and Latin volumes. In the 16th century, his namesake Íñigo López de Mendoza, 4th Duke of the Infantado, (1493–1566) went on to found an academy in the city, attracting additional writers. Pastrana also prospered during the Renaissance under the leadership of Ruy Gómez de Silva (1516–1573) with the establishment of Latin and choir schools. By the end of the 16th century, the town was famous for its tapestries and its Carmelite convents. With the death of Ruy's widow, Ana de Mendoza in 1592, the nobility moved to Madrid, causing the province to lose the high status it had achieved. While the Spanish Golden Age developed in central Spain during the 17th century, Guadalajara experienced an extended period of decline as the Habsburgs brought about increased centralization.

=== 18th and 19th centuries ===
In the early 18th century, under the War of the Spanish Succession, the city of Guadalajara and the province's main towns all suffered considerable damage. In 1719, a royal textile factory was established in Guadalajara, bringing workers not only from across Spain but from the rest of Europe, especially the Netherlands. The factory prospered throughout the 18th century but was closed in the early 19th century as a result of the War of Spanish Independence. During the War of Independence, French troops caused extensive damage to towns in the province, especially Molina where over 600 buildings were destroyed by fire. When the city of Guadalajara was liberated in 1813, it was left in a devastated and poverty-stricken state. Conditions improved in 1840 with the establishment of the Academy of Military Engineering in the former textile factory. Further military installations followed, culminating at the end of the century in the establishment of the Airship Regiment which led to a range of early exploits and experiments. The finding of silver in the mining district of Hiendelaencina in 1844 lead to a silver rush in the area.

=== Recent history ===
The military facilities continued to provide Guadalajara with financial relief during the first 30 years of the 20th century. The population increased slightly, while further improvements resulted from the influence of the wealthy landowner and politician Count of Romanones who was the representative for Guadalajara from 1886 to 1936. After fighting on the Republican side during the Spanish Civil War, the province was given little attention by the successive governments of Francisco Franco until the late 1950s when plans for moving industrial development out of Madrid began to favour Guadalajara and the Henares corridor. While new industries and improved communications brought prosperity to Guadalajara, Torrejón, Alcalá, Azuqueca and Yunquera de Henares, it also caused drastic decreases in population in rural areas.

From 16 to 20 July 2005 the province was devastated by a forest fire, known as the incendio de Guadalajara. Eleven firefighters died after a blowup. The fire was caused by hikers barbecuing.

== Geography ==
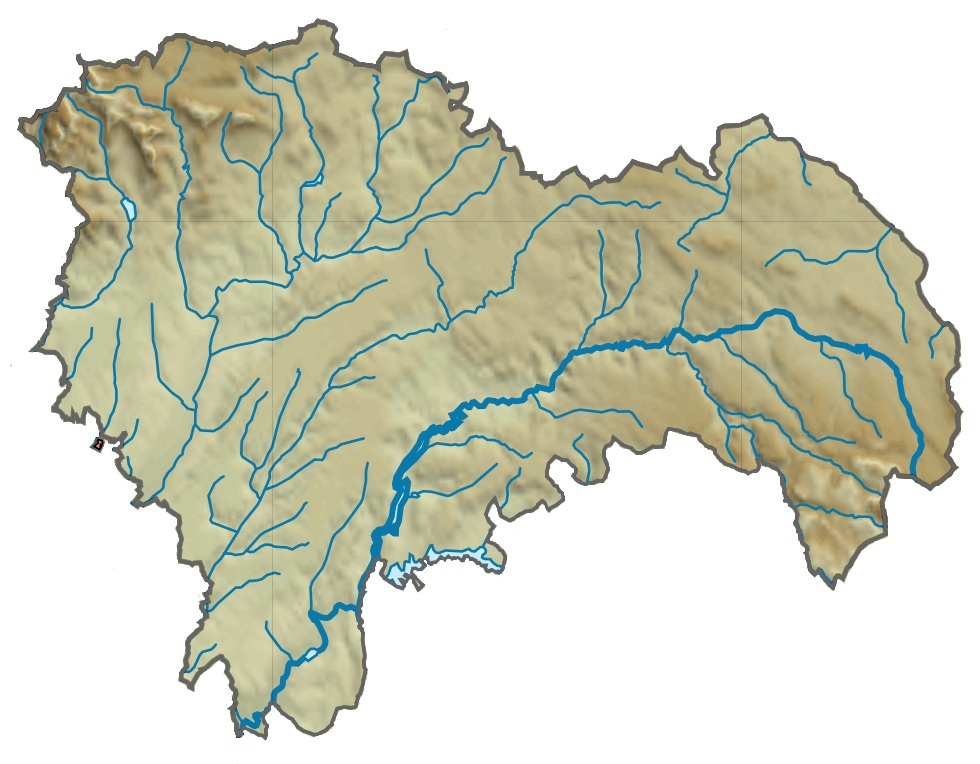
Relief

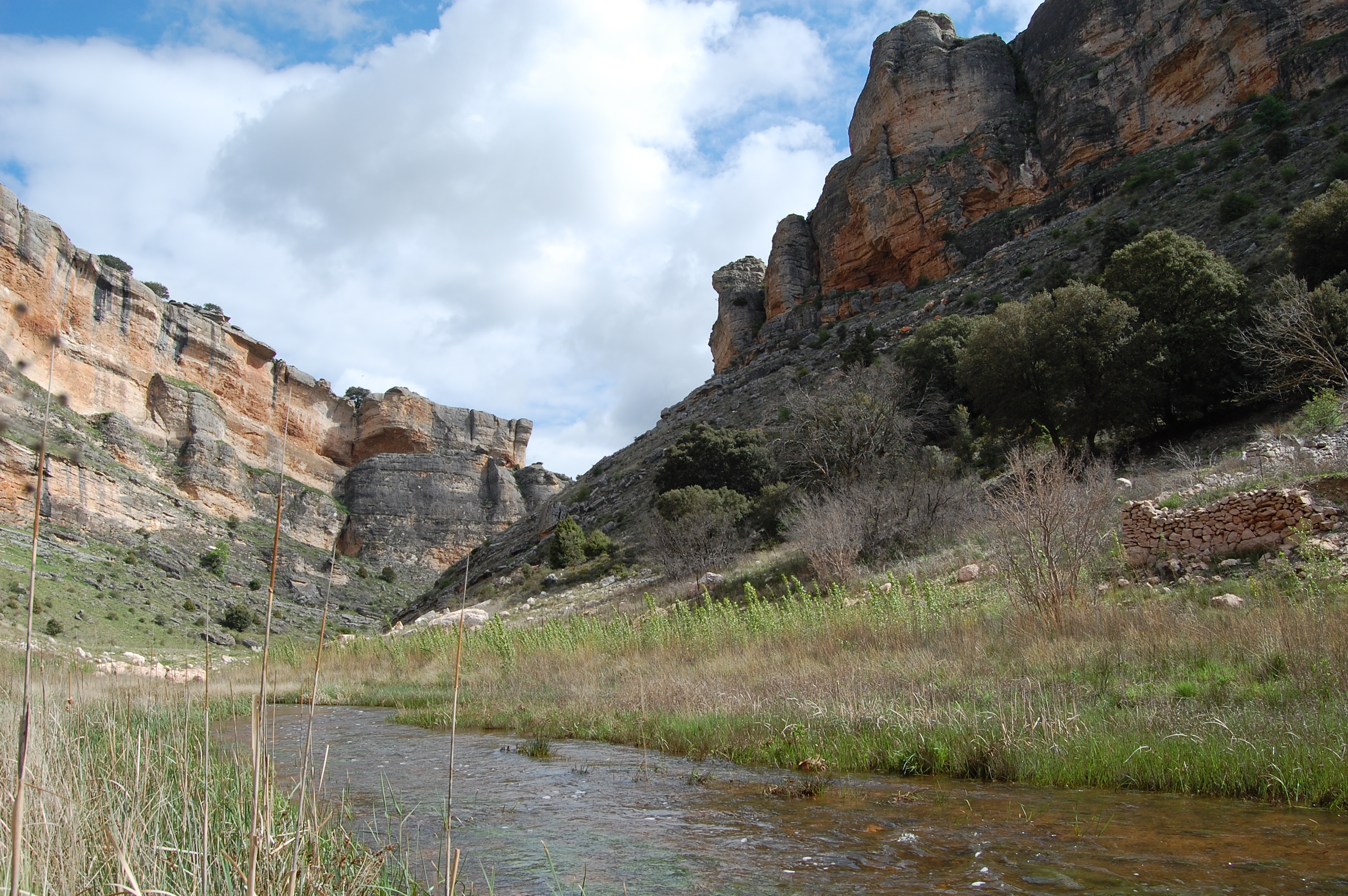
Río Salado Canyon

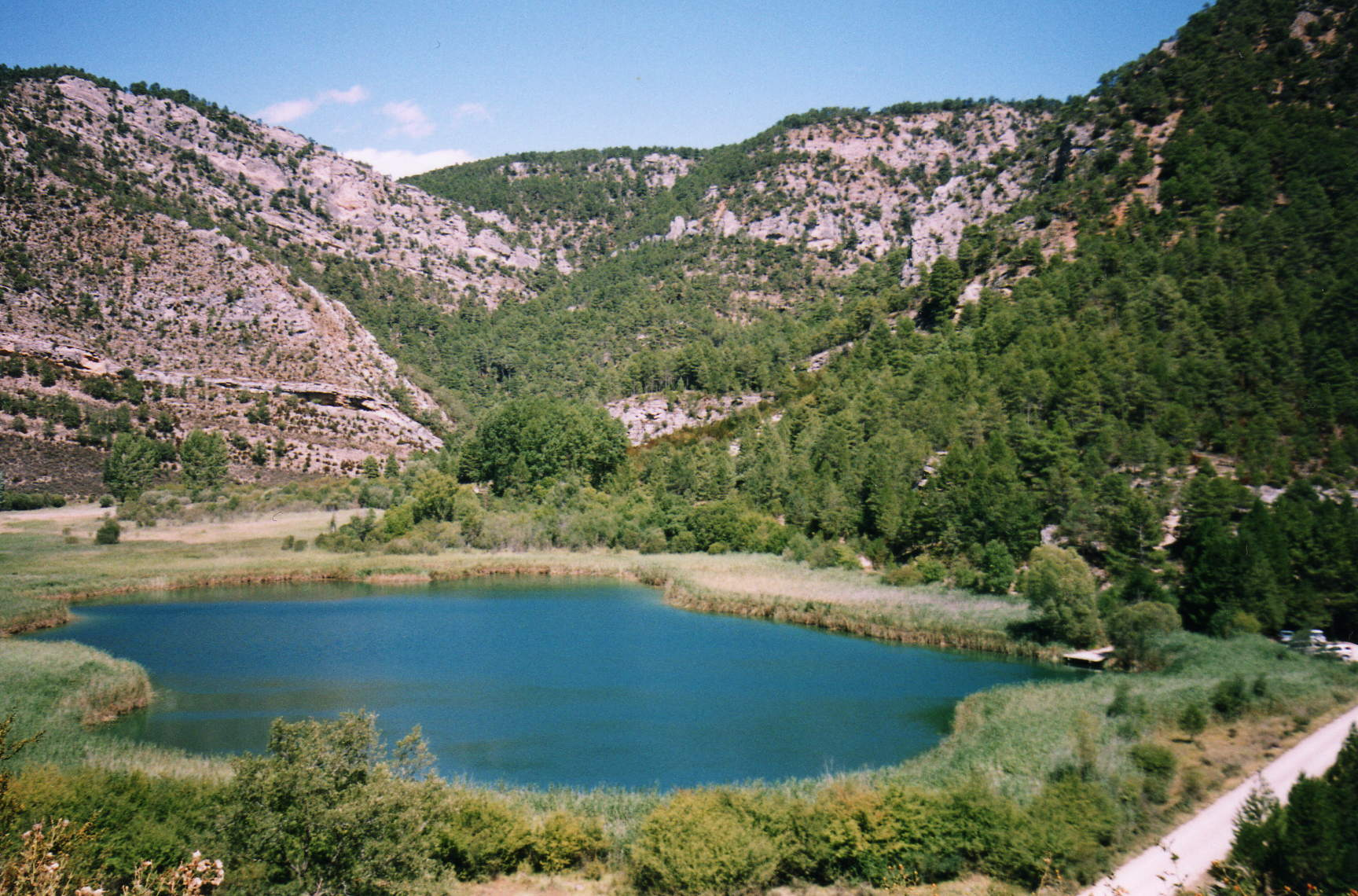
Taravilla Lagoon

The Province of Guadalajara is located in eastern-central Spain, the northeast of the autonomous community of Castile-La Mancha, covering an area of 12.190 km^{2} (4.707 sq mi), 3.42% of the area of Spain. It is bordered by the provinces of Cuenca, Madrid, Segovia, Soria, Zaragoza, and Teruel. Its capital is Guadalajara, where nearly 35% of the province's population lives. There are 288 municipalities in Guadalajara, of which more than three-quarters are villages with populations less than 200. It is located in the centre of the Iberian Peninsula.

Guadalajara is a mountainous region, the eastern side of the province is in the Sistema Ibérico area, while the Sistema Central rises in the western part. The Sistema Ibérico occupies the northeastern part, with the Sierras de Somosierra, Ayllón, Sierra del Ocejón, Alto Rey, Bodera Barahona, and Radona mountains in the vicinity. The mountains are mainly limestone, eroded by the gorges of the rivers, such as the Henares (with a basin area of 3,735 square kilometres), and Jarama (with a basin area of 782 square kilometres) rivers. The Sierra Norte features the three highest points in the province (and the autonomous community of Castilla–La Mancha): Pico del Lobo (2273 m), el Cerrón (2199 m) and Peña Cebollera Vieja or Tres Provincias (2129 m).

The Tagus (Tajo), one of Spain's main rivers, is a major river of the eastern part of the province, forming a basin with an area of 4,686 square kilometres, part of the wider Madrid basin. Also of note is the Tajuña River with an area of 2,015 square kilometres, and the Ebro River, forming a basin area of 996 square kilometres. Other features of note are the Parque Natural del Alto Tajo, Hayedo de Tejera Negra, Lagunas de Puebla de Beleña, Cerros Margosos de Pastrana y Yebra, Cerros Volcánicos de La Miñosa and Prados Húmedos de Torremocha del Pinar.

=== Climate ===
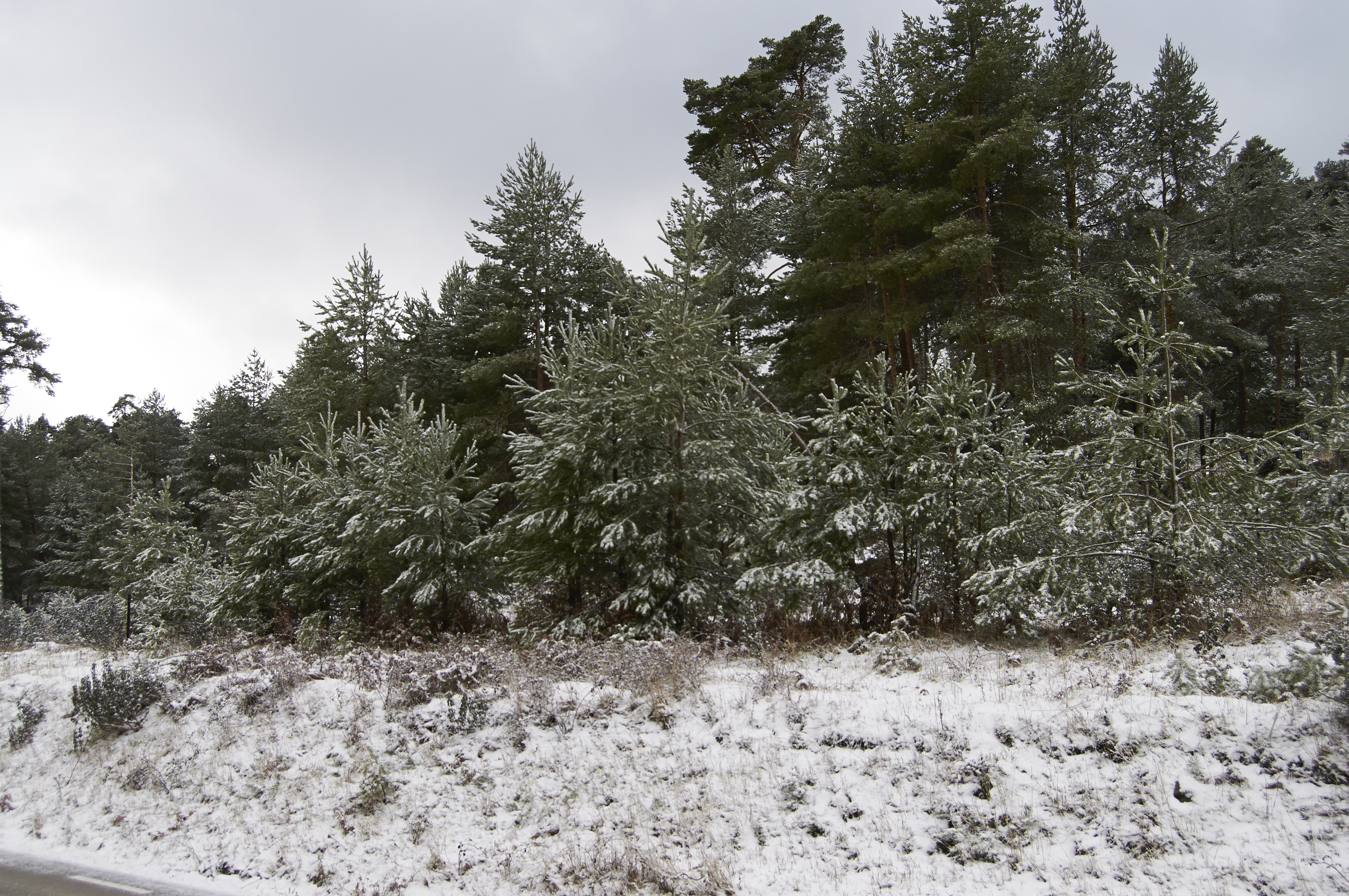
Snowy pinewoods in the Alto Rey mountains

The province, given its wide and varied geographical features, has a range of different weather conditions, although generally it may be classified as a typical Mediterranean Continental climate of the Central Plateau. Long, dry and hot summers, with equally long and harsh winters give way to milder weather conditions in spring and later in autumn. The climatic diversity produces a range of vegetation and ecosystems, and trees such as oaks, juniper, pine, beech, etc. can all be found in the province. The seasonal distribution of rainfall is influenced by the relief, the most rainfall occurring in the mountainous areas of the Sistema Ibérico with between 700 and 900 mm per year, and in the headwaters of the Jarama and Sorbe rivers in the Sierra de Ayllon, with more than 800 mm. The Henares and Tajuña valleys, and the northern area of moorland in Sigüenza have less than 600 mm annually on average, and in some areas such as the Molina moorlands, bordering the provinces of Zaragoza and Teruel, rainfall may be below 400 mm.

== Comarcas ==
The province has the comarcas of La Alcarria, La Campiña, La Serranía and Señorío de Molina-Alto Tajo.

== Municipalities ==
The province has 288 municipalities:

- Abánades
- Ablanque
- Adobes
- Alaminos
- Alarilla
- Albalate de Zorita
- Albares
- Albendiego
- Alcocer
- Alcolea de las Peñas
- Alcolea del Pinar
- Alcoroches
- Aldeanueva de Guadalajara
- Algar de Mesa
- Algora
- Alhóndiga
- Alique
- Almadrones
- Almoguera
- Almonacid de Zorita
- Alocén
- Alovera
- Alustante
- Angón
- Anguita
- Anquela del Ducado
- Anquela del Pedregal
- Aranzueque
- Arbancón
- Arbeteta
- Argecilla
- Armallones
- Armuña de Tajuña
- Arroyo de las Fraguas
- Atanzón
- Atienza
- Auñón
- Azuqueca de Henares
- Baides
- Baños de Tajo
- Bañuelos
- Barriopedro
- Berninches
- Brihuega
- Budia
- Bujalaro
- Bustares
- Cabanillas del Campo
- Campillo de Dueñas
- Campillo de Ranas
- Campisábalos
- Cañizar
- Canredondo
- Cantalojas
- Casa de Uceda
- Casas de San Galindo
- Caspueñas
- Castejón de Henares
- Castellar de la Muela
- Castilforte
- Castilnuevo
- Cendejas de Enmedio
- Cendejas de la Torre
- Centenera
- Checa
- Chequilla
- Chillarón del Rey
- Chiloeches
- Cifuentes
- Cincovillas
- Ciruelas
- Ciruelos del Pinar
- Cobeta
- Cogollor
- Cogolludo
- Condemios de Abajo
- Condemios de Arriba
- Congostrina
- Copernal
- Corduente
- Driebes
- Durón
- El Cardoso de la Sierra
- El Casar
- El Cubillo de Uceda
- El Olivar
- El Ordial
- El Pedregal
- El Pobo de Dueñas
- El Recuenco
- El Sotillo
- Embid
- Escamilla
- Escariche
- Escopete
- Espinosa de Henares
- Esplegares
- Establés
- Estriégana
- Fontanar
- Fuembellida
- Fuencemillán
- Fuentelahiguera de Albatages
- Fuentelencina
- Fuentelsaz
- Fuentelviejo
- Fuentenovilla
- Gajanejos
- Galápagos
- Galve de Sorbe
- Gascueña de Bornova
- Henche
- Heras de Ayuso
- Herrería
- Hiendelaencina
- Hijes
- Hita
- Hombrados
- Hontoba
- Horche
- Hortezuela de Océn
- Huérmeces del Cerro
- Huertahernando
- Hueva
- Humanes
- Illana
- Iniéstola
- Irueste
- Jadraque
- Jirueque
- La Bodera
- La Huerce
- La Mierla
- La Miñosa
- La Olmeda de Jadraque
- La Toba
- La Yunta
- Las Inviernas
- Las Navas de Jadraque
- Ledanca
- Loranca de Tajuña
- Lupiana
- Luzaga
- Luzón
- Majaelrayo
- Málaga del Fresno
- Malaguilla
- Mandayona
- Mantiel
- Maranchón
- Marchamalo
- Masegoso de Tajuña
- Matarrubia
- Matillas
- Mazarete
- Mazuecos
- Medranda
- Megina
- Membrillera
- Miedes de Atienza
- Millana
- Milmarcos
- Mirabueno
- Miralrío
- Mochales
- Mohernando
- Molina de Aragón
- Monasterio
- Mondéjar
- Montarrón
- Moratilla de los Meleros
- Morenilla
- Muduex
- Negredo
- Ocentejo
- Olmeda de Cobeta
- Orea
- Pálmaces de Jadraque
- Pardos
- Paredes de Sigüenza
- Pareja
- Pastrana
- Guadalajara
- Peñalén
- Peñalver
- Peralejos de las Truchas
- Peralveche
- Pinilla de Jadraque
- Pinilla de Molina
- Pioz
- Piqueras
- Poveda de la Sierra
- Pozo de Almoguera
- Pozo de Guadalajara
- Prádena de Atienza
- Prados Redondos
- Puebla de Beleña
- Puebla de Valles
- Quer
- Rebollosa de Jadraque
- Renera
- Retiendas
- Riba de Saelices
- Rillo de Gallo
- Riofrío del Llano
- Robledillo de Mohernando
- Robledo de Corpes
- Romanillos de Atienza
- Romanones
- Rueda de la Sierra
- Sacecorbo
- Sacedón
- Saelices de la Sal
- Salmerón
- San Andrés del Congosto
- San Andrés del Rey
- Santiuste
- Saúca
- Sayatón
- Selas
- Semillas
- Setiles
- Sienes
- Sigüenza
- Solanillos del Extremo
- Somolinos
- Sotodosos
- Tamajón
- Taragudo
- Taravilla
- Tartanedo
- Tendilla
- Terzaga
- Tierzo
- Tordellego
- Tordelrábano
- Tordesilos
- Torija
- Torre del Burgo
- Torrecuadrada de Molina
- Torrecuadradilla
- Torrejón del Rey
- Torremocha de Jadraque
- Torremocha del Campo
- Torremocha del Pinar
- Torremochuela
- Torrubia
- Tórtola de Henares
- Tortuera
- Tortuero
- Traíd
- Trijueque
- Trillo
- Uceda
- Ujados
- Utande
- Valdarachas
- Valdearenas
- Valdeavellano
- Valdeaveruelo
- Valdeconcha
- Valdegrudas
- Valdelcubo
- Valdenuño Fernández
- Valdepeñas de la Sierra
- Valderrebollo
- Valdesotos
- Valfermoso de Tajuña
- Valhermoso
- Valtablado del Río
- Valverde de los Arroyos
- Viana de Jadraque
- Villanueva de Alcorón
- Villanueva de Argecilla
- Villanueva de la Torre
- Villares de Jadraque
- Villaseca de Henares
- Villaseca de Uceda
- Villel de Mesa
- Viñuelas
- Yebes
- Yebra
- Yélamos de Abajo
- Yélamos de Arriba
- Yunquera de Henares
- Zaorejas
- Zarzuela de Jadraque
- Zorita de los Canes

== Demographics ==
Historical population
Year	Pop.	±%
1842	155,660	—
1857	199,088	+27.9%
1877	203,017	+2.0%
1887	204,984	+1.0%
1900	203,655	−0.6%
1910	213,076	+4.6%
1920	211,193	−0.9%
1930	213,284	+1.0%
1940	211,561	−0.8%
1950	208,652	−1.4%
1960	189,585	−9.1%
1970	149,804	−21.0%
1981	143,473	−4.2%
1991	145,593	+1.5%
2001	174,999	+20.2%
2011	257,442	+47.1%
2021	265,969	+3.3%
Source: INE

As of 2025, the population is 285,839, of which 50.8% are male, and 49.2% are female. Minors make up 18.0% of the population, and seniors make up 17.0%.

=== Immigration ===
As of 2025, immigrants make up 21.9% of the population. The 5 largest foreign countries of birth are Romania, Morocco, Colombia, Peru, and Venezuela.

Foreign-born population (2025)
Country of birth	Population
Romania	9,873
Morocco	8,137
Colombia	7,836
Peru	6,138
Venezuela	5,289
Ecuador	2,835
Dominican Republic	1,936
Bulgaria	1,715
Argentina	1,656
Cuba	1,374
Algeria	1,339
Honduras	965
Ukraine	933
Brazil	921
Nigeria	742

== Landmarks ==
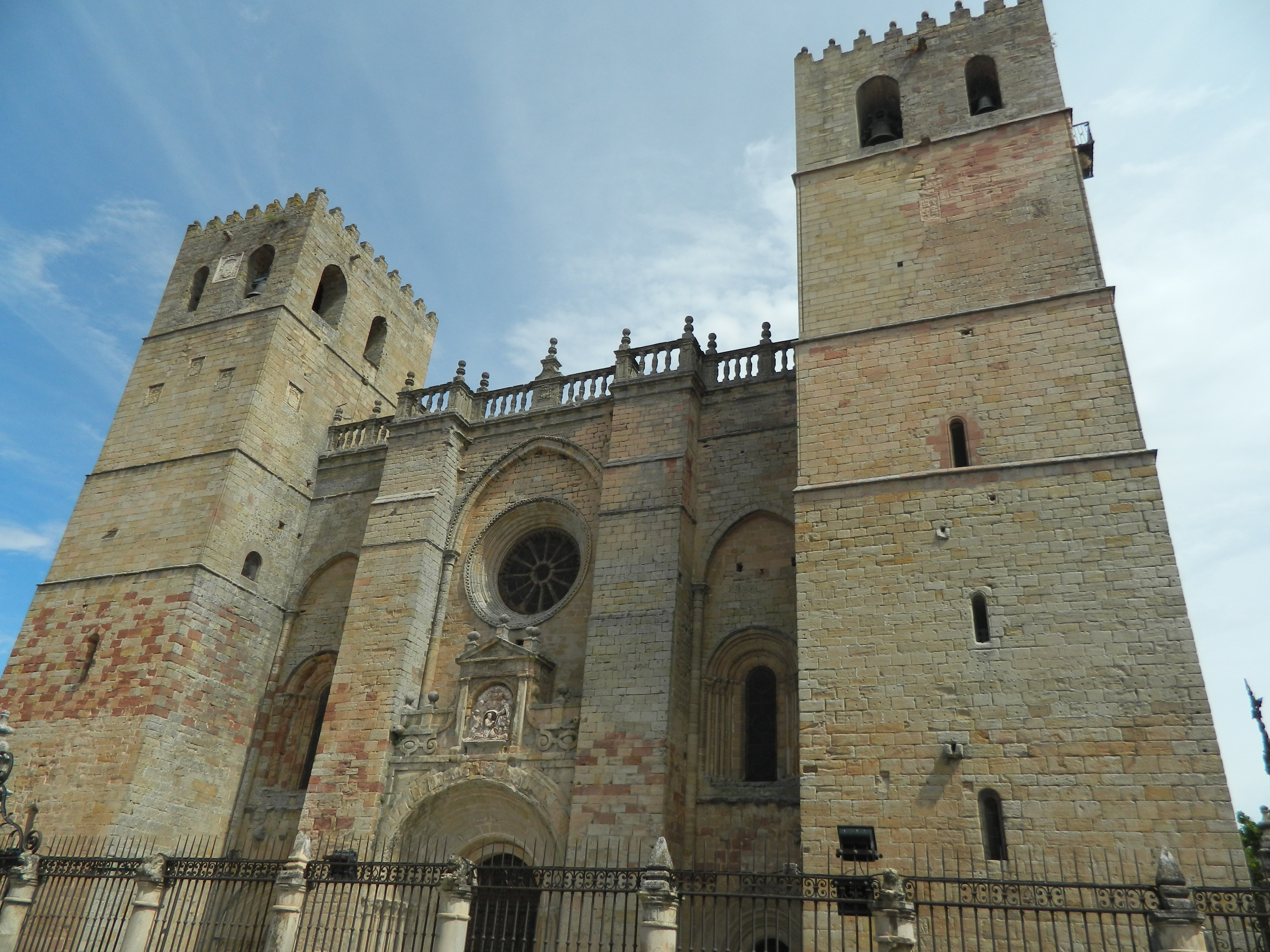
Cathedral of Sigüenza, built in romanesque and gothic styles.

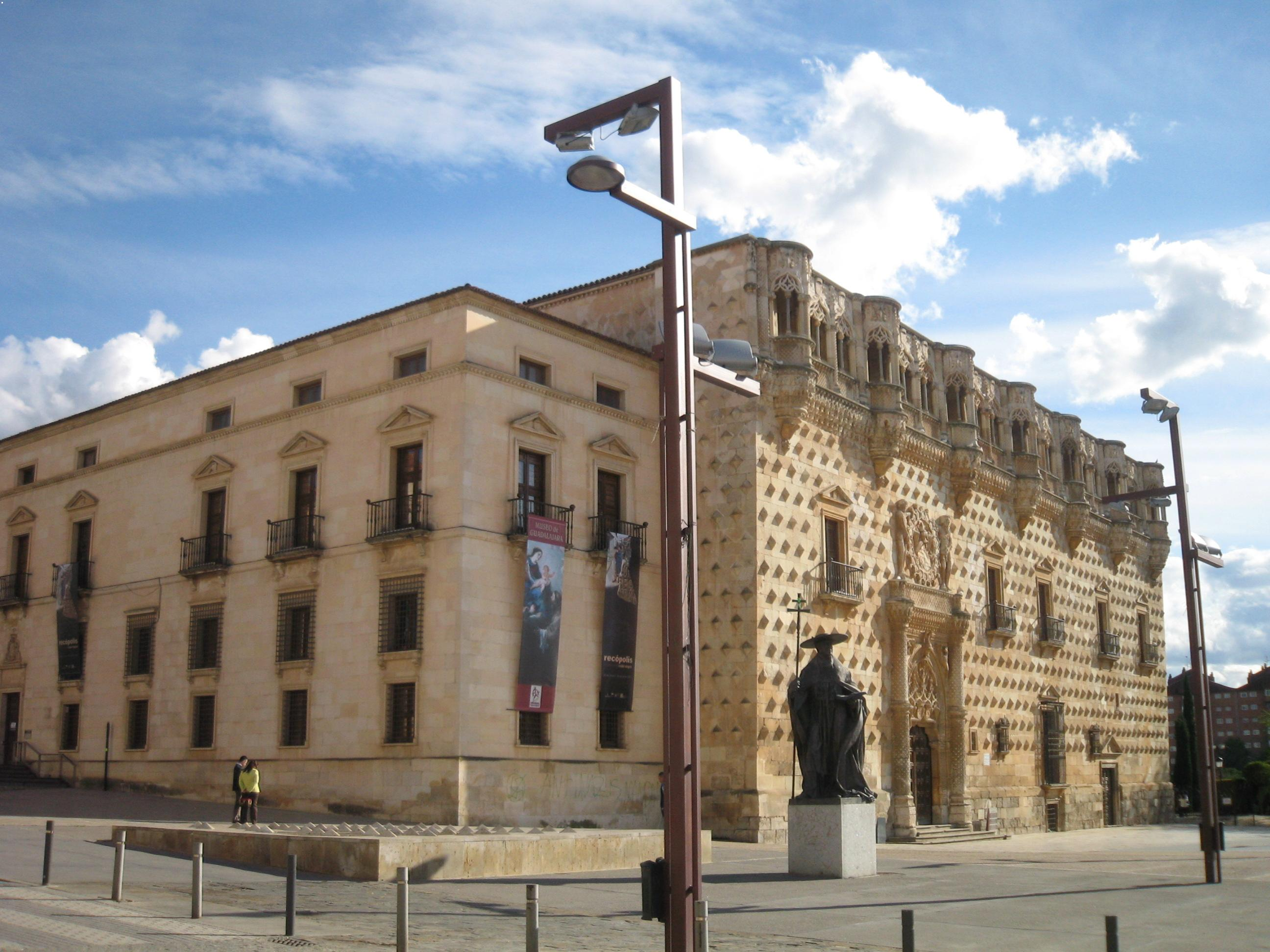
Façade of the Palace of El Infantado

Landmarks of note include the castle and walls of Palazuelos, Palace of El Infantado, Ducal Palace of Pastrana, Palace of the Dukes of Medinaceli (Cogolludo), Sigüenza Cathedral, Cueva de los Casares in La Riba de Saelices and Castillo de Pioz. The Co-cathedral of Santa María de la Fuente la Mayor in the city of Guadalajara was declared a Bien de Interés Cultural site in 1941.

=== Castles ===
Standing high on a rock, Atienza Castle can be seen from miles around. It frequently changed hands between the Moors and the Christians until it was finally retaken by Alfonso VI in 1085. With foundations dating back to the 5th century, Sigüenza Castle was extended by the Moors and retaken for the Christians by Bernard of Agen in 1123. In the late 18th century, Bishop Juan Díaz de la Guerra changed the appearance of the fortress into that of an episcopal palace but during the War of Spanish Independence it was taken by the French who seriously damaged it. In the 1830s, it was devastated by fire and had to be abandoned. After being fully restored, the castle was opened as a Parador luxury hotel in 1976. Decorated with banners and suits of armour, the huge lounge is the castle's original dining room.

The Castle of Molina de Aragón is located on a hill commanding the surrounding valley, and is formed by an external line of walls with four gates and six towers of which four are currently in good condition. Originally, the line of towers included a village. The castle originated as a Moorish fortress (10th-11th century), built over a pre-existing Celtiberian castle. The fortress was used as residence of the lords of the taifa of Molina. El Cid resided here when he was exiled from Castile. In 1129 it was conquered from the Moors by Alfonso I of Aragon.

The impressive Torija Castle was built in the 11th century by the Knights Templar. Constructed of Alcarria limestone, the rectangular structure has three round towers and a cylindrical keep. In 1445, it was taken by the Navarran captain Juan de Puelles and was subsequently owned by Cardinal Pedro González de Mendoza (1428–1495). In the 19th century, it was occupied by the French under General Hugo, the father of Victor Hugo, until it was taken and destroyed by El Empecinado. Its restoration was completed in 1962.

Jadraque Castle overlooking the River Henares, sometimes known as the Castle of El Cid, has four round towers and one rectangular tower. Today's perfectly proportioned palatial structure was built by Juan Guas in the 15th century but it stands on the site of a fortress used for centuries by the Moors. The outer fabric has been substantially restored but the interior is still in a state of ruin.

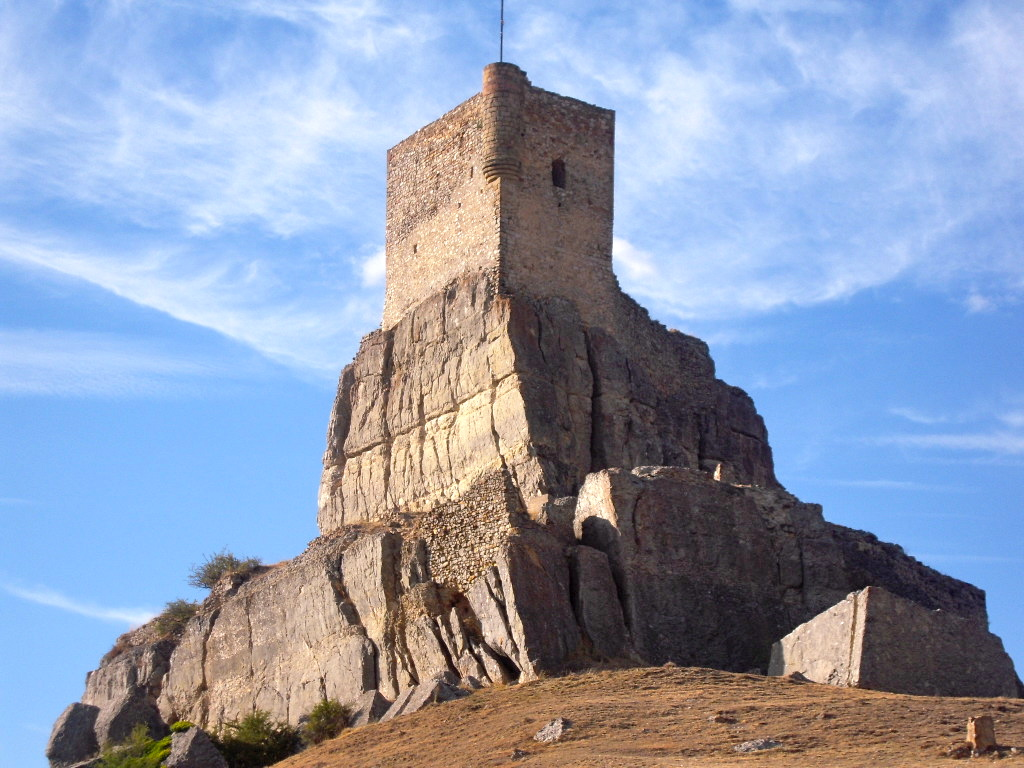
Castle of Atienza

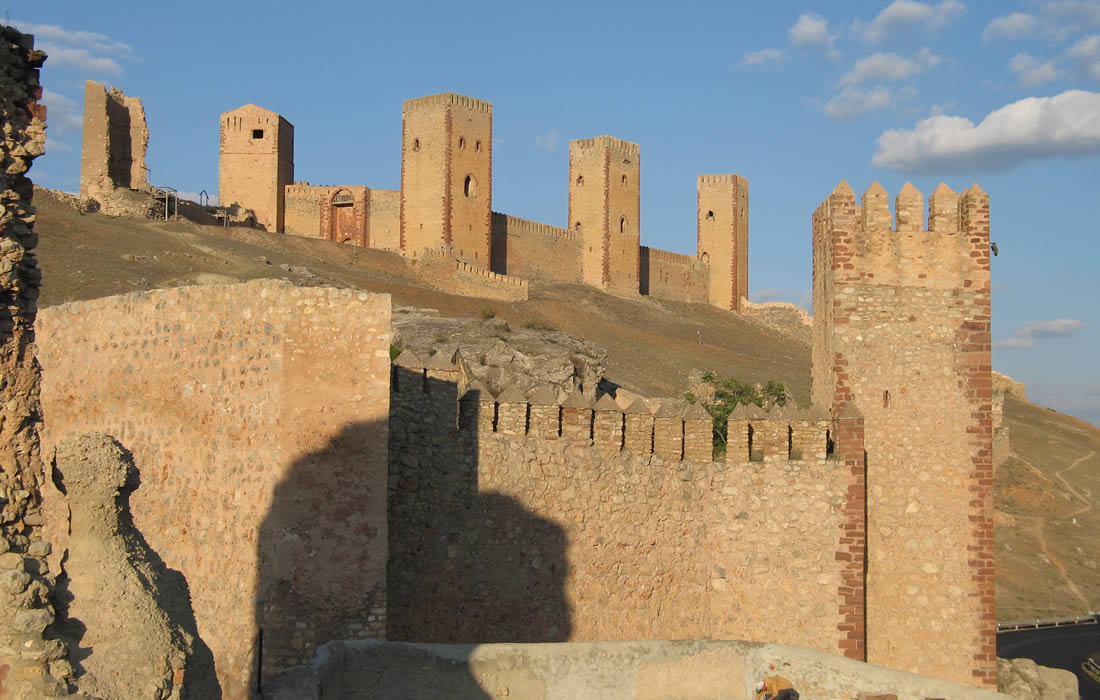
Castle of Molina de Aragón
