= Las Inviernas =

Las Inviernas, Spain
- Location within Province of Guadalajara Location within Castilla-La Mancha Location within Spain
- Country: Spain
- Autonomous community: Castile-La Mancha
- Province: Guadalajara
- Municipality: Las Inviernas

Area
  - Total: 34 km^{2} (13 sq mi)

Population (2025-01-01)
  - Total: 60
  - Density: 1.8/km^{2} (4.6/sq mi)
- Time zone: UTC+1 (CET)
  - Summer (DST): UTC+2 (CEST)

Las Inviernas (Spanish pronunciation: [las imˈbjeɾ.nas]) is a municipality located in the province of Guadalajara, Castile-La Mancha, Spain. According to the 2004 census (INE), the municipality has a population of 102 inhabitants.
