= Valdelcubo =

Valdelcubo Valdelcubo
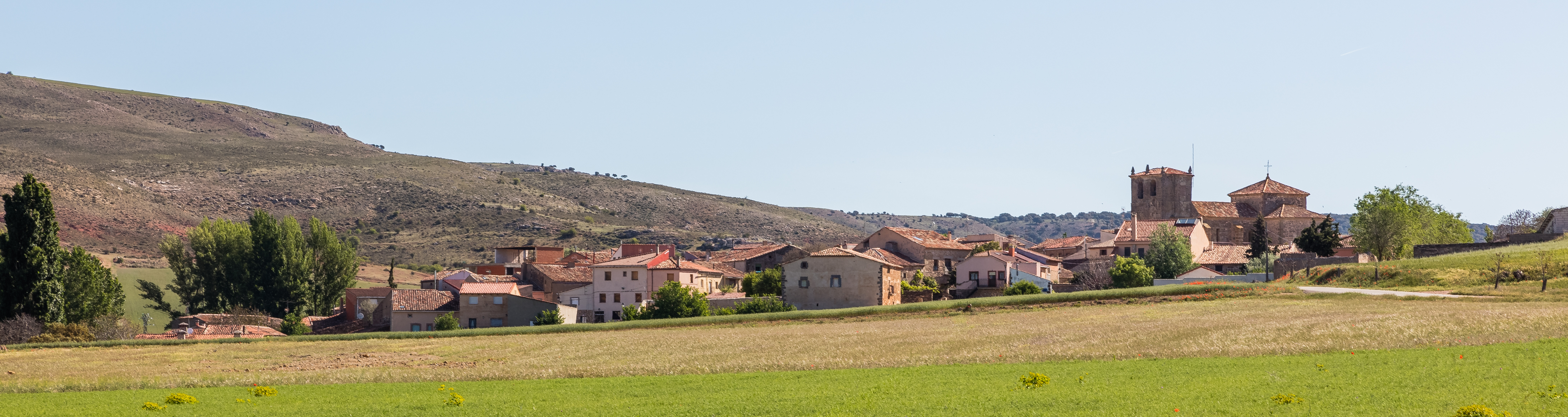

- Location within Province of Guadalajara Location within Castilla-La Mancha Location within Spain
- Coordinates: 41°13′38″N 2°40′27″W
- Country: Spain
- Autonomous community: Castile-La Mancha
- Province: Guadalajara
- Judicial district: Sigüenza

Area
  - Total: 13.83 km^{2} (5.34 sq mi)
- Elevation: 1,077 m (3,533 ft)

Population (2025)
  - Total: 42
  - Density: 3.0/km^{2} (7.9/sq mi)
- Time zone: UTC+1 (CET)
  - Summer (DST): UTC+2 (CEST)
- Postal code: 19269
- Area code: +34 949

Valdelcubo is a municipality and small town located in the province of Guadalajara, in the autonomous community of Castile-La Mancha, Spain. According to the National Statistics Institute (INE), the municipality has a population of 42 inhabitants.

== Geography ==
Valdelcubo is situated in the northern part of the province of Guadalajara, at an altitude of 1,077 metres above sea level. The municipality covers an area of 13.83 km². It is part of the comarca of Sierra Norte de Guadalajara and lies within the area of influence of the Ayllón massif.

The municipality borders the towns of Sienes, Tobes, Querencia and Alpanseque, and lies between Paredes de Sigüenza and Sigüenza.

The main natural resource of the municipality is the riparian environment along the Arroyo del Berral (Berral stream). The surrounding landscape is dominated by pine and holm oak forests. The area is also part of the Parque Natural de la Sierra Norte de Guadalajara, offering access to waymarked hiking trails connecting to the Sierra de Pela and the Ayllón massif.

The town forms part of Stage 10 of the Ruta de Don Quijote (Don Quixote Route), which passes through this area as a mandatory stop on the literary journey of Don Quixote to Barcelona. In Valdelcubo, the branches coming from Riba de Santiuste and Alcuneza converge to the south, and from here the Route heads towards Atienza, passing through Rienda and Tordelrábano. There is an official rest point of the Route in the town.

== History ==
The name Valdelcubo is traditionally interpreted as deriving from valle (valley) and cubo (tower or tub), referring to the fertile valley and a watchtower that once monitored the road between the Tagus, Duero and Ebro river basins, as well as the historic salt routes of the region.

By the mid-19th century, the town had a population of 238 inhabitants and a total of 55 houses. The locality is described in volume XV of Pascual Madoz's Diccionario geográfico-estadístico-histórico de España y sus posesiones de Ultramar (1849), which records its parish church dedicated to Santiago el Mayor (Saint James the Greater), a primary school with 20 pupils, seven flour mills, and production of cereals, legumes, potatoes, vegetables and fruit, as well as livestock farming and fishing of crayfish and barbel in the Salado stream.

Since the mid-20th century, Valdelcubo has experienced significant rural depopulation, a trend common to many villages in inland Spain, with the population declining from several hundred inhabitants to fewer than fifty today.

== Architecture and heritage ==
The urban centre preserves well-maintained examples of traditional mountain architecture, characterised by stone construction and tiled roofs integrated into the landscape.

=== Church of San Pedro Apóstol ===
The Church of San Pedro Apóstol (Church of Saint Peter the Apostle) is the principal historic monument of Valdelcubo and one of the examples of rural Romanesque architecture in the Sierra Norte. It dates to the 16th century and preserves medieval elements. Note: historically, the parish church was dedicated to Santiago el Mayor (Saint James the Greater), as recorded by Madoz in the 19th century.

=== Ermita de la Virgen de la Zarza ===
The Ermita de Nuestra Señora de la Zarza (Hermitage of Our Lady of the Bramble) is located approximately one kilometre from the village. It is a monument dating from the 16th–17th centuries and was formerly the centre of popular devotion and local pilgrimages (romerías). The hermitage originally comprised a central nave, a transept, and a bell gable (espadaña). In November 2011, part of its walls and roof collapsed, leaving it in a state of ruin. Since then it has been fenced off, and local residents have been pursuing a project to reconstruct it in the style of the original building.

=== Other heritage ===
The town also features a 20th-century stone drinking trough (pilón, dated 1933), the Mojón del Prado, and a cobaza or old ice-storage pit (nevera vieja).

== Demographics ==
The population of Valdelcubo has declined sharply over the past century, reflecting wider trends of rural depopulation in the interior of Spain. As of the latest INE census, the municipality has approximately 42 inhabitants, with an average age of around 62 years.

== Economy ==
The traditional economy of Valdelcubo was based on agriculture (cereals, legumes, potatoes, vegetables), livestock farming (sheep, horses, cattle), and small-scale milling (the 19th century saw seven flour mills in operation). Today, the local economy is primarily oriented towards rural tourism, nature-based activities and small-scale farming. The surrounding natural park offers opportunities for hiking, cycling and wildlife observation.

== Festivals and traditions ==
The main local festivals include:

- Last weekend of August: the main summer festival, featuring music events.
- Virgen de la Zarza (the Tuesday following 8 September): traditional patronal festival in honour of the patron saint, Our Lady of the Bramble.
- Día de Ánimas (2 November): traditional celebration involving pumpkin and hot chocolate.
- San Juan: traditional celebration with ramos (floral offerings).
- Carnaval: traditional celebrations including a rooster and a young heifer.

== Transport and access ==
Valdelcubo is accessible by local road from Sigüenza, the nearest larger town, which is located approximately 4 km away and has rail connections via the Madrid–Zaragoza railway line.

== See also ==
- Sierra Norte de Guadalajara Natural Park
- Ruta de Don Quijote
- Atienza
- Sigüenza
- Municipalities of the Province of Guadalajara
