= Church of San Pedro Apóstol =

Church of San Pedro Apóstol may refer to the following churches in Spain:

- Church of San Pedro Apóstol (Camarma de Esteruelas)
- Church of San Pedro Apóstol (Ribatejada)
- Church of San Pedro Apóstol (Villacadima)
- Church of San Pedro Apóstol (Vitoria)
