= Tympanum (architecture) =

Architectural element

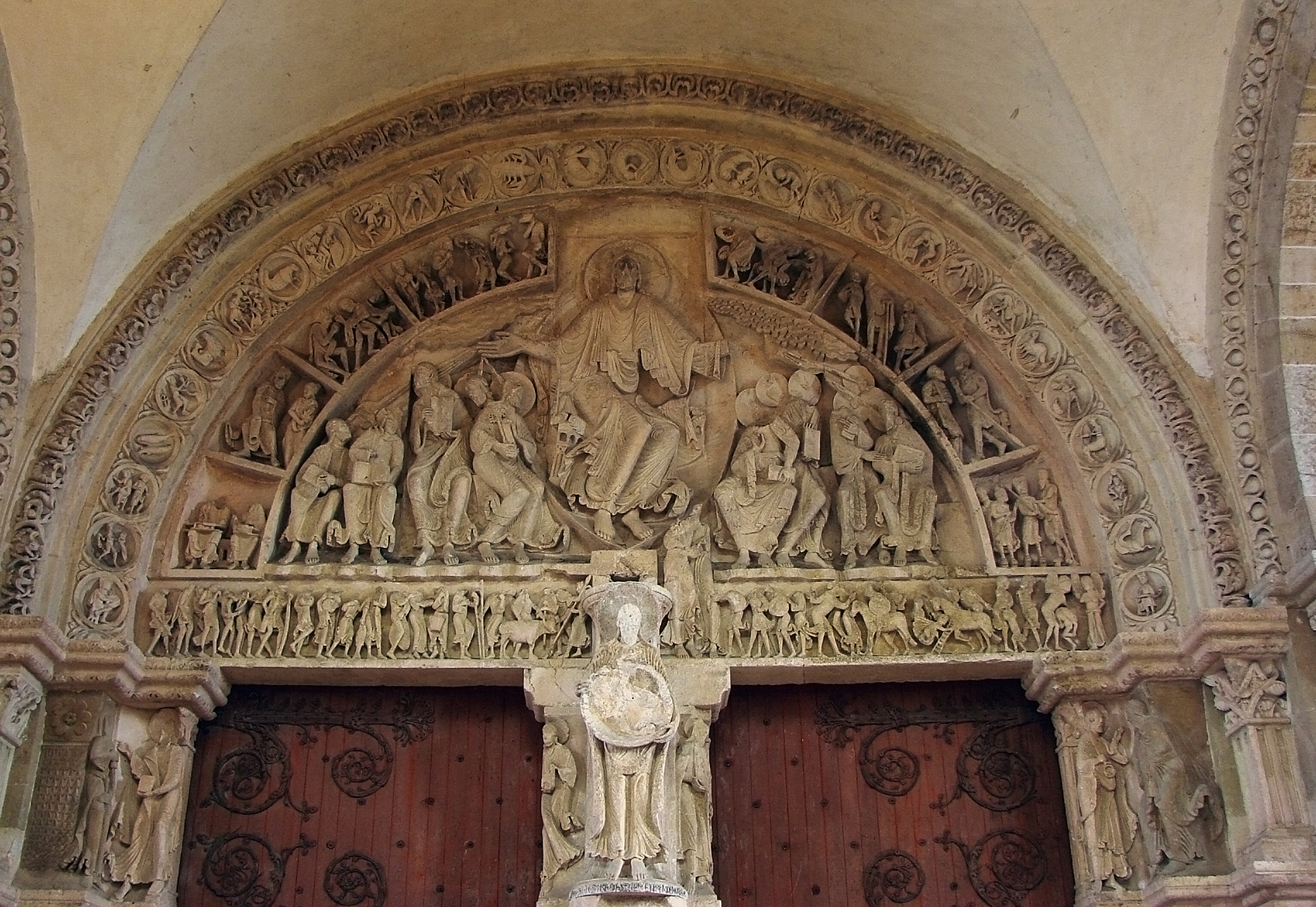
The late Romanesque tympanum of Vézelay Abbey, Burgundy, France, 1130s

A tympanum (pl. tympana or tympanums; from Greek and Latin words meaning "drum") is the semi-circular or triangular decorative wall surface over an entrance, door or window, which is bounded by a lintel and an arch. It often contains pedimental sculpture or other imagery or ornaments. Many architectural styles include this element, although it is most commonly associated with Romanesque and Gothic architecture.

Alternatively, the tympanum may hold an inscription, or in modern times, a clock face.

== Tympanums in antiquity and the Early Middle Ages ==
Tympanums are by definition inscriptions enclosed by a pediment; however, their evolution gives them more specific implications. Pediments first emerged early in Classical Greece around 700-480 BCE, with early examples such as the Parthenon remaining famous to this day. Pediments spread across the Hellenistic world with the rest of classical architecture. The engravings on the entablature at the time were sometimes blank but often contained statues of the gods and representations of geographic features. There are uncountable stories and messages in these inscriptions however the symbolism remained closely related to the philosophy and democracy associated with classical Greek city states. These themes continued when the Romans spread the style further into Europe, giving the pediment an aspect of authoritarian symbolism in provinces captured by conquest. Originally serving as the end of a gabled roof, in later imperial Rome the form of pediments was greatly adjusted. Pediments started being placed above any doorway and curved instead of triangle shapes were introduced, ignoring structural value and instead using the now abstracted form purely for decoration.

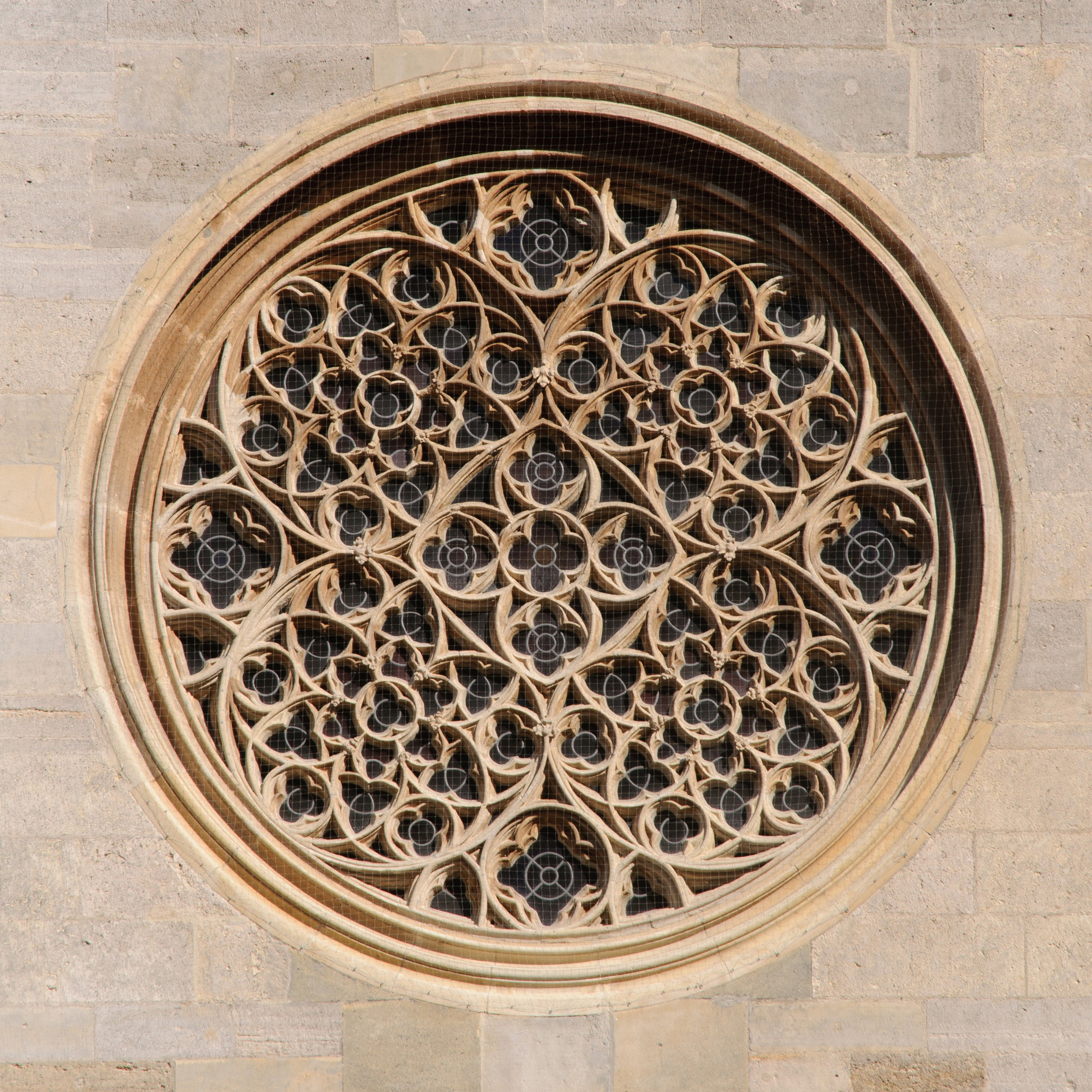
Rose window on St. Stephen's Cathedral - Vienna

After the collapse of the Roman empire, regions with significant classical architecture quickly adopted and transformed the features. In France, examples such as the Baptistry of St. Jean at Poitiers created in the 6th through 7th century CE defined Merovingian architecture. The form became even more abstracted in this period, replacing sculptures with geometric engravings and mosaics, and using small alternating curved and triangular pediments above windows on churches such as St. Generoux from the 9th or 10th century. This transformation continued throughout the later parts of the early Middle Ages, gradually shifting into the large circular stained glass windows of the gothic era known as rose windows.

While tympanums are inspired by the shape and placement of pediments, classical pediments more closely transformed into rose windows than tympanums. And when pedimented shapes reappeared over gothic and Romanesque portals, inspiration can be traced in other directions. According to the Gospel of Luke, above Jesus on the cross was written "this is the king of jews" to mock his powerlessness. This inspired buildings as early as the Arch of Constantine and Old Saint Peters Basilica, both of which featured an engraving a Christ with a poem inscribed in second person perspective, an essential feature of later tympanum inscriptions. Early reliquaries and pilgrimage churches employed this convention, such as the Shrine of Saint Martin at Tours which in 558 installed engravings of the life of Christ and the churches patron saint (Saint Martin). These engravings were situated directly above the main entrances and had poems inscribed directing visitors on how they should feel entering the church. This was quickly replicated in Carolingian era churches such as the Abbey of Saint Gall in Switzerland, completing the form of the tympanum.

== Romanesque tympanums ==
The Romanesque era (1000–1200) saw massive change in church architecture. Pilgrimage required churches to rethink layouts and symbolism and the ever-rising Benedictine Order changed rules on how churches should operate and appear. Architecturally, the Romanesque era saw an increased appreciation for classical forms, coupled with an increase in church construction related to several factors including political turmoil and thanking God for not ending the world in the year 1000. Tympanums are one of the most prominent features of Romanesque architecture, originating in this time and replicated in Christian architecture ever since.

=== France ===
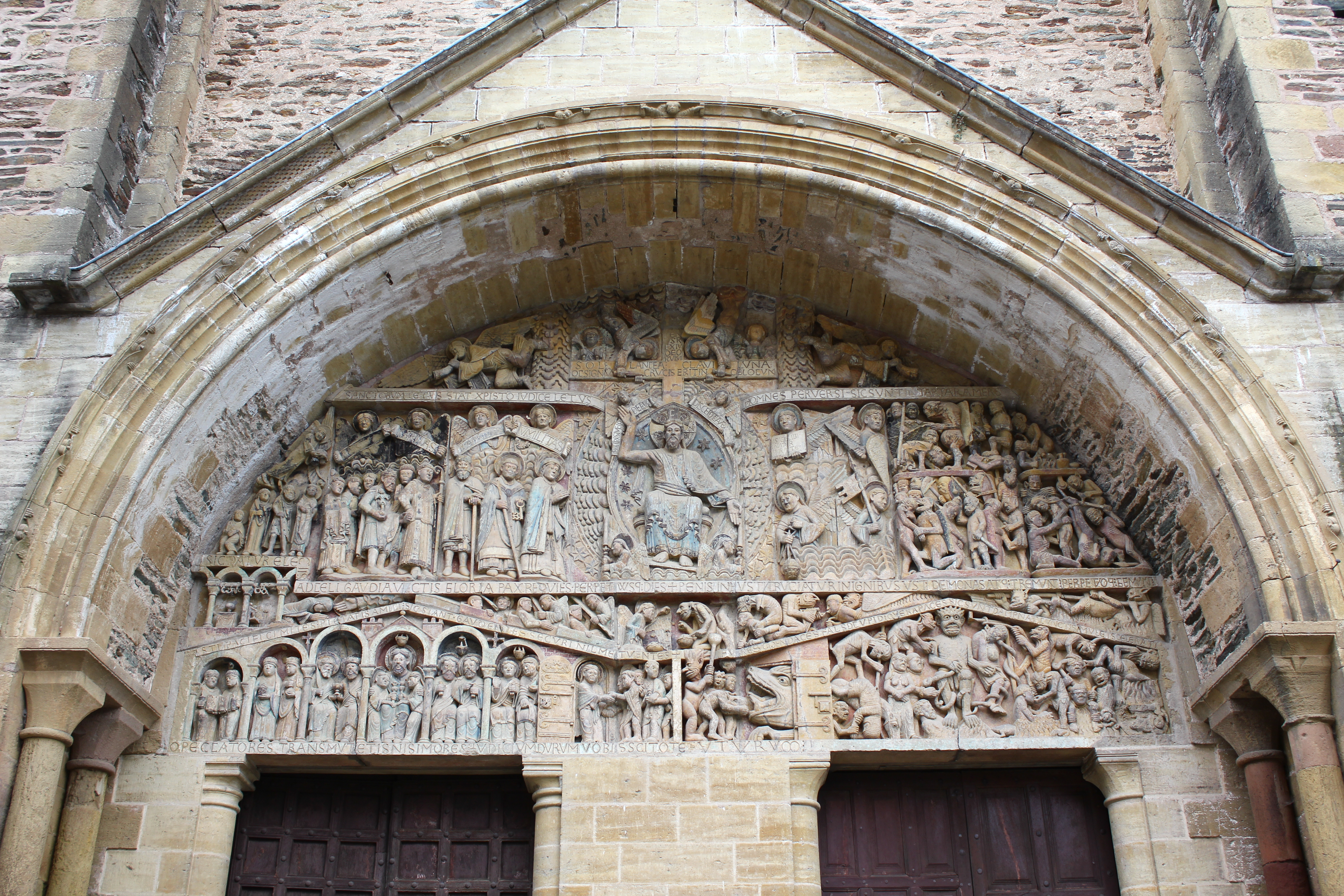
Tympanum of the Abbey of Sainte-Foy in Conques

The Tympanum above the west portal of the Sainte-Foy church in Conques is one the most iconic tympanum; carved in the early 1100s, it is emblematic of the style, purpose and culture of Romanesque tympanums. This tympanum depicts The Last Judgement, which was the subject of a large portion of tympanums, however, the Conques tympanum is far more detailed in its figures and scenes in a way reminiscent of Roman reliefs. This work was meant to be horrifying to the people who passed under it, on the right demons torture the souls of the damned, sinners are fed to grotesque monsters, and people are crammed into small spaces as they await their judgment. Contrasting, this is Christ in the middle and the saved souls on the left, serving as a reminder for pilgrims of why they made their journey. The imagery on this tympanum is primarily meant to remind the viewer of the power of God’s judgement, part of many ways that tympanums from the era mentally prepared pilgrims for the experience of the church. There are many more subtle messages however, such as encouraging donations through depicting a miser character being damned, and even making comments about politics by showing Charlemagne bowing his head.

The Coucy Doujon tympanum was carved between 1225 and 1230 and is evidence that tympanums were used in secular settings as well. The large tympanum was positioned above the door to the largest tower, as a way to tell anyone entering the building a message. The message for this particular tympanum is relatively unknown, featuring a figure likely from Coucy family history fighting a lion. Lions had many symbolic meanings in the Romanesque era and this one is likely a reference to a king or an event from the crusades. Despite the secular theme, it has a very similar style, form, and purpose to the many tympanums on nearby churches. It retains the shape and inscription and shows a large central character with classically inspired detail, movement and emotion.

=== Spain ===
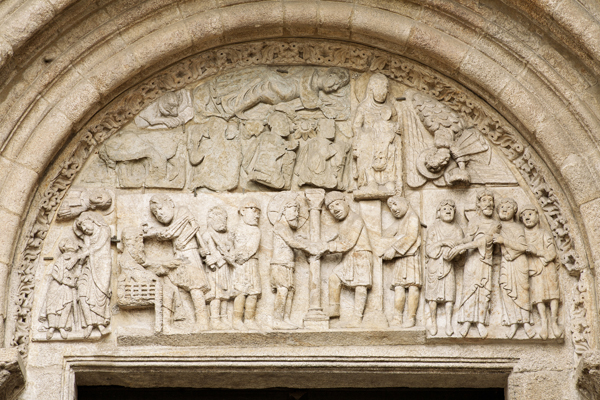
Tympanum on the Santiago de Compostela cathedral - Spain

Tympanums are also prominent in Spanish architecture, appearing on the pilgrimage churches that spread southwest through the Reconquista. Santiago de Compostela was one of the most prominent pilgrimage churches and features deeply carved tympanums, the Portico of Glory and the double typanum on the south facade. Many other examples appeared throughout the Iberian peninsula starting with the church in Jaca which the 1090s was carved with one of the first archetypical Romanesque tympanums in Europe. Spanish architecture from the Reconquista era is defined by the combination of Christian and Arabian styles, and tympanums were no exception to this. Many of the sculptors for Spanish Romanesque churches were Moorish, and adapted Arabian forms and styles into tympanums, resulting in brighter reds and nature-like geometric patterns. these sculptors continued their work throughout the continent, spreading Arabian influences as far as Le Puy and Conques.

=== Eastern European ===
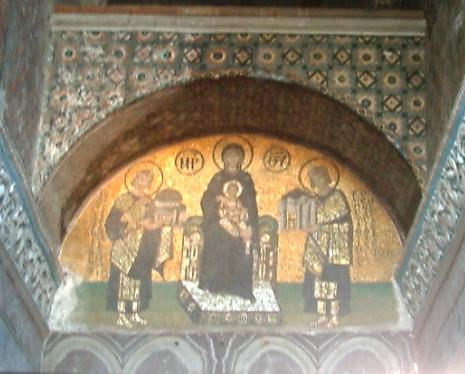
Mosaic from the Hagia Sofia - Turkey.Shows a Byzantine mosaic in the form that would later be adapted to tympanums.

Tympanums were an essential part of Christian architecture in this time, and thus were common in the highly religious Byzantine empire. The Hagia Sofia has several tympanums, carved either when the church was finished in the 500s or during renovations the 800s and 1200s. While this seems to challenge the development of tympanums explained in the first section of this article, these late antiquity Tympanums were an evolutionary prequel to Romanesque tympanums. The major differences are that Early Byzantine tympanums are all mosaic in the Byzantine style, are all inside of their churches, and very few are above doors. Despite this, there are still notable similarities, namely the half moon shape and a large central image of Christ or an important Saint. Coupled with their inscriptions, these early tympanums would've had the same purpose and message as later tympanums. Which used this convention and changed the medium to integrated them more with other features and emphasize their message.

While many of the distinct changes in Tympanum style happened in France and Spain in the 1000s, we find the Romanesque style all across the Christian world. The church at Javari Georgia built in the 600s was significant throughout the Middle Ages, sitting at a hotspot for war and pilgrimage. The tympanums, at the time their carving, served to align Javari with western conventions while using the imagery to support their political struggle. This was quickly copied throughout the Caucuses and further, for example Mren church in Armenia has a typical tympanum layout and common Christian figures, however these figures are carved in a Persian style with Persian clothes, showing regional stylistic differences.

== Gothic Tympanums ==
Despite being most heavily associated with the Romanesque era, Tympanums are still used to this day. Gothic architecture heavily featured tympanums, taking influence from Romanesque examples and adapting them to better match the Gothic style. Gothic architecture and decoration is known for its ostentatious detail, and tympanums were no exception, becoming more decorative through deep carvings and intricate archivolts. Another important change in Gothic tympanums is the loss of the inscription, making more room for decoration and reflecting changing ideas about how people were meant to view churches.

=== France ===
While France is often credited for inventing the Gothic style, by the 1200s tympanums had already spread throughout Europe. There was still significant innovation made in French early-Gothic tympanums, much of which can be credited to the sculptor Gislebertus. Gislebertus worked on several churches between France and Italy, and applied many similar features across them. The Autun Cathedral is an excellent example, emphasizing thinness and decoration in everything from the towers to the walls to the tympanum. Also common in Gilbertese's work, The Autun tympanum has a very narrow inscription below it, and while this inscription is still very emphasized, it foreshadows the complete removal of the inscription.

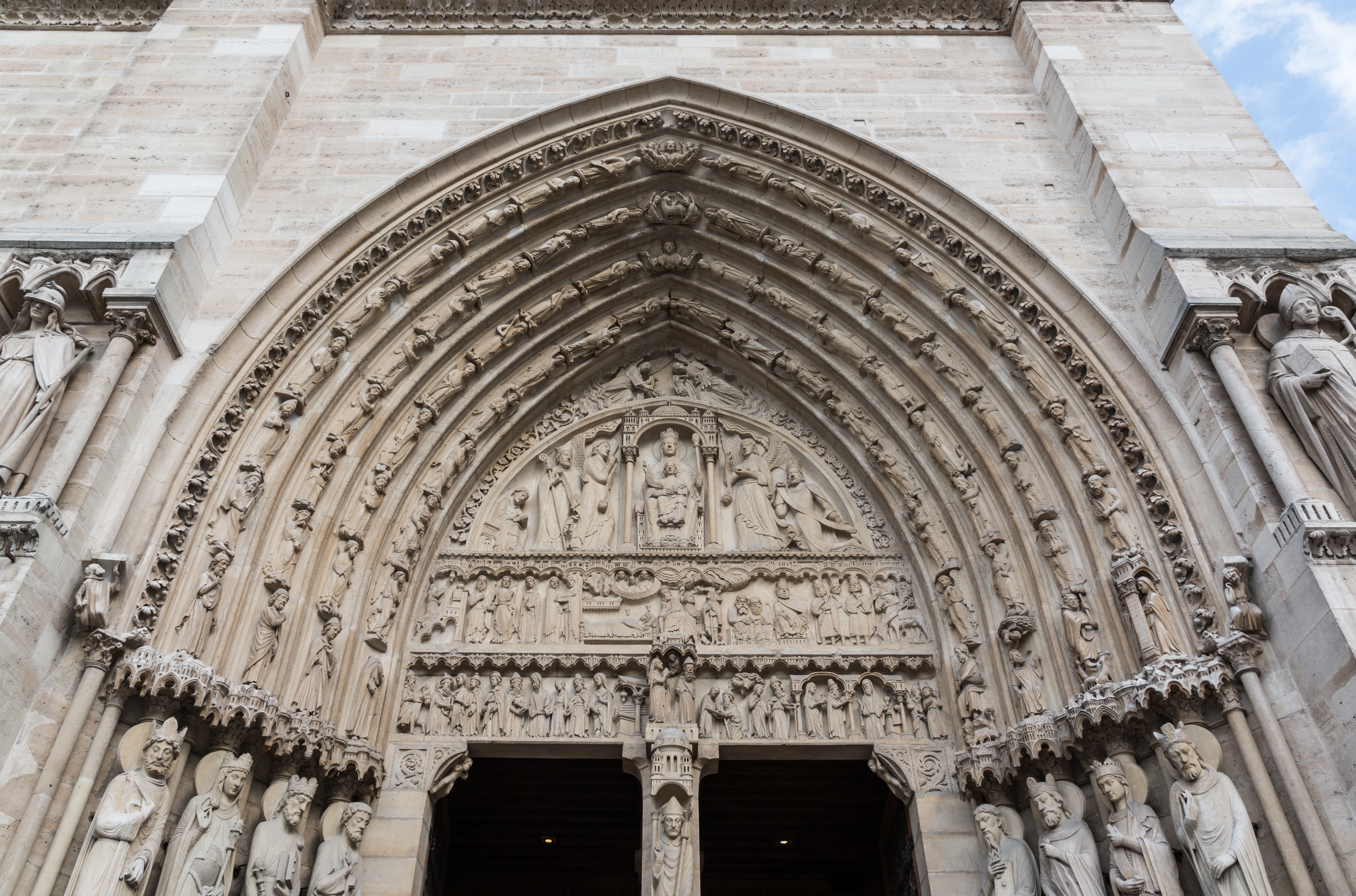
Tympanum on Notre Dame Cathedral

The Notre Dame Cathedral is one of the most iconic examples of French Romanesque-Gothic architecture, and has several tympanums. The original 1163 reliefs are typical Romanesque tympanums in form and style, featuring common characters such as Christ, Mary, and a select couple saints. In the late 1300s there were significant renovations, which sought to make the cathedral match contemporary gothic styles by widening, restoring and replacing many of the tympanums. The image on the right shows many of the features common to Gothic tympanums, retaining the shape and large central figure surrounded by smaller characters. There is much more space given to intricate detail however, manifesting in the archivolts, caryatids, and relief.

=== Spain ===
While the Reconquista was unconducive to large building projects, as Iberia became more peaceful in the early gothic era the lingering Arabian influences lead to many unique architectural developments. The Cathedral of Barcelona from the early 1400s is similar to Moorish buildings in almost everything about the plan, both on the interior and exterior; namely, the cathedral is filled with evenly distributed columns over an open space, which was one of the most common elements of Moorish architecture. Much of it is still Christian however, and the tympanum was an effective way to show messages on a medium associated with Christian culture. Saint Hermandad in Toledo is another 1400s gothic cathedral and also shows the influence of Moorish culture. The tympanums are carved with both religious and secular images, showing the head of Christ on one side and an eagle on the other. This shows how even without the inscription, Gothic tympanums still served to set a mindset for people who enter, reminding the (religiously diverse in the case of Spain) population of the importance of Christianity and the royals that justified their power through god.

=== Italy ===
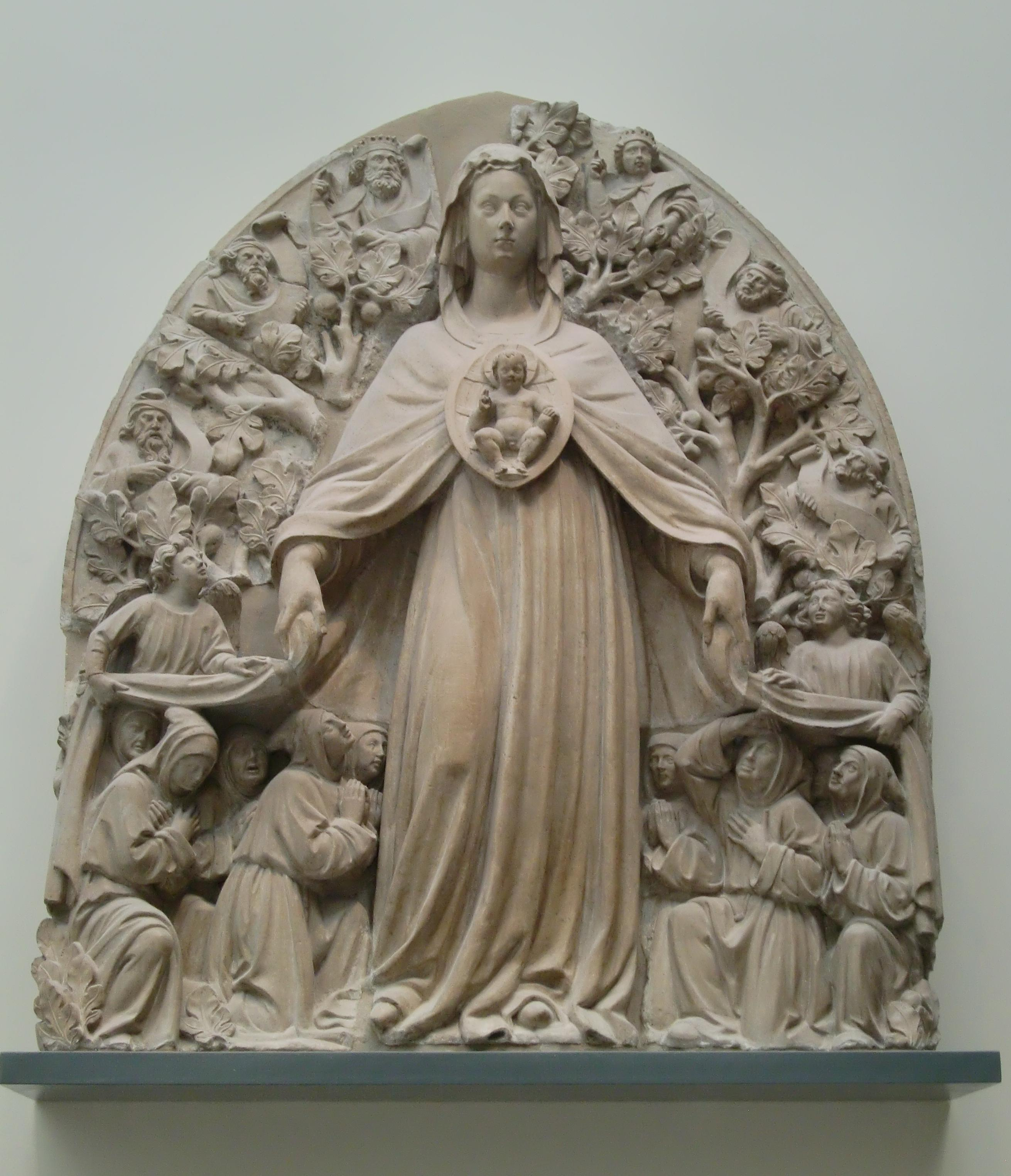
Relief originally from the tympanum on the Scuola Vecchia - Italy

While there are many consistent features of gothic architecture, regional differences were strong throughout Europe. Similarly to Spain, Italian tympanums show influence from local culture, keeping features that were already common in Italian architecture and adding new developments. The Scuola Vecchia was a cult meeting house made in Venice around 1445–50. What makes it particularly famous is the tympanum over the main door which has been “a prominent feature in the Venetian land-scape for over five hundred years”, despite being moved 5 times. This church is very similar to many other Italian churches, such as Madonna dell'Orto nearby and at the church of S. Maria Gloriosa dei Frari, both of which have feature especially pointed tympanums with columns on either side and another column or caryatid above. The feature most associated with Italian Gothic tympanums however is that the inscription is retained, which we can see on all of the tympanums mentioned in this paragraph. The tradition of putting inscriptions on curved pediments originated in Italy in late antiquity constructions, such as Old Saint Peters basilica. While these were an inspiration to the archetypical tympanum, Italians kept many of their architectural traditions consistent, retaining features such as the pointed shape and the inscription. This by no means however means that there is no outside influence. Italian tympanums feature the same style and purpose as other examples, using large, deeply carved, central figures of Christ and an important contemporary person to remind people of the importance of these figures as they enter the church.

== Gallery ==
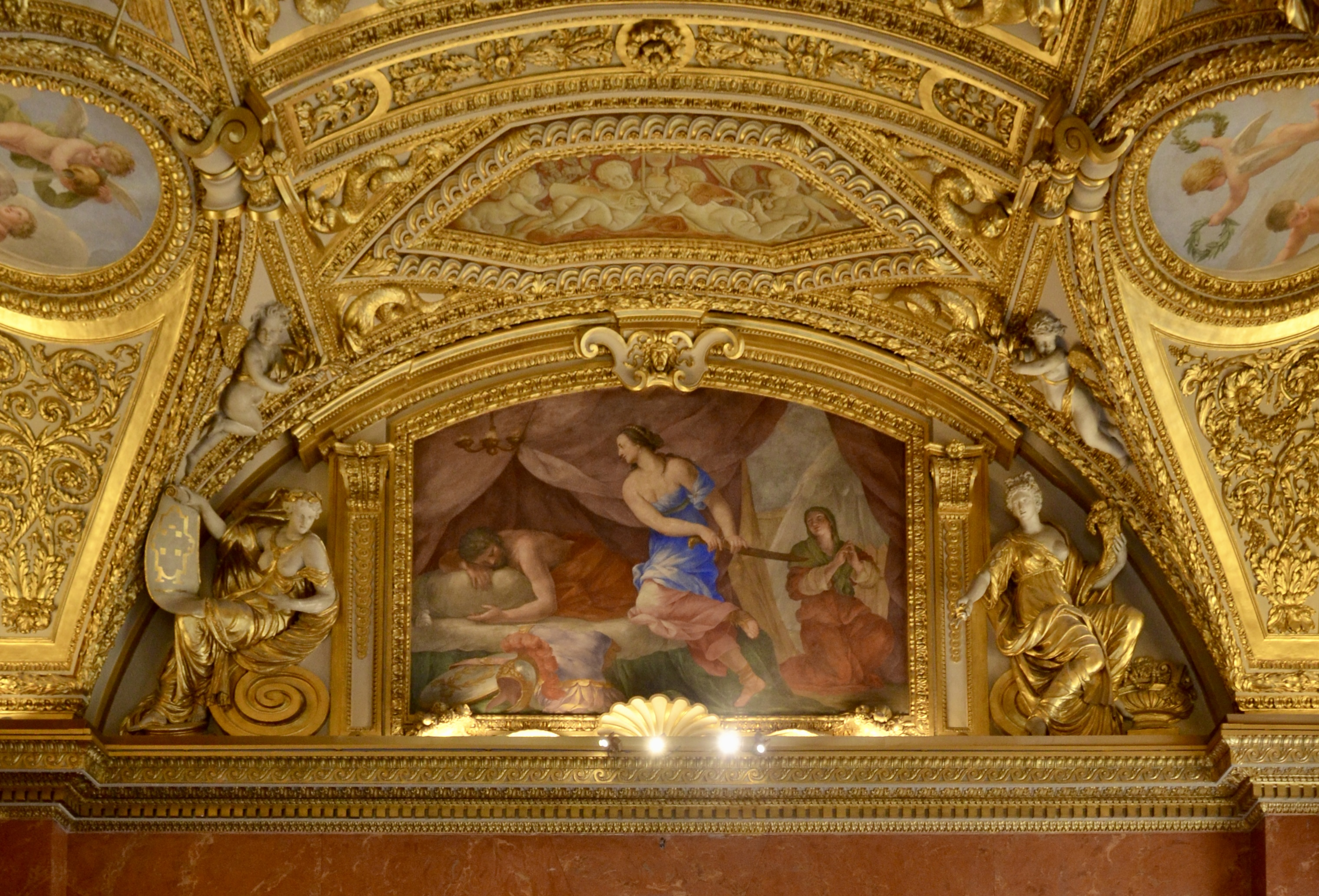
Baroque tympanum in the Queen's Bedroom in the Louvre Palace, Paris, by Michel Anguier and Pietro Sasso, with a painting of Judith and Holophernes, by Giovanni Francesco Romanelli, 1655

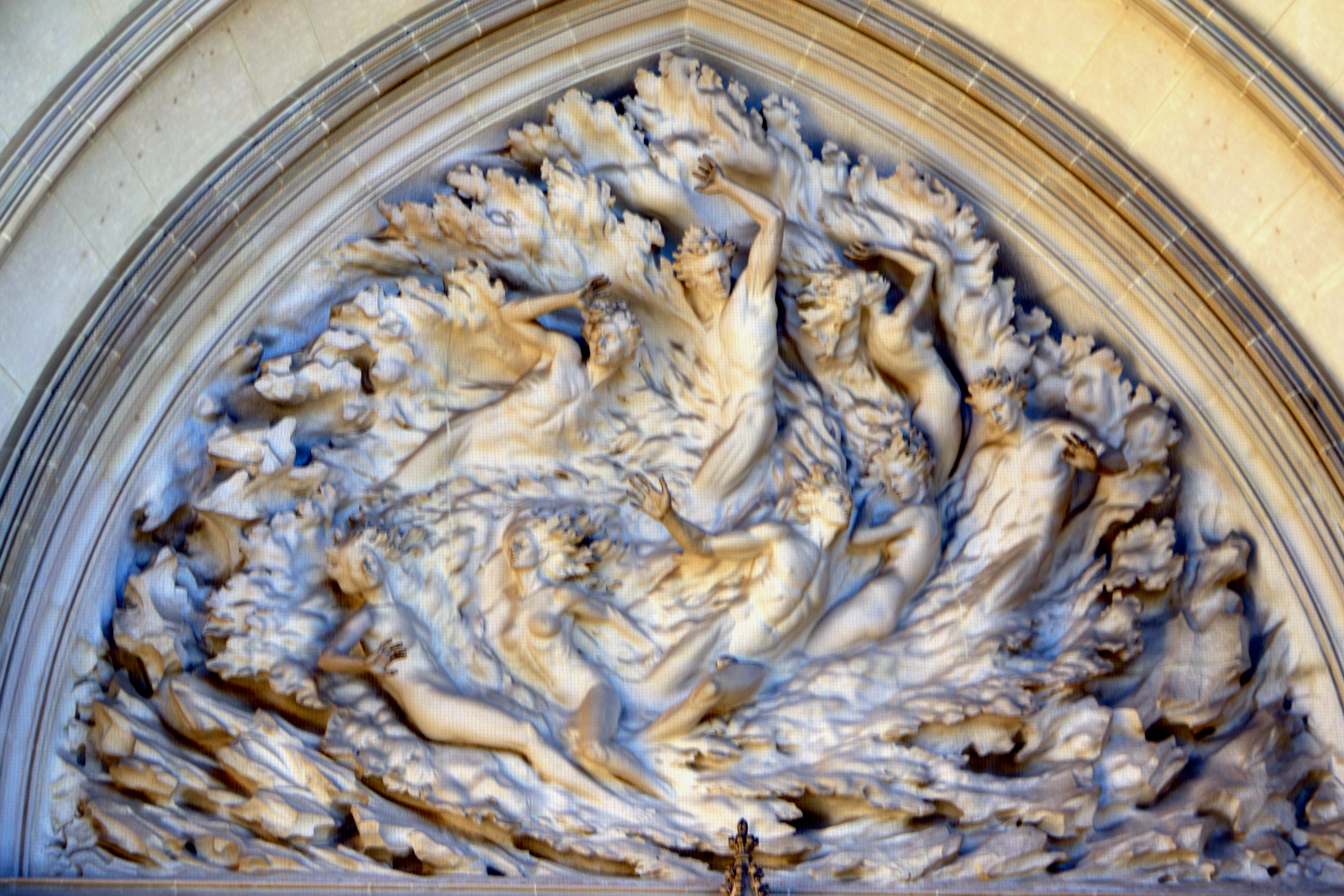
Ex Nihilo (Out of Nothing) by Frederick Hart, tympanum over center doors, Washington National Cathedral, US

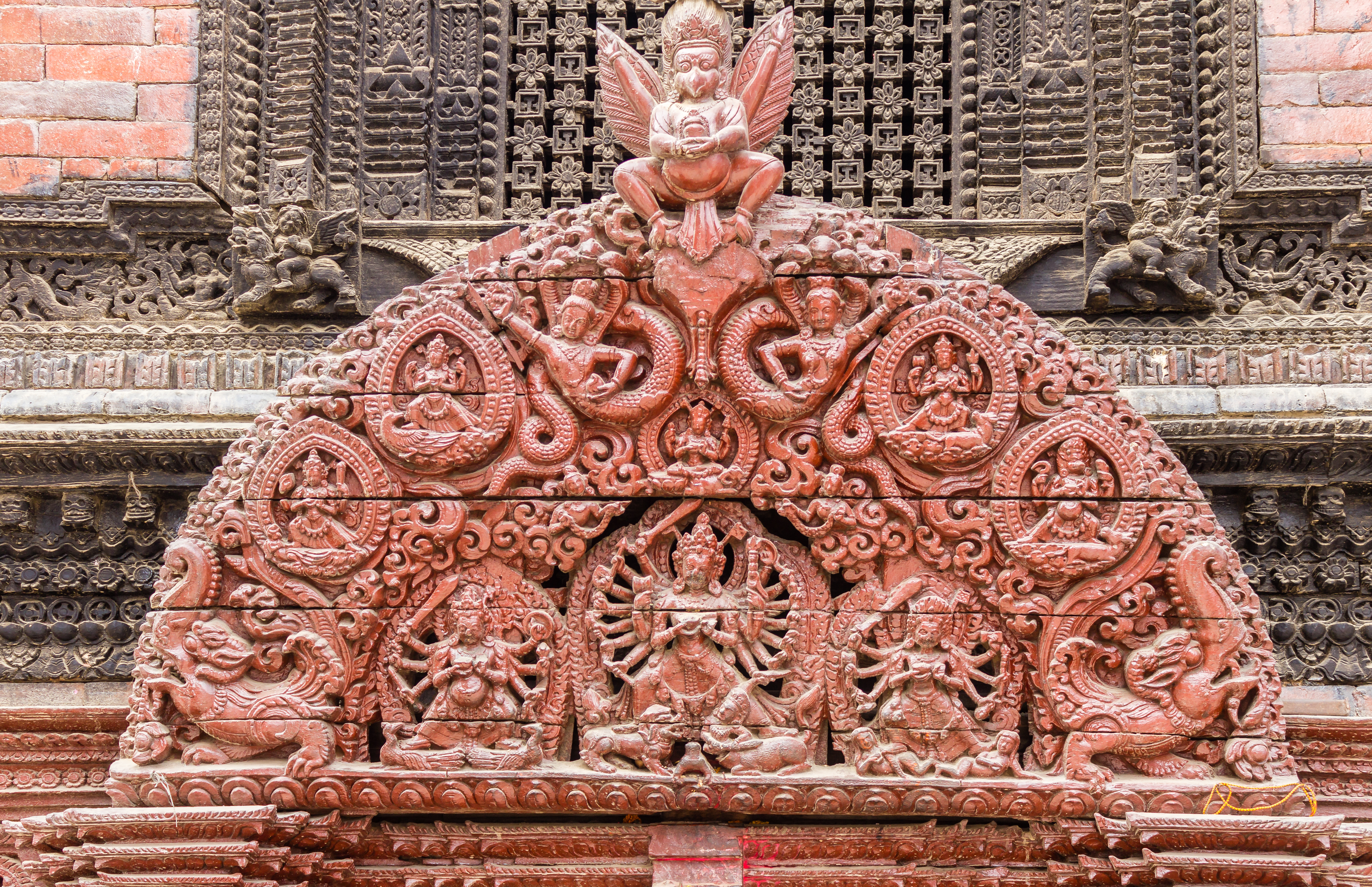
Tympanum of Kumari-ghar at Basantapur Durbar Square, Kathmandu

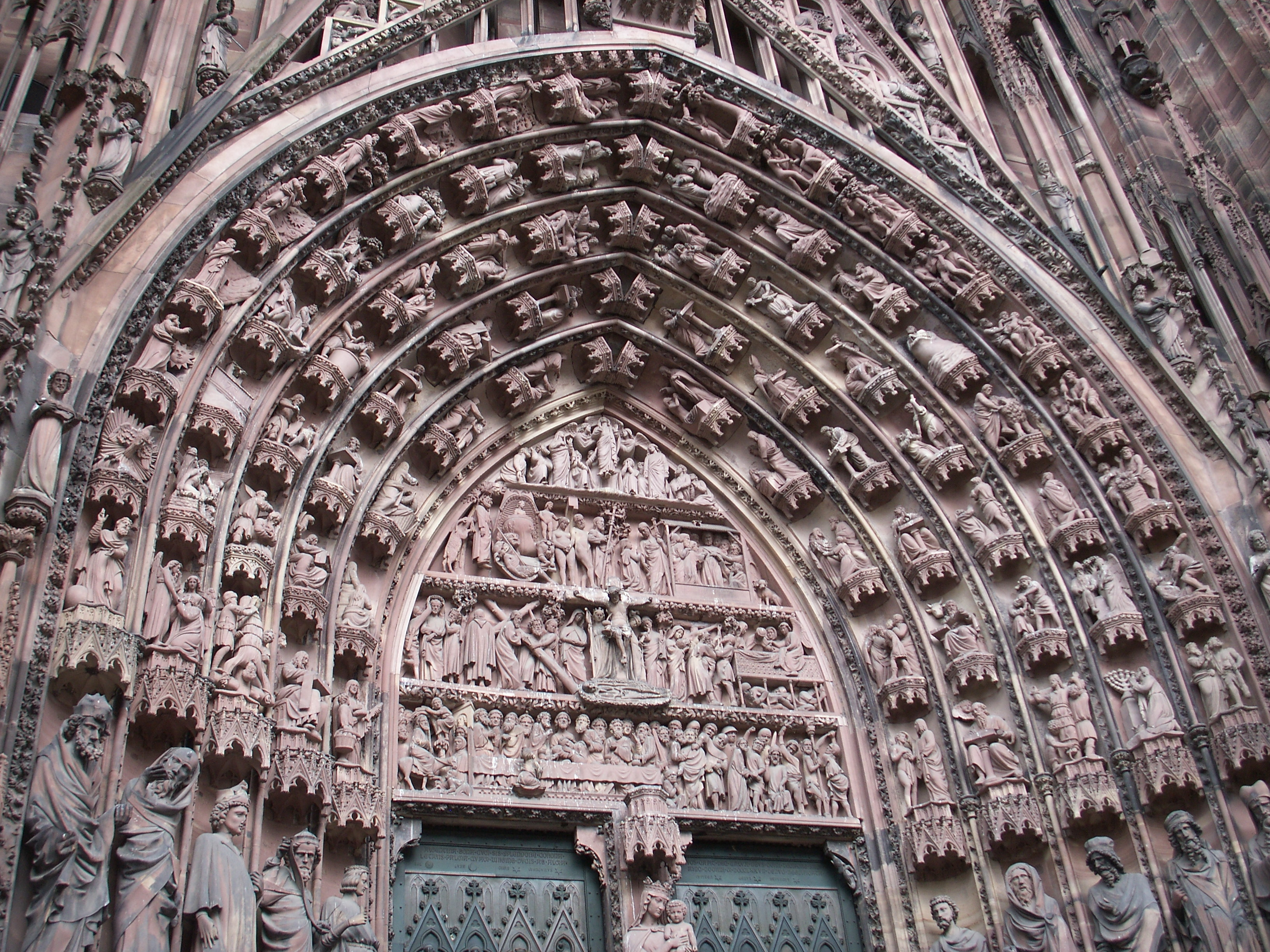
Archivolts surrounding a tympanum of the west façade, Strasbourg Cathedral, France

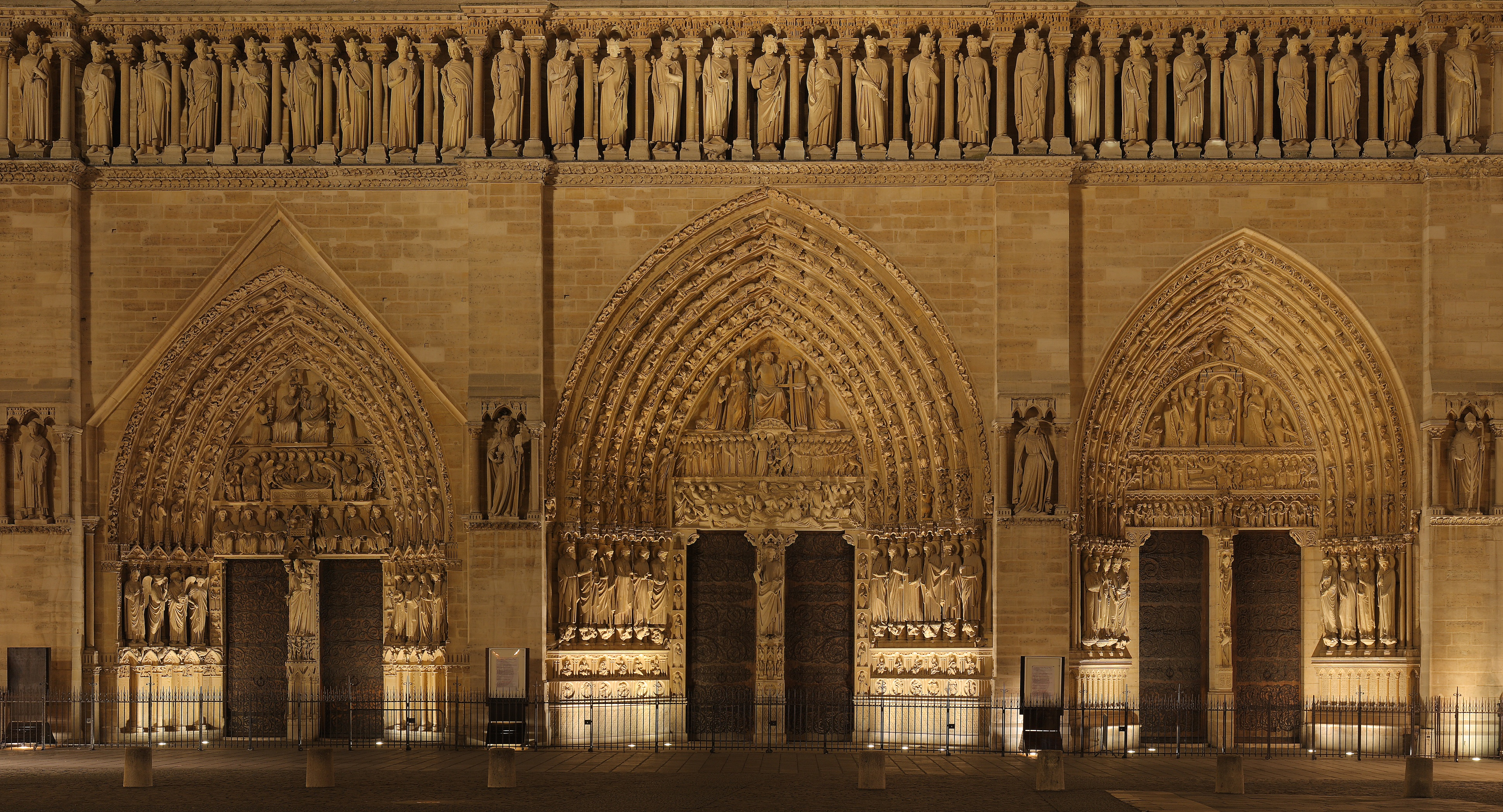
The three tympana on the main façade of Notre-Dame de Paris, France

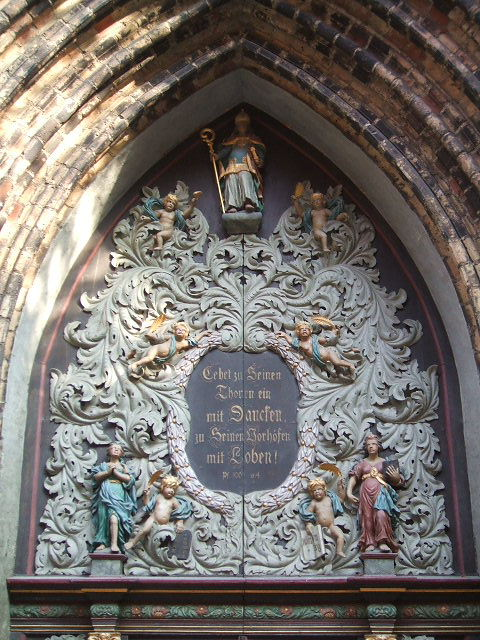
Sculpted tympanum in Stralsund, Germany

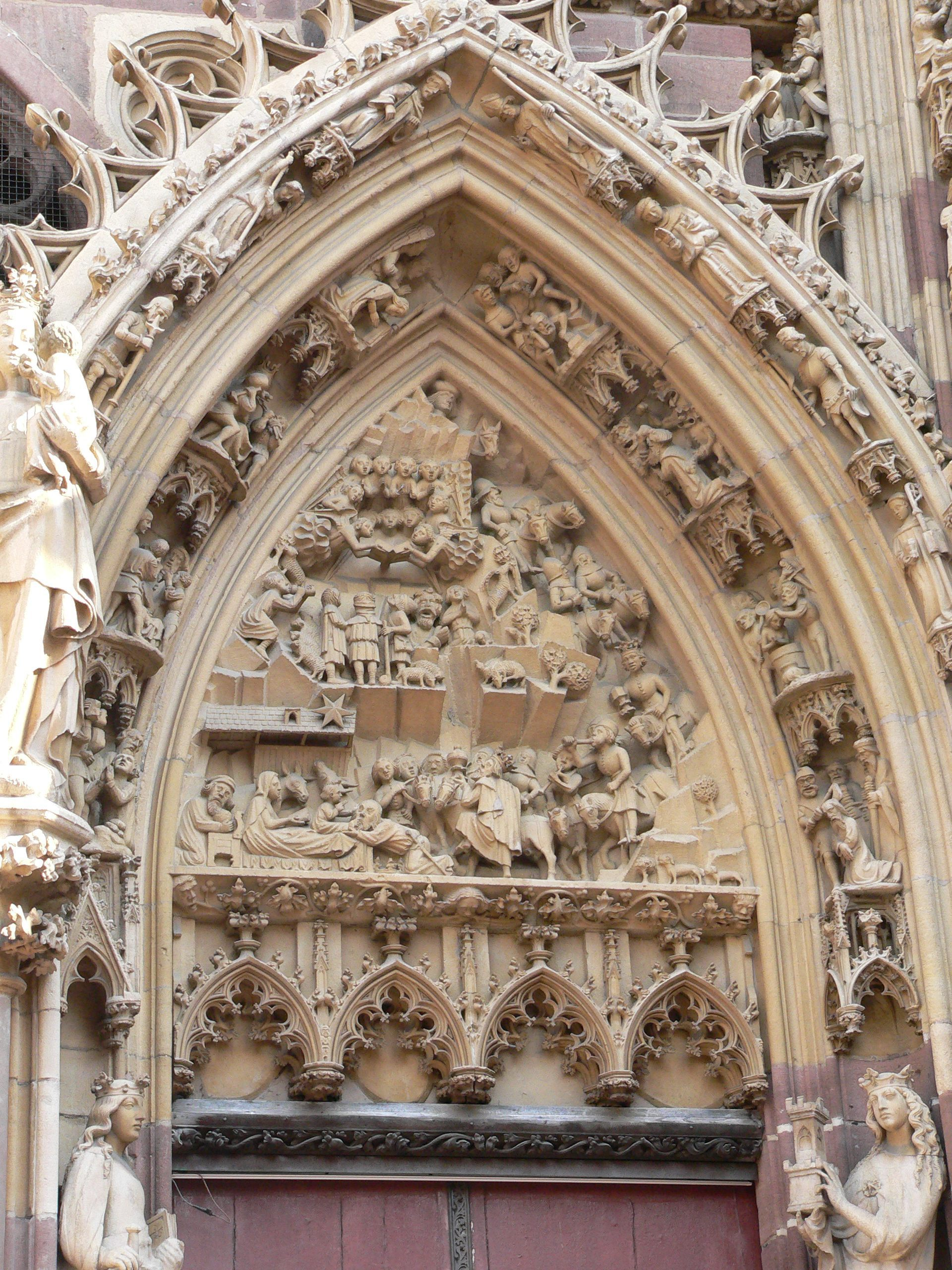
Adoration of the Magi on a tympanum on Saint-Thiébaut Church, Thann, France

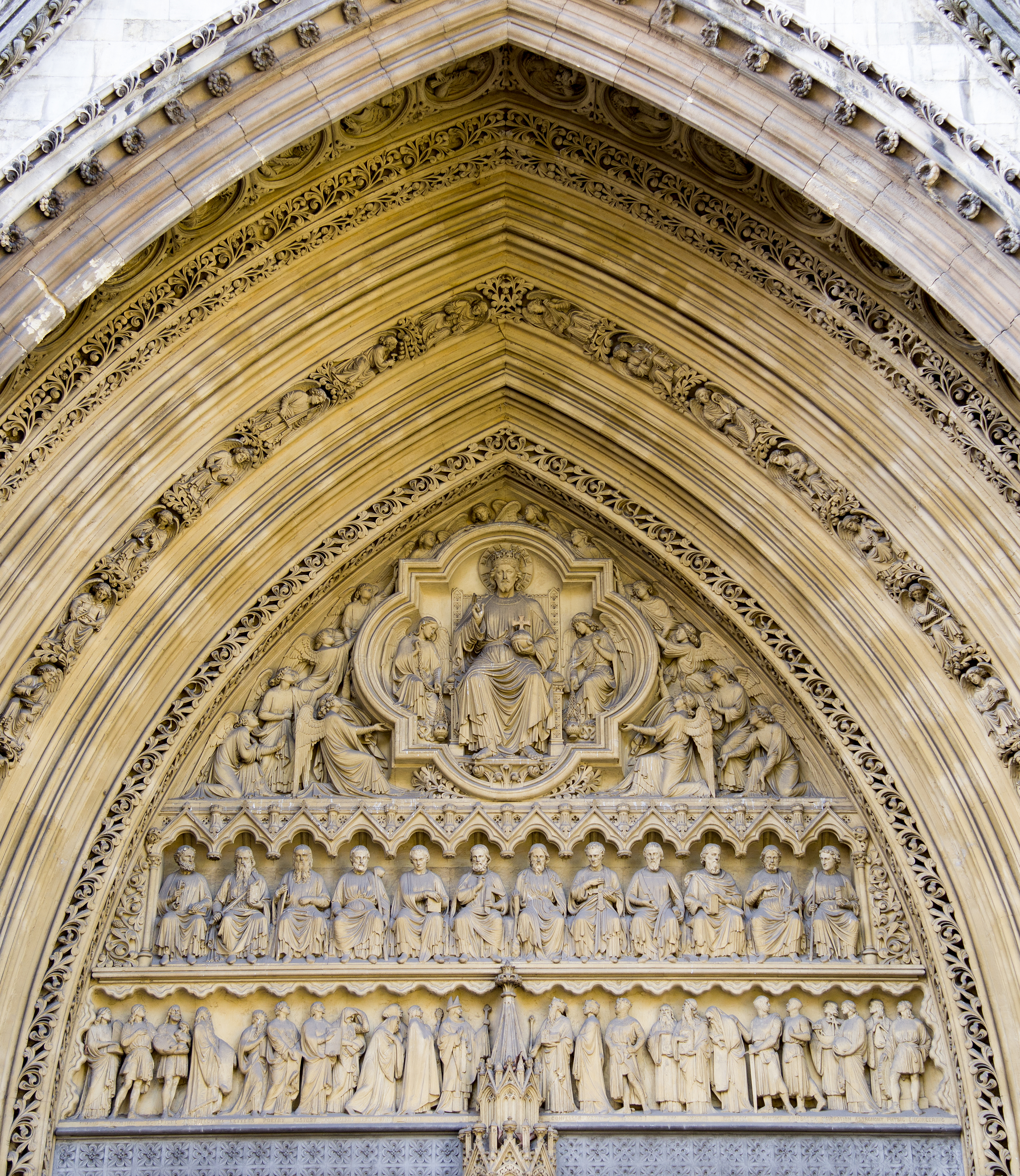
Tympanum above the North Entrance of Westminster Abbey, London, England

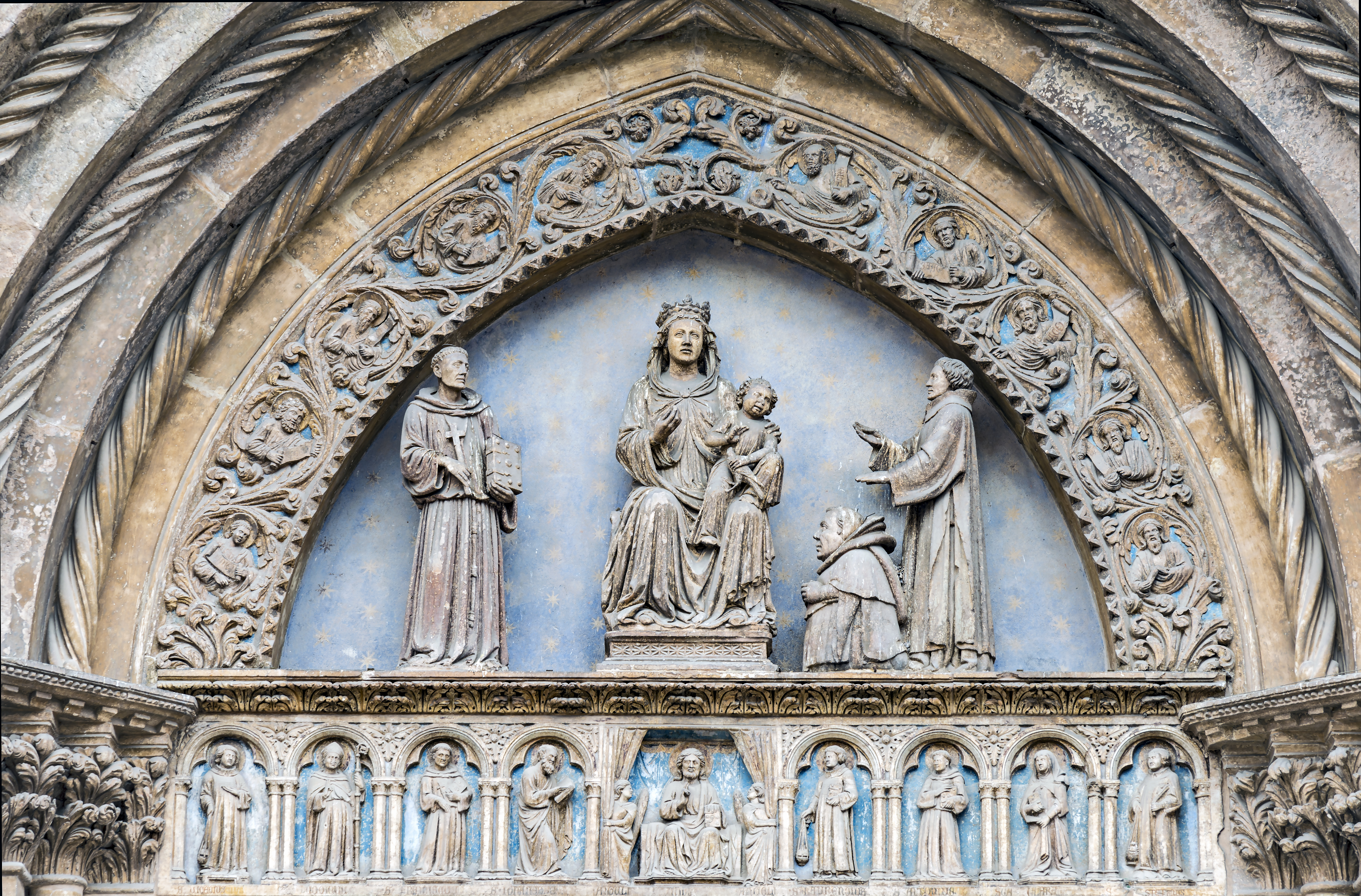
Religious scene in a tympanum, Church San Lorenzo, Vicenza, Italy

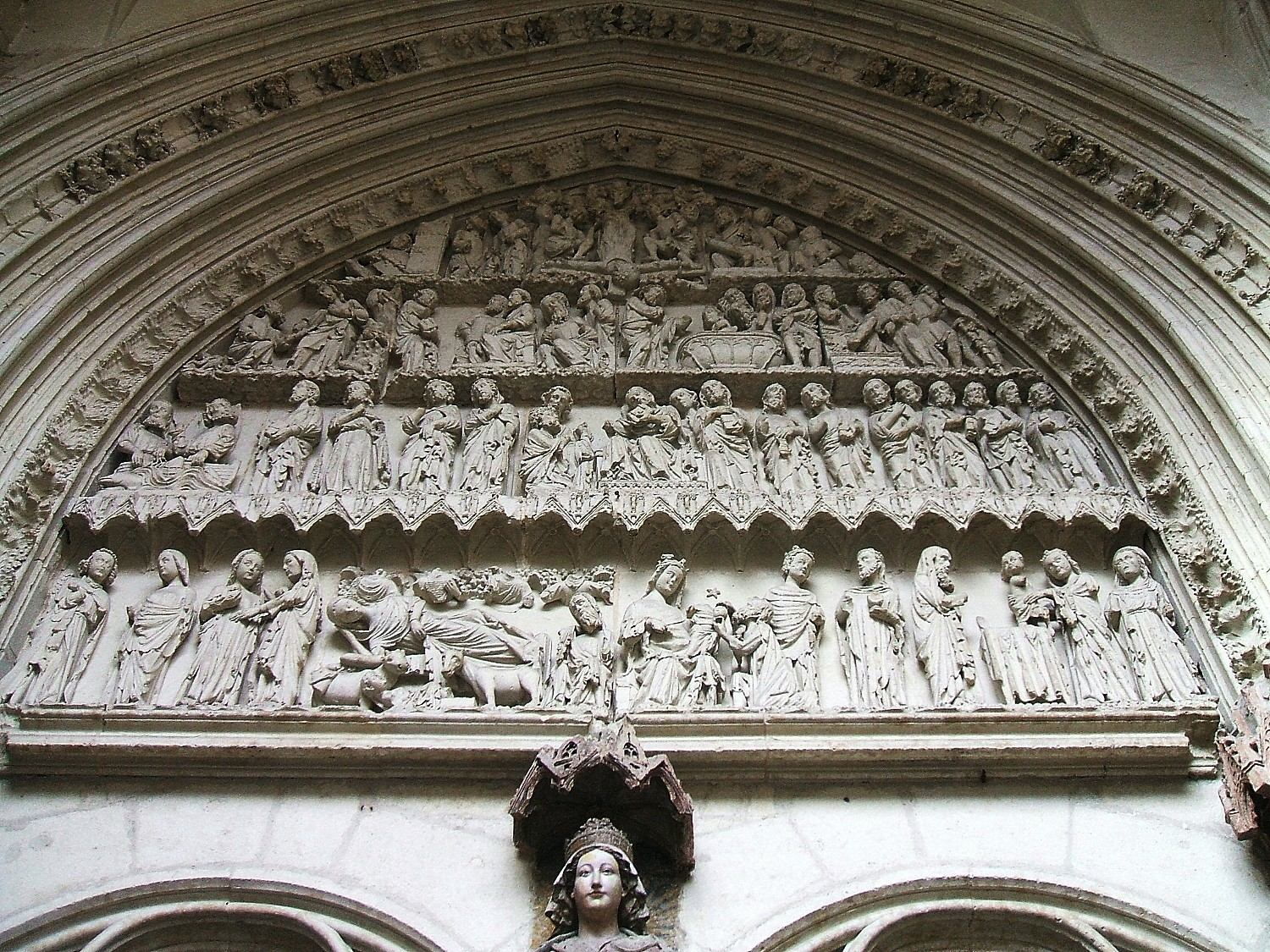
Scenes of the lives of Saint Peter and Mary, St Peter's, Vitoria-Gasteiz, Spain

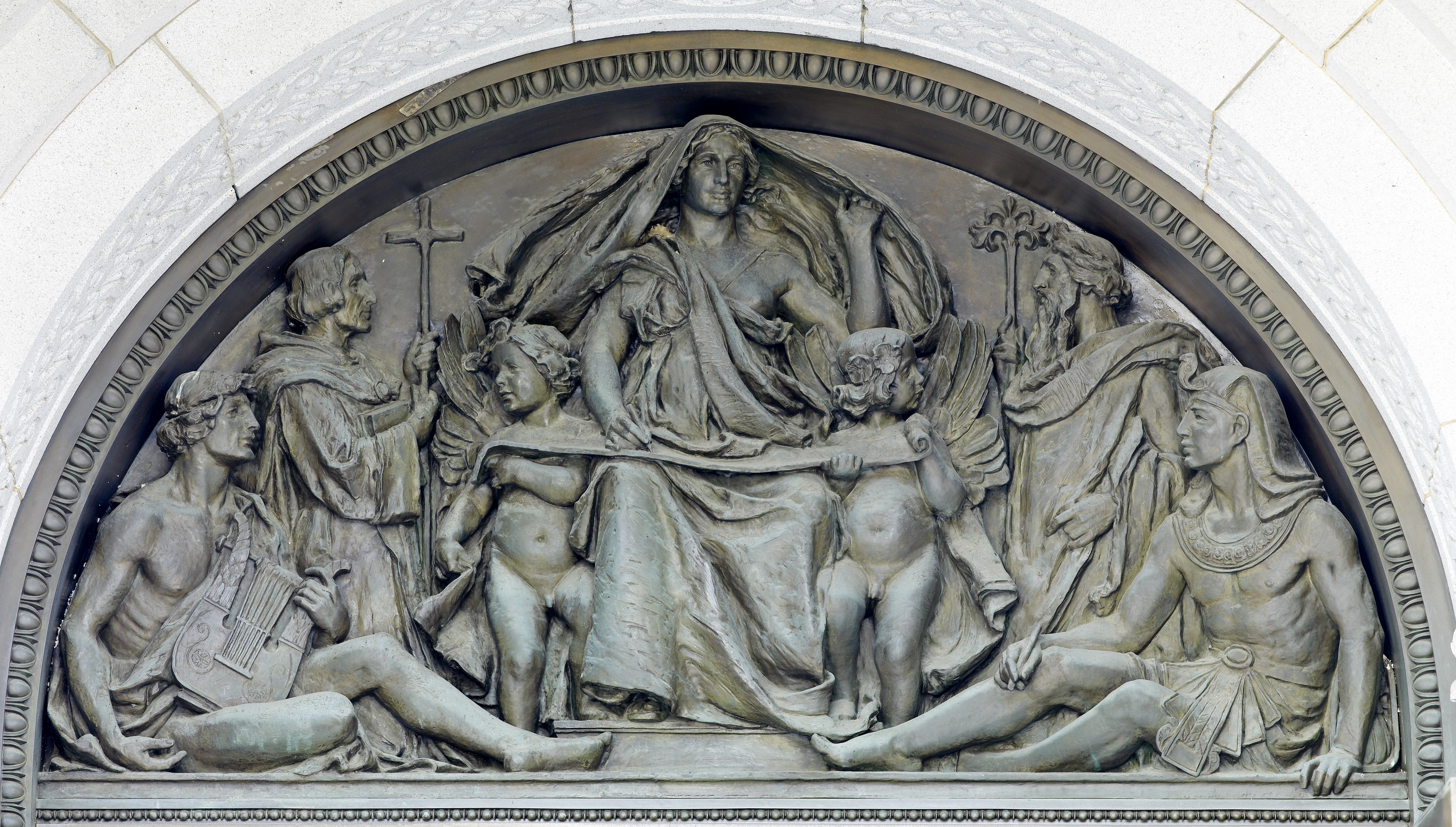
High-relief bronze tympanum of Writing, Thomas Jefferson Building, Washington, D.C., US

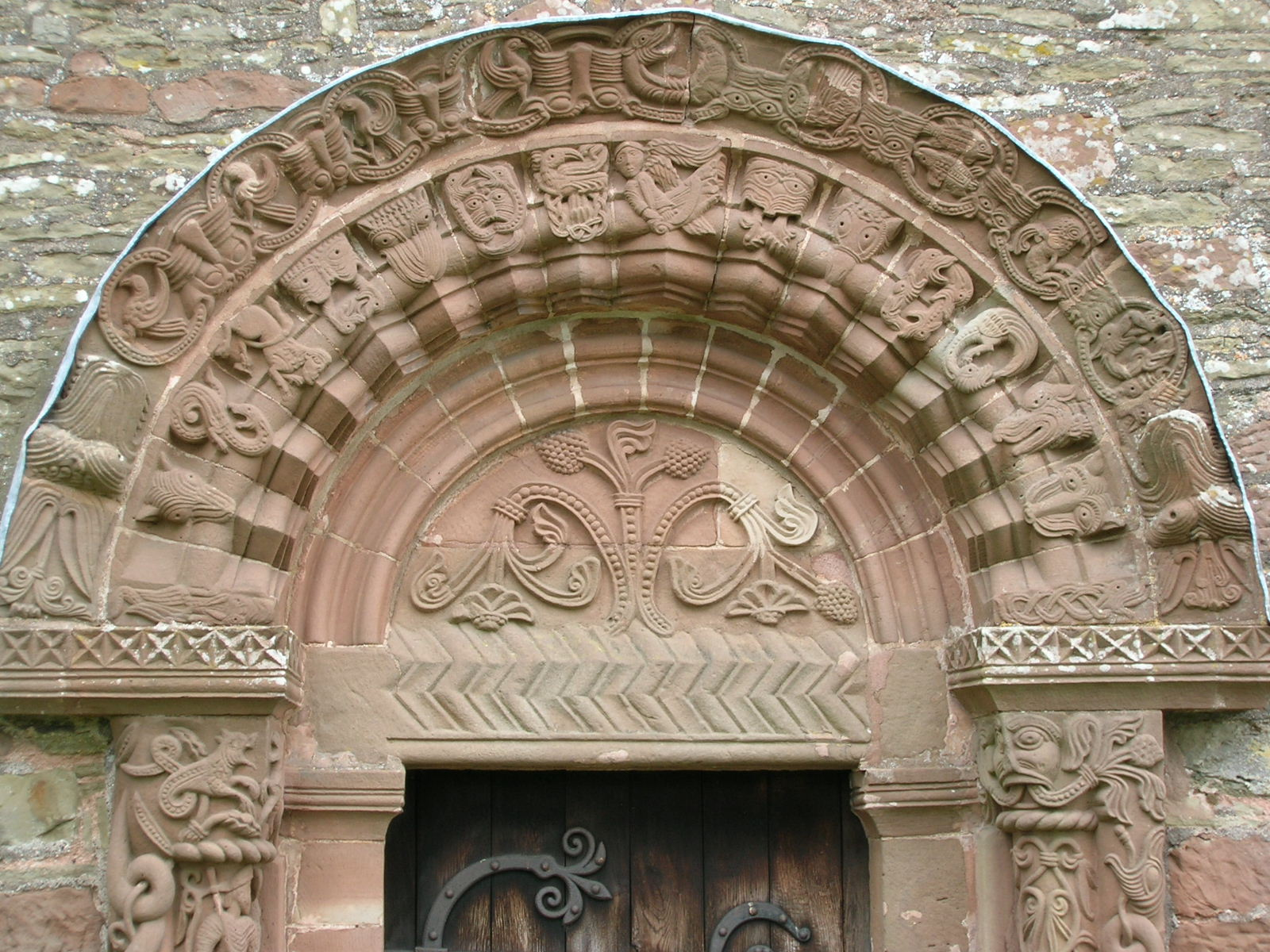
Tympanum (showing the tree of life) and archivolt at Church of St Mary and St David, Kilpeck, Herefordshire, England

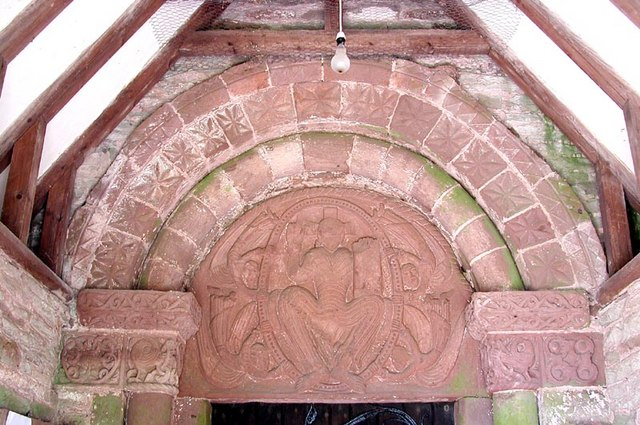
Tympanum showing Christ in Majesty with four attendant angels, Rowlestone, Herefordshire, England

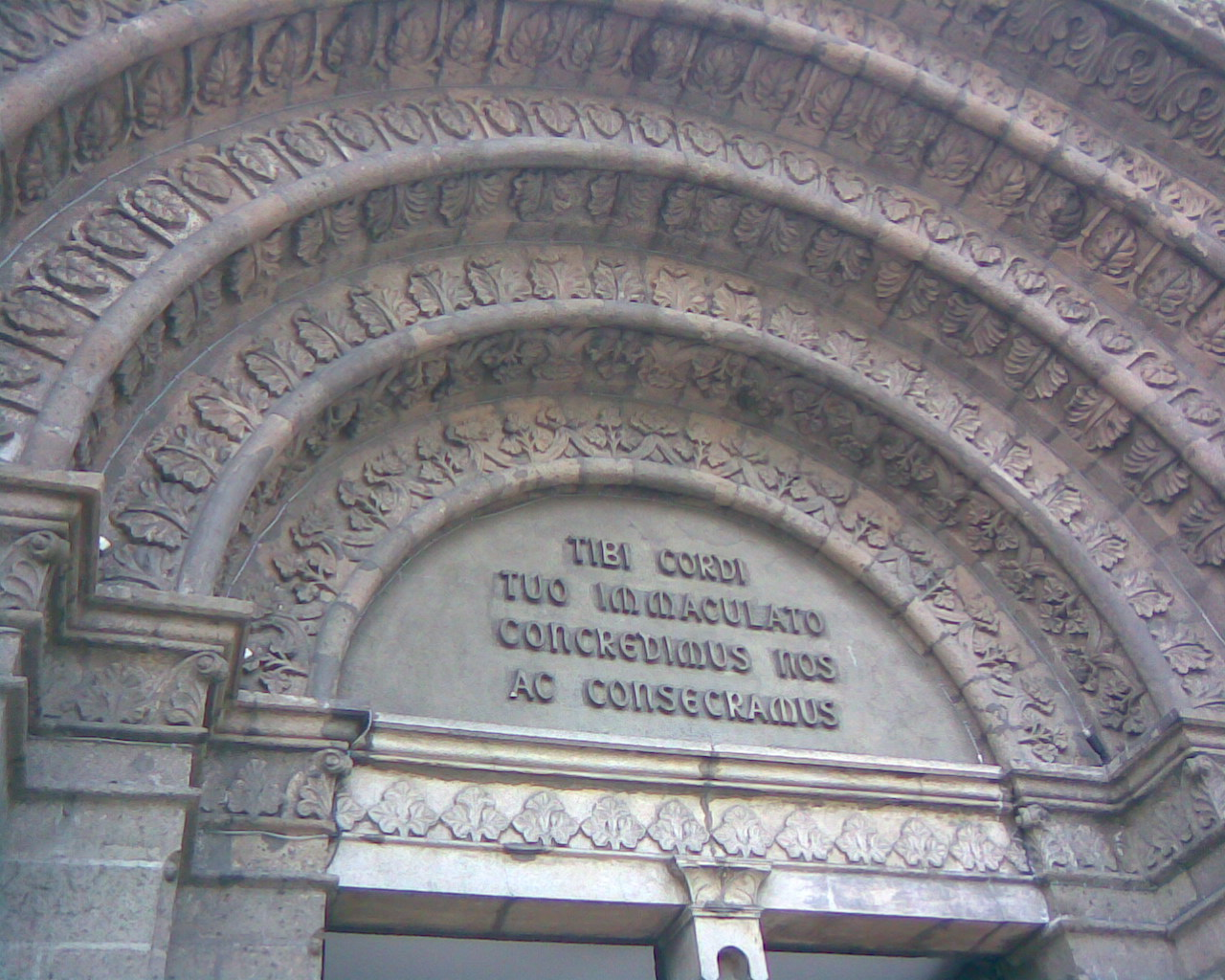
Tympanum of the Manila Cathedral in Intramuros, Philippines

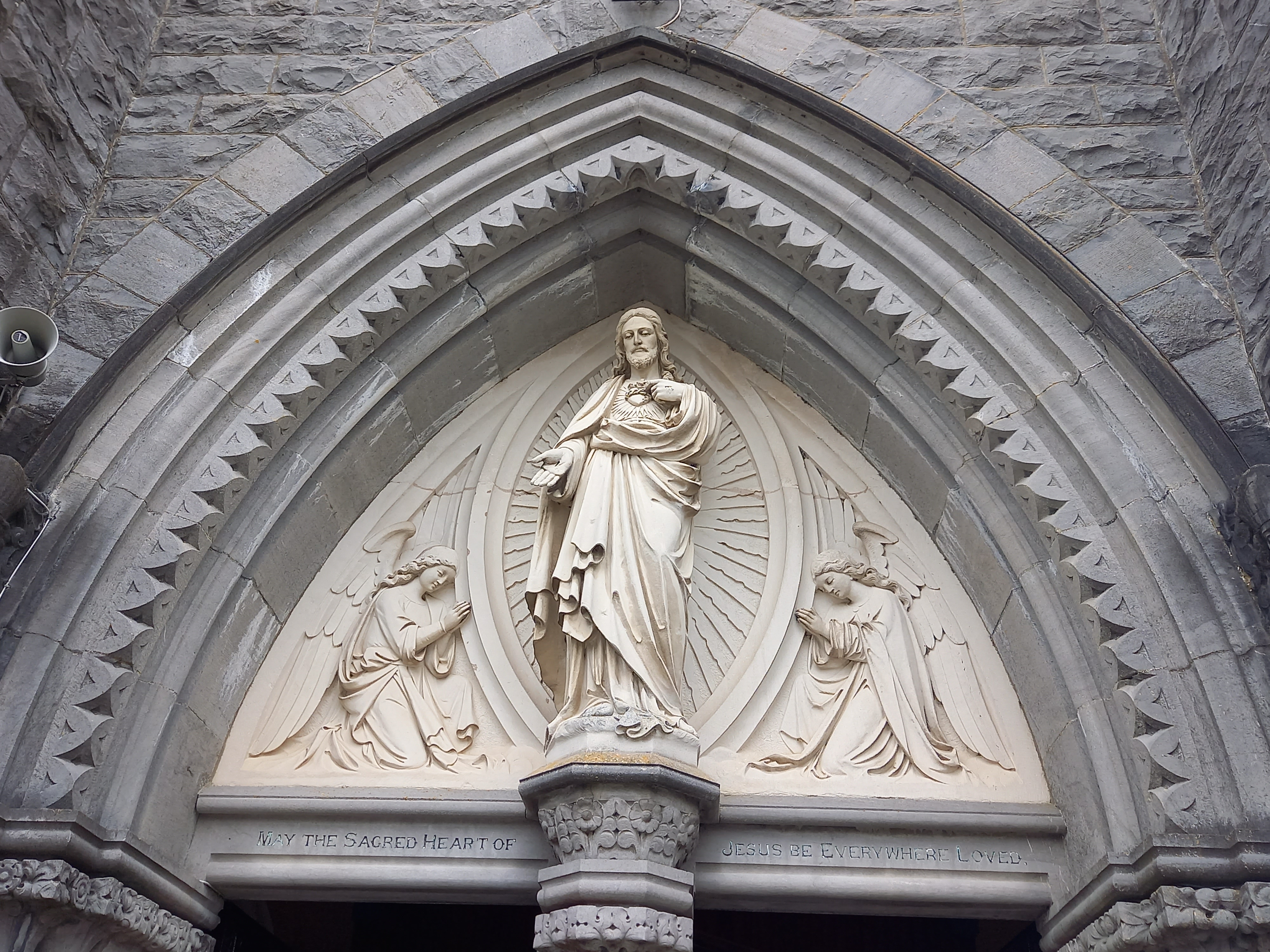
Tympanum of the church of the Sacred Heart, Templemore, Ireland

== See also ==
- Lunette: semi-circular tympanum
- Church architecture
- Gable
- Pediment
- Portal
