= Tordelrábano =

Municipality in Castile-La Mancha, Spain

- Municipality
- View of Tordelrábano

- Coat of arms

- Location of Tordelrábano in Spain
- Coordinates: 41°13′11″N 2°45′24″W
- Country: Spain
- Autonomous community: Castile-La Mancha
- Province: Guadalajara
- Comarca: Sierra Norte de Guadalajara
- Judicial district: Sigüenza

Government
  - Mayor (2019–2023): Francisco Javier Lois Oltra (PP)

Area
  - Total: 11.62 km^{2} (4.49 sq mi)
- Elevation: 1,070 m (3,510 ft)

Population (2025)
  - Total: 8
  - Density: 0.69/km^{2} (1.8/sq mi)
- Time zone: UTC+1 (CET)
  - Summer (DST): UTC+2 (CEST)
- Postal code: 19277
- Province code: 19
- Municipality code: 270

Tordelrábano is a village and municipality in the Province of Guadalajara in the autonomous community of Castile-La Mancha in Spain. Located in the comarca of the Serranía de Guadalajara, it has 8 inhabitants.

It forms part of Stage 10 of the celebrated Ruta de Don Quijote, which crosses through these lands as a necessary place of passage for Don Quixote (Alonso Quijano) on his literary journey to Barcelona. In Tordelrábano, the roads coming from Atienza and Rienda converge. There is an official rest point of the route in Tordelrábano.

== History ==
By the mid-19th century, the settlement had a population of 160 inhabitants and a total of 45 houses. The locality is described in the fifteenth volume of Pascual Madoz's Diccionario geográfico-estadístico-histórico de España y sus posesiones de Ultramar in the following manner:

TOR DEL RÁBANO: a place with a municipal government (lugar con ayuntamiento) in the province of Guadalajara (12 leagues), judicial district of Atienza (1 league), territorial court of Madrid (22 leagues), captaincy general of Castilla la Nueva, diocese of Sigüenza (4 leagues). Situated on a plain, with good ventilation and a cold climate; the most common diseases are pneumonia and tertian fevers. It has 45 houses; the town hall; a fountain of good though hard water; a primary school attended by 20 pupils of both sexes, endowed with 34 fanegas of wheat; a parish church (San Pedro Apóstol) served by a parish priest and a sacristan; and a hermitage (La Soledad). Its boundaries (término) border those of Barcones, La Riba de Santiuste, Cercadillo and Atienza; within its territory lies the deserted settlement (despoblado) of Morenglos. The land (terreno) is generally of good quality; it includes a forest populated with Pyrenean oak (marojo). Roads: local roads and the Navarre‑to‑Madrid highway. Mail (correo) is received and dispatched from the capital of the judicial district. Products: pure wheat, common wheat, rye, barley, oats, firewood for fuel, and good pastures, which sustain flocks of sheep, cattle, and mules; there is hunting of partridges, rabbits, and hares. Population: 36 households (vecinos), 160 souls (almas). Productive capital: 837,500 reales. Tax (impuestos): 50,250. Contribution (contribución): 3,810.

— Madoz 1849, p. 21

The village has a church and a hermitage, both dating from the 16th century. The locality is cited in the Episodio Nacional Prim, by Benito Pérez Galdós.

== Demographics ==
As of 2025, the population is 8, of which 75.0% are males, and 25.0% are females. Adults aged 18-64 make up 12.5% of the population, and seniors make up 87.5%, the highest share of all municipalities in Spain. 100% of the population was born in Spain and has Spanish citizenship.

Historical population

Year	Pop.	±%
1842	160	—
1857	190	+18.8%
1877	212	+11.6%
1887	212	+0.0%
1900	244	+15.1%
1910	251	+2.9%
1920	244	−2.8%
1930	236	−3.3%
1940	189	−19.9%

Year	Pop.	±%
1950	167	−11.6%
1960	112	−32.9%
1970	61	−45.5%
1981	25	−59.0%
1991	17	−32.0%
2001	10	−41.2%
2011	16	+60.0%
2021	10	−37.5%

Source: INE

== Bibliography ==
- Madoz, Pascual (1849). "Tor del Rabano". Diccionario geográfico-estadístico-histórico de España y sus posesiones de Ultramar (in Spanish). Vol. XV. Madrid.
