= Ribatejada =

- Municipality
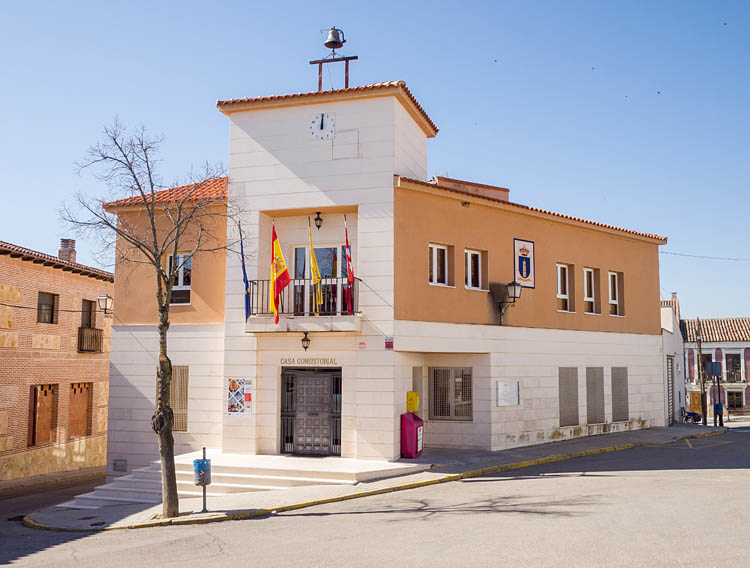
- Town hall

- Flag Coat of arms

- Location in Spain
- Coordinates: 40°40′14″N 3°23′20″W
- Country: Spain
- Autonomous community: Community of Madrid
- Province: Madrid
- Comarca: Cuenca del Medio Jarama

Government
  - Mayor: Carmen María González Escaso

Area
  - Total: 31.82 km^{2} (12.29 sq mi)
- Elevation: 770 m (2,530 ft)

Population (2025-01-01)
  - Total: 905
  - Density: 28.4/km^{2} (73.7/sq mi)
- Time zone: UTC+1 (CET)
  - Summer (DST): UTC+2 (CEST)
- Postal code: 28815

Ribatejada is a municipality of the Community of Madrid, Spain.

Sights include the Church of San Pedro Apóstol, in Mudéjar style (15th century).
