= Cantalojas =

Cantalojas, Spain
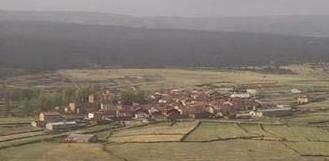

- Location within Province of Guadalajara Location within Castilla-La Mancha Location within Spain
- Coordinates: 41°14′05″N 3°14′47″W
- Country: Spain
- Autonomous community: Castile-La Mancha
- Province: Guadalajara
- Municipality: Cantalojas

Area
  - Total: 159 km^{2} (61 sq mi)

Population (2025-01-01)
  - Total: 121
  - Density: 0.761/km^{2} (1.97/sq mi)
- Time zone: UTC+1 (CET)
  - Summer (DST): UTC+2 (CEST)

Cantalojas is a municipality located in the province of Guadalajara, Castile-La Mancha, Spain. According to the 2004 census (INE), the municipality has a population of 144 inhabitants. The Church of San Pedro Apóstol was declared Bien de Interés Cultural in 1965.
