= Church of San Pedro Apóstol (Villacadima) =

- Iglesia de San Pedro Apóstol (Spanish)
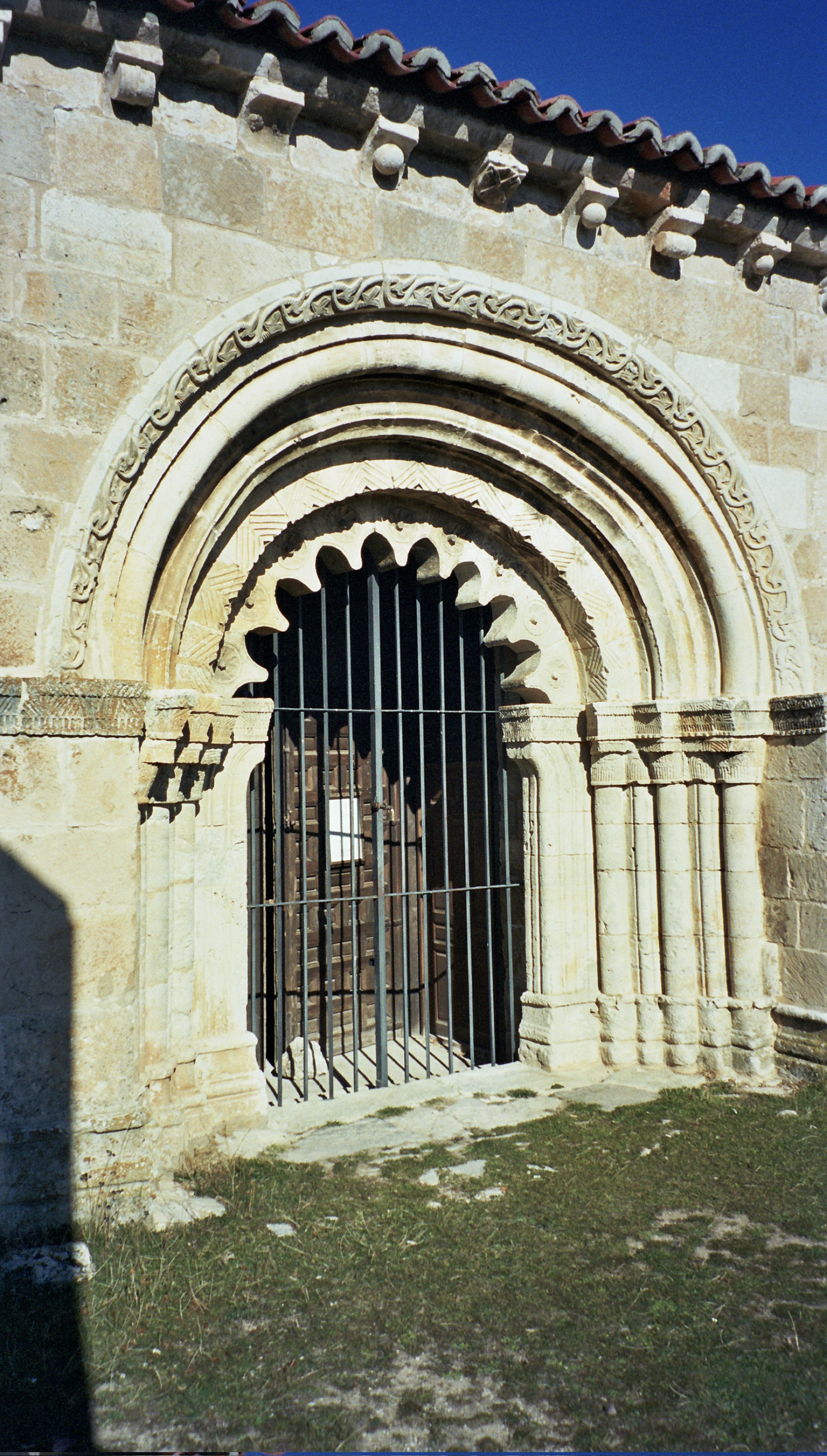

- Location within Spain
- 41.281577°N 3.214526°W
- Location: Cantalojas, Spain

Spanish Cultural Heritage
- Official name: Iglesia de San Pedro Apóstol
- Type: Non-movable
- Criteria: Monument
- Designated: 1965
- Reference no.: RI-51-0001646

The Church of San Pedro Apóstol (Spanish: Iglesia de San Pedro Apóstol) is a former Roman Catholic church located in Cantalojas, Spain. It was declared Bien de Interés Cultural in 1965.

The church was erected in the 12th-century.
