= Church of San Pedro Apóstol (Ribatejada) =

Church building in Ribatejada, Spain

- Iglesia de San Pedro Apóstol (Spanish)
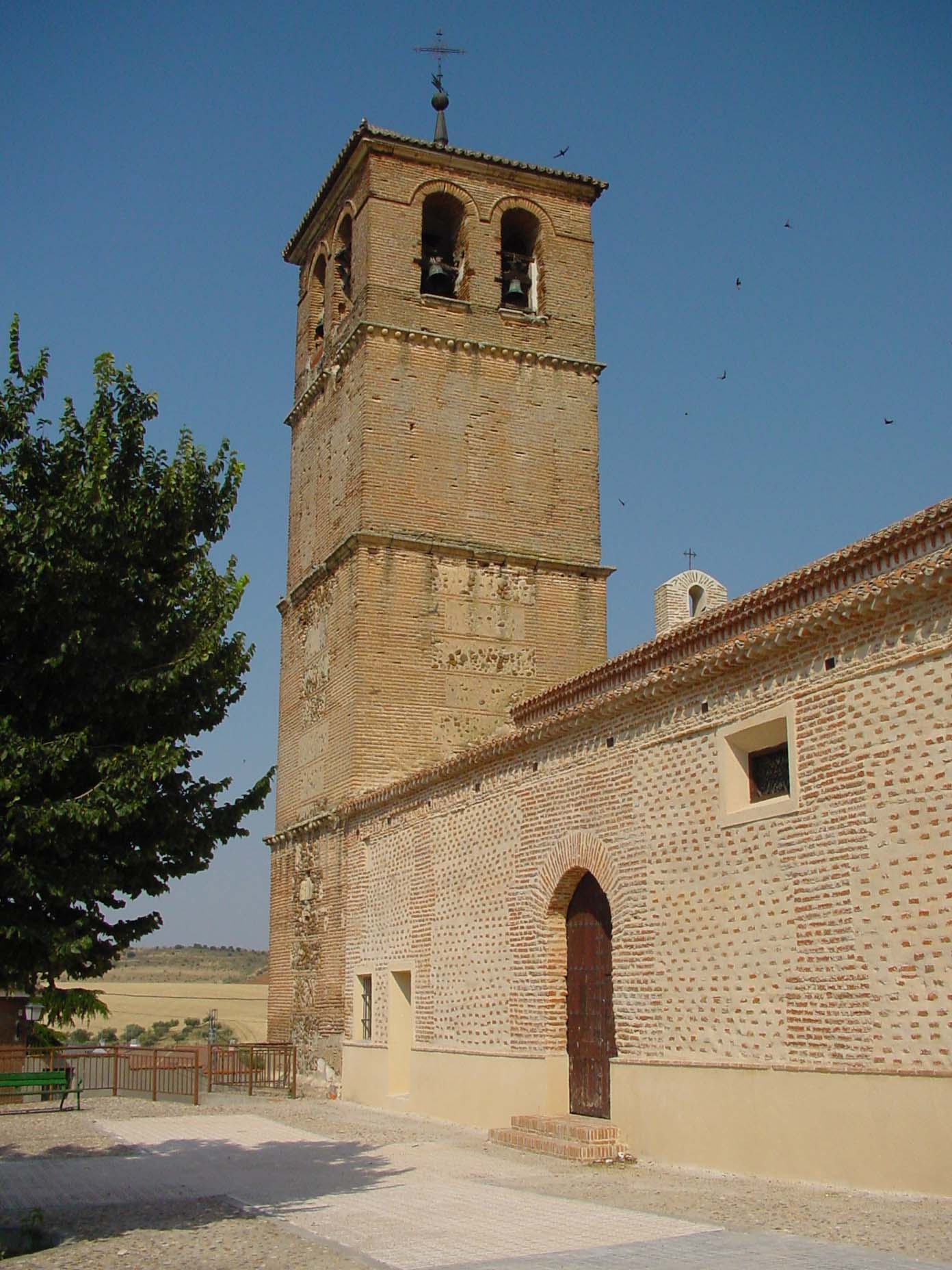

- Location within Spain
- 40.667644°N 3.392855°W
- Location: Ribatejada, Spain

History
- Built: 15th century

Site notes
- Architectural style: Mudéjar

Spanish Cultural Heritage
- Official name: Iglesia de San Pedro Apóstol
- Type: Non-movable
- Criteria: Monument
- Designated: 1996
- Reference no.: RI-51-0009112

The Church of San Pedro Apóstol (Spanish: Iglesia de San Pedro Apóstol) is a church located in Ribatejada, Spain. It was declared Bien de Interés Cultural in 1996.

It was built in the 15th century, in Mudéjar style.
