= Alpanseque =

- Municipality
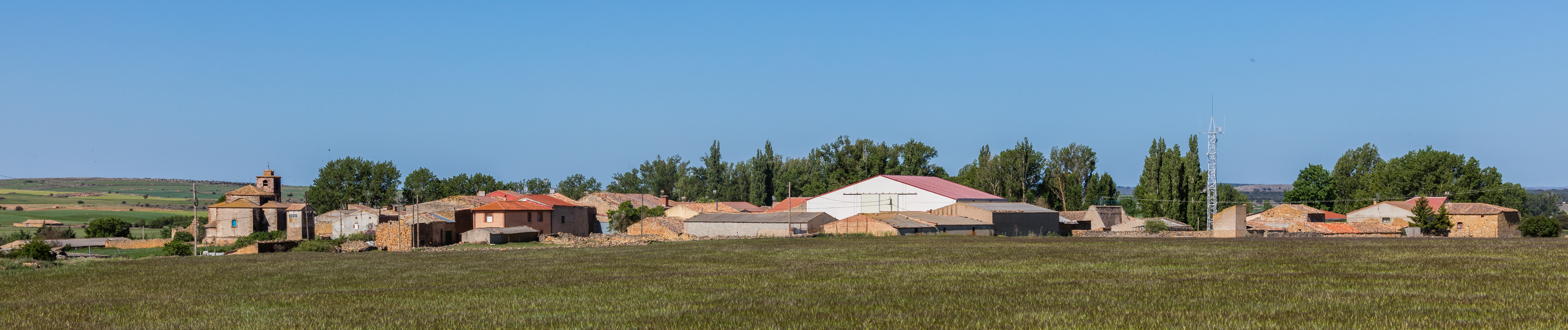

- Location in Spain. Alpanseque (Spain)
- Country: Spain
- Autonomous community: Castile and León
- Province: Soria
- Municipality: Alpanseque

Area
  - Total: 54 km^{2} (21 sq mi)

Population (2025-01-01)
  - Total: 52
  - Density: 0.96/km^{2} (2.5/sq mi)
- Time zone: UTC+1 (CET)
  - Summer (DST): UTC+2 (CEST)
- Website: Official website

Alpanseque is a municipality located in the province of Soria, Castile and León, Spain. According to the 2004 census (INE), the municipality has a population of 98 inhabitants. According to the annual population change of 2020-2023, the change is -1.8%. The decreasing population change has seen its estimated population of 2023 to be 53.
