= Pascual Madoz =

Spanish politician, statistician

The Most Excellent Pascual Madoz
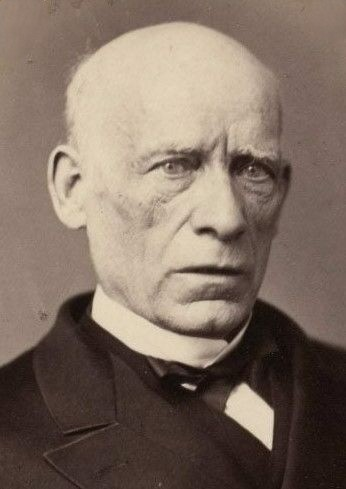

Prime Minister of Spain
- In office 30 September 1868 – 3 October 1868
- Monarch: Vacant
- Preceded by: Jose Gutierrez de la Concha
- Succeeded by: Francisco Serrano

Personal details
- Born: Pascual Madoz Ibáñez; 17 May 1806 Pamplona, Kingdom of Spain
- Died: 13 December 1870 (aged 64) Genoa, Kingdom of Italy
- Resting place: Montjuïc Cemetery

Pascual Madoz Ibáñez (17 May 1806 – 13 December 1870) was a Spanish politician and statistician.

== Biography ==
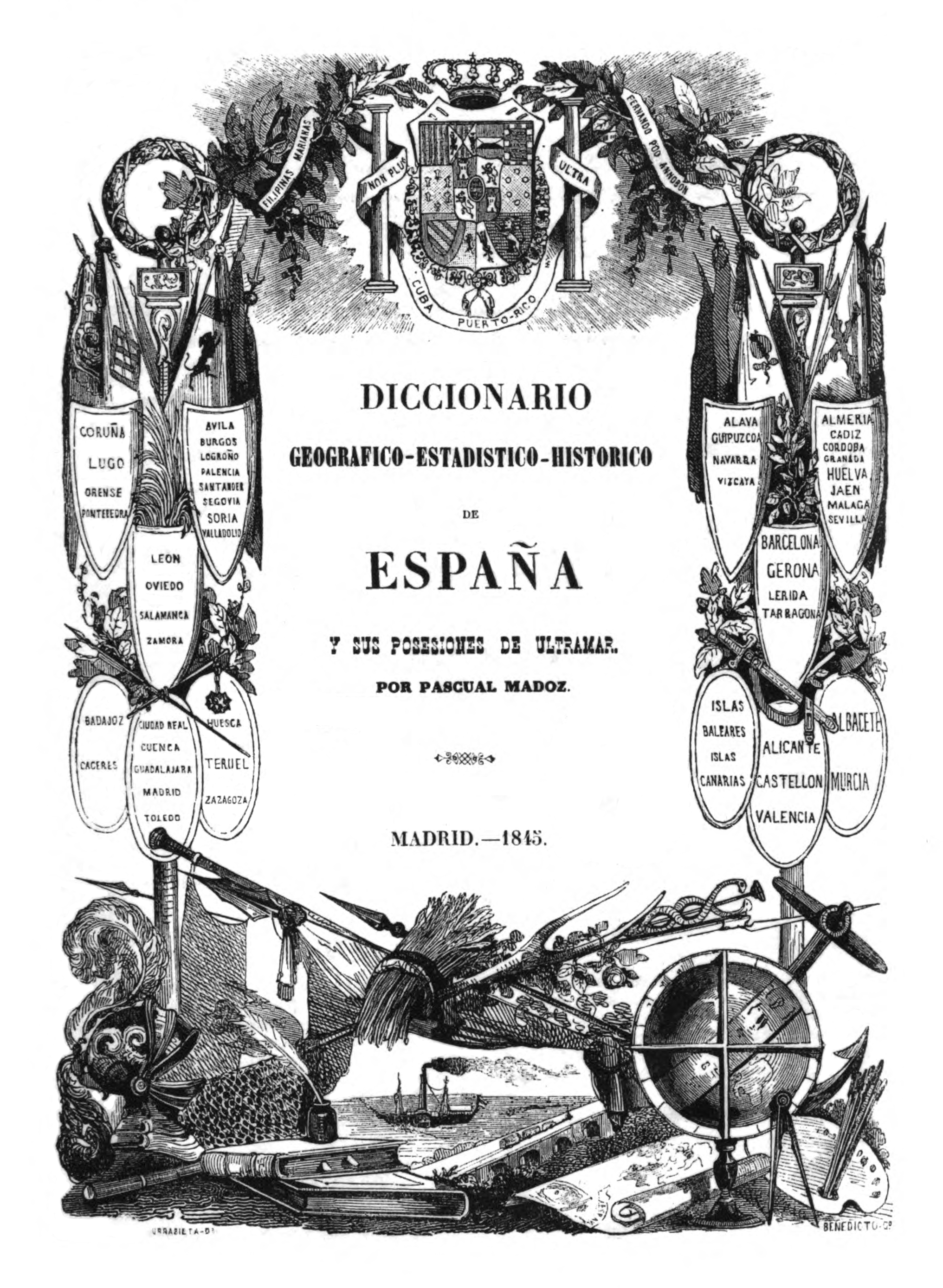
Diccionario geográfico-estadístico-histórico de España y sus posesiones de Ultramar (Madrid, 1845)

In early life Madoz was settled in Barcelona, as a writer and journalist. He envisioned the construction of the Vielha tunnel. He joined the Progresista party formed during the First Carlist War, 1833–40. He saw some service against the Carlists; was elected deputy to the Cortes of 1836; took part for Baldomero Espartero, Count of Luchana, and then against him; was imprisoned in 1843; went into exile and returned. In 1854 after the Vicalvarada he was appointed governor of Barcelona. He then returned to his seat as a deputy, presided over the Cortes, and on 21 January 1855 was appointed Minister of Finance. In that role, he proposed and had passed the civil confiscation law of 1855 which sold off communal lands, Church lands, and those of various confraternities, although he left office shortly after its passage.

Beginning in 1859 he was a member of the governing board over the military retention and enlistment funds. In 1860, he founded and directed the real estate and insurance company "La Peninsular". Unfortunately after initial success, the company floundered leaving Madoz in financial distress. After the revolution of 1868 he was appointed governor of Madrid, but soon resigned over disagreements with the provisional government under Francisco Serrano.

Nonetheless after Amadeo of Savoy was to be offered the Spanish throne, Madoz went as a commissioner to Genoa in 1870 to offer Amadeo the crown. Unfortunately he became ill and died there in Genoa. He was later interred in the Montjuïc Cemetery in Barcelona.

== Works ==
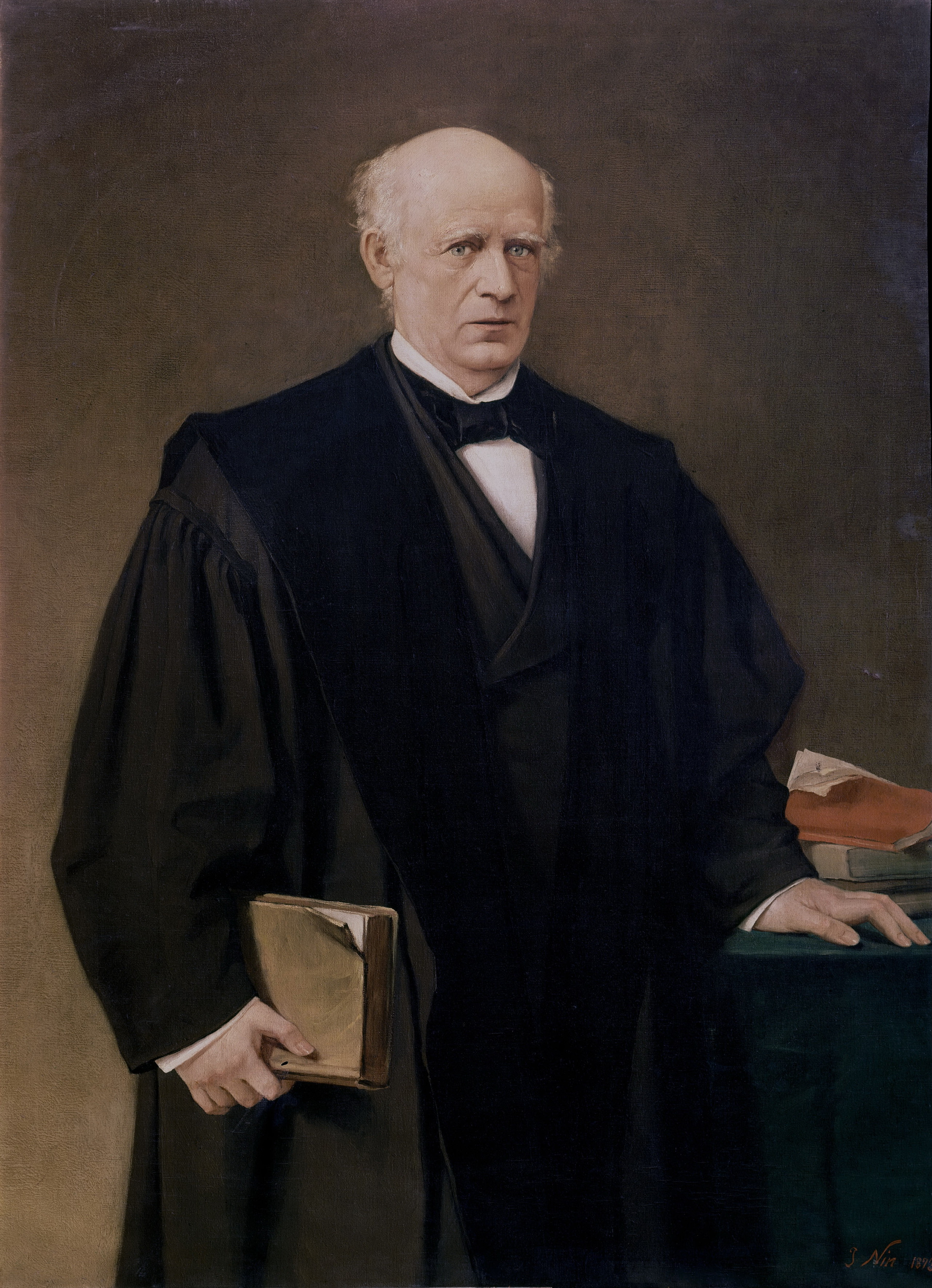
Portrait of Madoz

Madoz was distinguished from most of the politicians of his generation by the fact that in mid-life he compiled what is still a book of value: a geographical, statistical and historical gazetteer or dictionary of localities in Spain and its overseas possessions, Diccionario geográfico, estadístico y histórico de España, y sus posesiones de Ultramar (Madrid, 1848–1850). It, along with his Atlas de España y sus posesiones de Ultramar, are considered milestones in Spanish geography.

== Public recognition ==
In Pamplona there is a street, Calle de Pascual Madoz, named in his honor.
