= Diccionario geográfico-estadístico-histórico de España y sus posesiones de Ultramar =

Geographic handbook of Spain

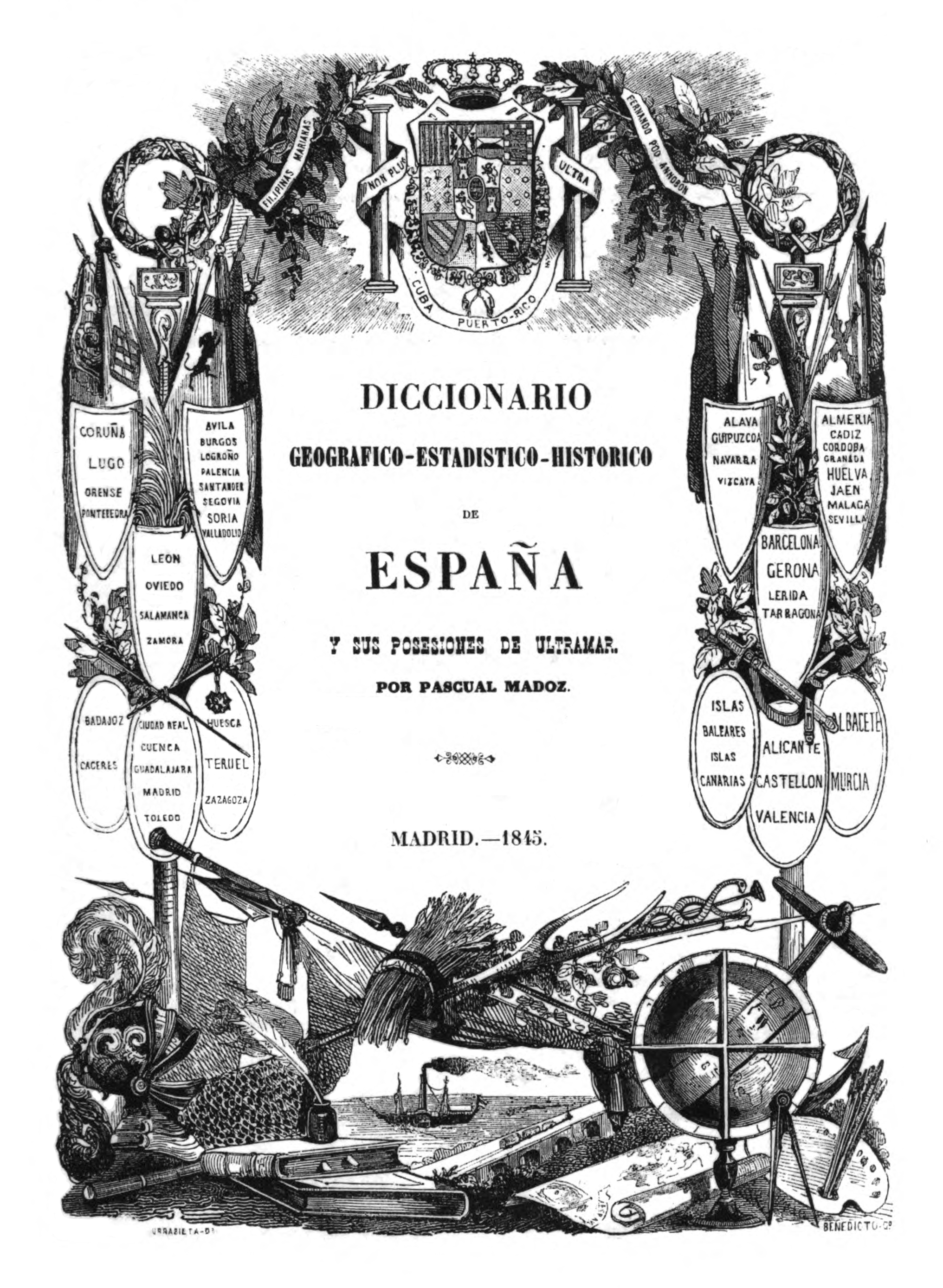
Pascual Madoz, 1845.

The Diccionario geográfico-estadístico-histórico de España y sus posesiones de Ultramar (transl. Geographical-Statistical-Historical Dictionary of Spain and its overseas possessions) is a geographic handbook of Spain. Originally published in 16 volumes between 1845 and 1850, it was edited and directed by Pascual Madoz. A widely known work in Spain (often simply known as "el Madoz"), used as reference work, it stands out in terms of the sheer amount of information, its systematization as well as for covering the whole geography of Spain.

== Index ==
The 16 volumes (including the alphabetical range of entries they cover) are listed as follows:

- Volume I: Aba – Alicante
- Volume II: Alicanti – Arzuela
- Volume III: Arra – Barcelona
- Volume IV: Barcella – Buzoca
- Volume V: Caabeiro – Carrusco
- Volume VI: Ca Sebastiá – Córdoba
- Volume VII: Cordobelas – Ezterripa
- Volume VIII: Faba – Guadalajara
- Volume IX: Guadalaviar – Juzvado
- Volume X: La Alcoba – Madrid
- Volume XI: Madrid de Caderechas – Muztiliano
- Volume XII: Nabaja – Pezuela de las Torres
- Volume XIII: Phornacis – Sazuns
- Volume XIV: Scalae Anibalis – Toledo
- Volume XV: Toledo – Vettonia
- Volume XVI: Via – Zuzones
