= Church of San Pedro Apóstol, Vitoria-Gasteiz =

Church in Vitoria-Gasteiz, Spain

Church of San Pedro Apóstol
- Iglesia de San Pedro Apóstol (Spanish); San Pedro eliza (Basque)
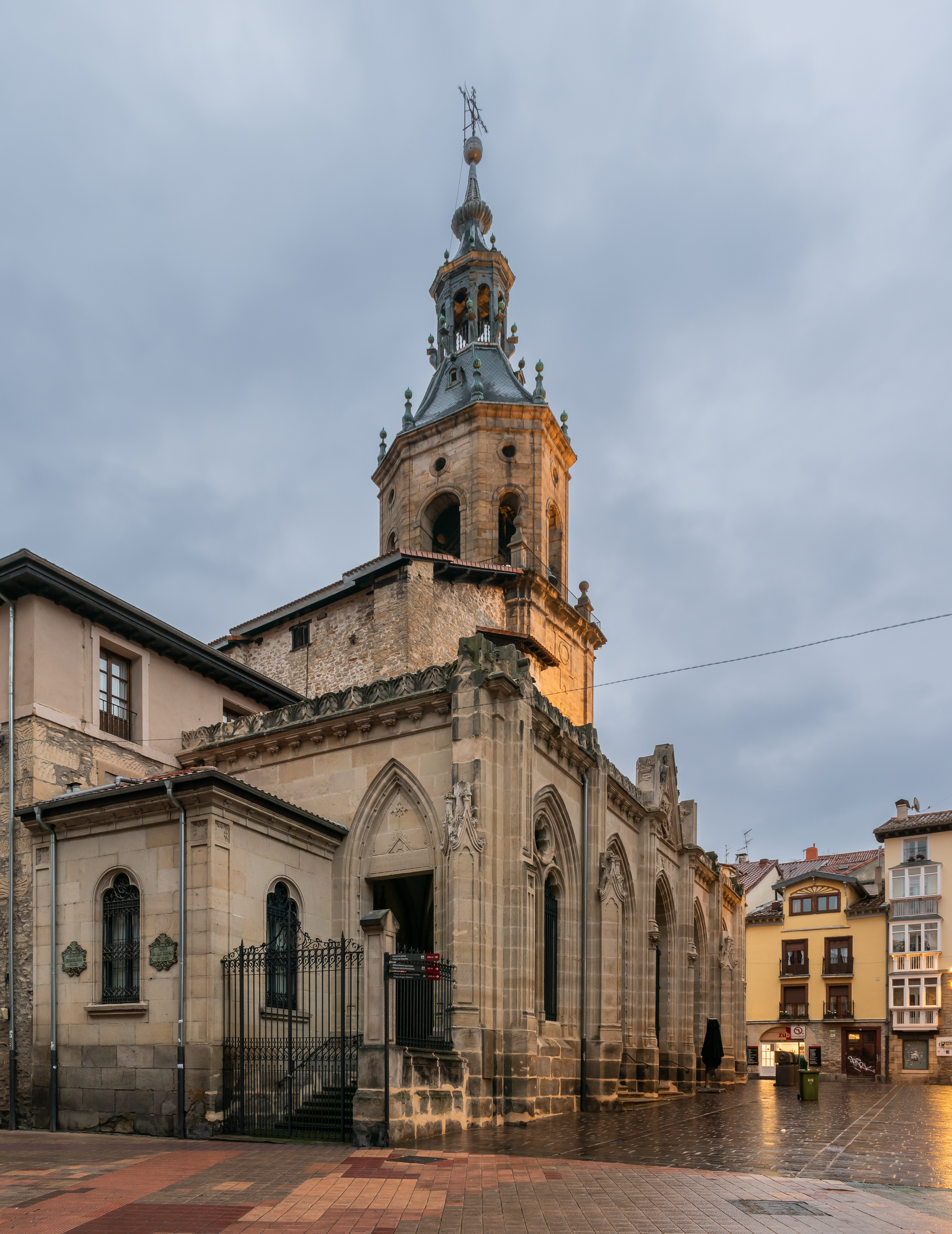
- View from the south
- 42.848135°N 2.674764°W
- Location: Vitoria-Gasteiz, Álava, Basque Country
- Country: Spain
- Denomination: Catholic Church
- Tradition: Latin Church

History
- Status: Parish church

Architecture
- Style: Gothic

Administration
- Archdiocese: Archidiocese of Burgos
- Diocese: Diocese of Vitoria

Spanish Cultural Heritage
- Official name: Iglesia de San Pedro
- Type: Non-movable
- Criteria: Monument
- Designated: 1931
- Reference no.: RI-51-0000360

The Church of San Pedro Apóstol (Spanish: Iglesia de San Pedro Apóstol, Basque: San Pedro eliza) is a medieval church located in Vitoria-Gasteiz, Spain. It was built in the late 13th and early 14th centuries as a fortress church due to its location next to the city walls. The construction of the current tower started in 1708, while the southern portico (designed by Fausto Íñiguez de Betolaza in Gothic Revival style) was added in 1897.

It was declared a national monument in 1931 and is currently classed as a Bien de Interés Cultural.
