= Cuesta (surname) =

Cuesta is a Spanish surname. Notable people with the surname include:

- Alexander Cuesta (born 1966), Colombian musician
- Andrés de la Cuesta (died 1564), Roman Catholic prelate who served as Bishop of León (1557–1564)
- Ariagne Cuesta (born 1987), Cuban team handball player
- Belén Cuesta (born 1984), Spanish model and actress
- Bernardo Cuesta (born 1988), Argentine footballer
- Carlos Cuesta (footballer) (born 1999), Colombian footballer
- Carlos Cuesta (football manager) (born 1995), Spanish football manager
- Ciriaco Cuesta, also known by his nickname Cuestita, Spanish footballer
- Claudia Cuesta, Colombian artist based in Canada
- Damian Cuesta (born 1978), Cuban handball player
- Diego Cuesta Silva (born 1963), Argentine rugby union player
- Elías Cuesta (born 1985), Spanish archer and archery coach, brother of Irene Cuesta
- Esther Cuesta (born 1975), Ecuadorian politician
- Francisco de la Cuesta (1661–1724), Roman Catholic prelate who served as 12th Archbishop of Manila
- Frank Cuesta (born 1971), Spanish adventurer and television presenter
- Gloria Cuesta (died 1987), Spanish aviator
- Gregorio García de la Cuesta (1741–1811), Spanish general of the Peninsular War
- Gustavo Cuesta (born 1988), Dominican Republic sprinter
- Henry Cuesta (1931–2003), American woodwind musician
- Íñigo Cuesta (born 1969), Spanish road bicycle racer
- Inma Cuesta (born 1980), Spanish actress
- Inocente Cuesta (born 1943), Cuban basketball player
- Irene Cuesta (born 1983), Spanish archer and archery coach, sister of Elías Cuesta
- Ismael Fernández de la Cuesta (born 1940), Spanish musicologist
- Jaime Cuesta (born 1981), Mexican footballer
- Jorge Cuesta (football manager) (born 1984), Spanish football manager
- Jorge Cuesta (poet) (1903–1942), Mexican chemist, writer and editor
- José Cuesta Monereo (1895 –1981), Spanish army officer, one of the planners of the Spanish coup of July 1936 that started the Spanish Civil War
- José de la Cuesta (born 1983), Colombian footballer
- Josefina Cuesta (1947–2021), Spanish historian
- Juan de la Cuesta (died 1627), Spanish printer
- Juan Manuel Cuesta (born 2002), Colombian footballer
- Julián Cuesta (born 1991), Spanish professional football goalkeeper
- Lis Cuesta Peraza (born 1971), current First Lady of Cuba
- Lourdes Cuesta (born 1976), Ecuadorian politician
- Luisa Cuesta (1920–2018), Uruguayan human rights activist
- María Mercedes Cuesta (born 1973), Ecuadorian journalist and politician
- Mario Fernández Cuesta (born 1988), Spanish footballer
- Michael Cuesta (born 1963), American film and television director
- Nemesio Fernández-Cuesta (1928–2009), Spanish businessman, journalist and politician
- Pablo Cuesta (born 1962), Cuban water polo player
- Pablo González Cuesta (born 1968), Spanish writer
- Paul de la Cuesta (born 1988), Spanish alpine skier
- Pedro Cuesta (born 1945), Spanish sprint canoeist
- Raimundo Fernández-Cuesta (1897–1992), Spanish politician
- Rubén Cuesta (born 1981), Spanish footballer
- Santi Cuesta (born 1971), Spanish footballer
- Santiago Cuesta (born 1947), Cuban rower
- Tony Cuesta (1926–1992), Cuban dissident activist
- Víctor Cuesta (born 1988), Argentine footballer
- William Cuesta (born 1993), Colombian football goalkeeper
- Yamith Cuesta (born 1989), Colombian footballer
- Yisela Cuesta (born 1991), Colombian footballer
