= Olmeda =

Olmeda may refer to:

== Places in Spain ==
- Olmeda de Cobeta, municipality in Guadalajara province, Castile-La Mancha
- Olmeda del Rey, municipality in Cuenca province, Castile-La Mancha
- Olmeda de la Cuesta, municipality in Cuenca province, Castile-La Mancha
- Olmeda de las Fuentes, municipality in the Community of Madrid
- La Olmeda, an Ancient Roman villa in Pedrosa de la Vega, Palencia province, Castile and León
- La Olmeda de Jadraque, municipality in Guadalajara, Castile-La Mancha

== Other uses ==
- Marina del Pilar Ávila Olmeda, Mexican politician and attorney
- RFA Olmeda, former UK-flagged ship
