= Ablanque =

- Municipality
- Location in Spain Ablanque (Castilla-La Mancha) Ablanque (Spain)
- Coordinates: 40°53′53″N 2°13′45″W
- Country: Spain
- Autonomous community: Castilla–La Mancha
- Province: Guadalajara
- Comarca: Señorío de Molina-Alto Tajo
- Judicial district: Molina de Aragón
- Municipality: Ablanque
- Commonwealth: Sierra Ministra
- Founded: ca. 11th century

Government
  - Alcalde: José Luís Sancho del Castillo (2007) (PSOE)

Area
  - Total: 51.40 km^{2} (19.85 sq mi)
- Elevation: 1,061 m (3,481 ft)

Population (2025-01-01)
  - Total: 70
  - Density: 1.4/km^{2} (3.5/sq mi)
- Demonym: Ablanqueño-a
- Time zone: UTC+1 (CET)
  - Summer (DST): UTC+2 (CEST)
- Postal code: 19442
- Dialing code: 949
- Official language(s): Spanish
- Website: Official website

Ablanque is a municipality located in the province of Guadalajara, Castilla–La Mancha, Spain. According to the 2007 census, the municipality has a population of 157 inhabitants.

== Geography ==
Situated in a hollow, atop a small hill on the right bank of the 8 kilometre Ablanquejo River, which runs south into the Tagus River, there are Roman remains and many acres of pine forest. There is an artificial reservoir and dam, which in summer is filled with people from the surrounding villages.

The municipality borders with Cobeta, and Olmeda de Cobeta to the east, to the north with the territory of the Duke of Medinaceli, to the south with La Buenafuente del Sistal and Huertahernando, and the west with La Loma and Riba de Saelices.

In 2005, the town was hit by a wildfire, claiming 11 lives and charred more than 12,000 hectares of forest.
