= Cuesta (disambiguation) =

Cuesta is a Spanish word meaning hill or ridge with a gentle slope on one side, and a steep slope on the other. It may refer to:

Toponymy

- Castilleja de la Cuesta, a municipality in the province of Seville, Spain
- Honrubia de la Cuesta, a municipality in the province of Segovia, Spain
- Merindad de Cuesta-Urria, a municipality in the province of Burgos, Spain
- Olmeda de la Cuesta, a municipality in the province of Cuenca, Spain.
- Pie de la Cuesta, a beach resort in the municipality of Acapulco, Mexico
- San Cristóbal de la Cuesta, a municipality in the province of Salamanca, Spain
- San Rafael Pie de la Cuesta, a municipality in the San Marcos department, Guatemala
- Ventosa de la Cuesta, a municipality in the province of Valladolid, Spain

Other

- Cuesta (surname), a Spanish surname
- Instituto Cuesta Duarte, a labour think-tank in Uruguay
- La Cuesta Encantada, a Spanish name for Hearst Castle, California
