= Cueva de los Casares =

Cave and archaeological site in Spain

- Cueva de los Casares (Spanish)
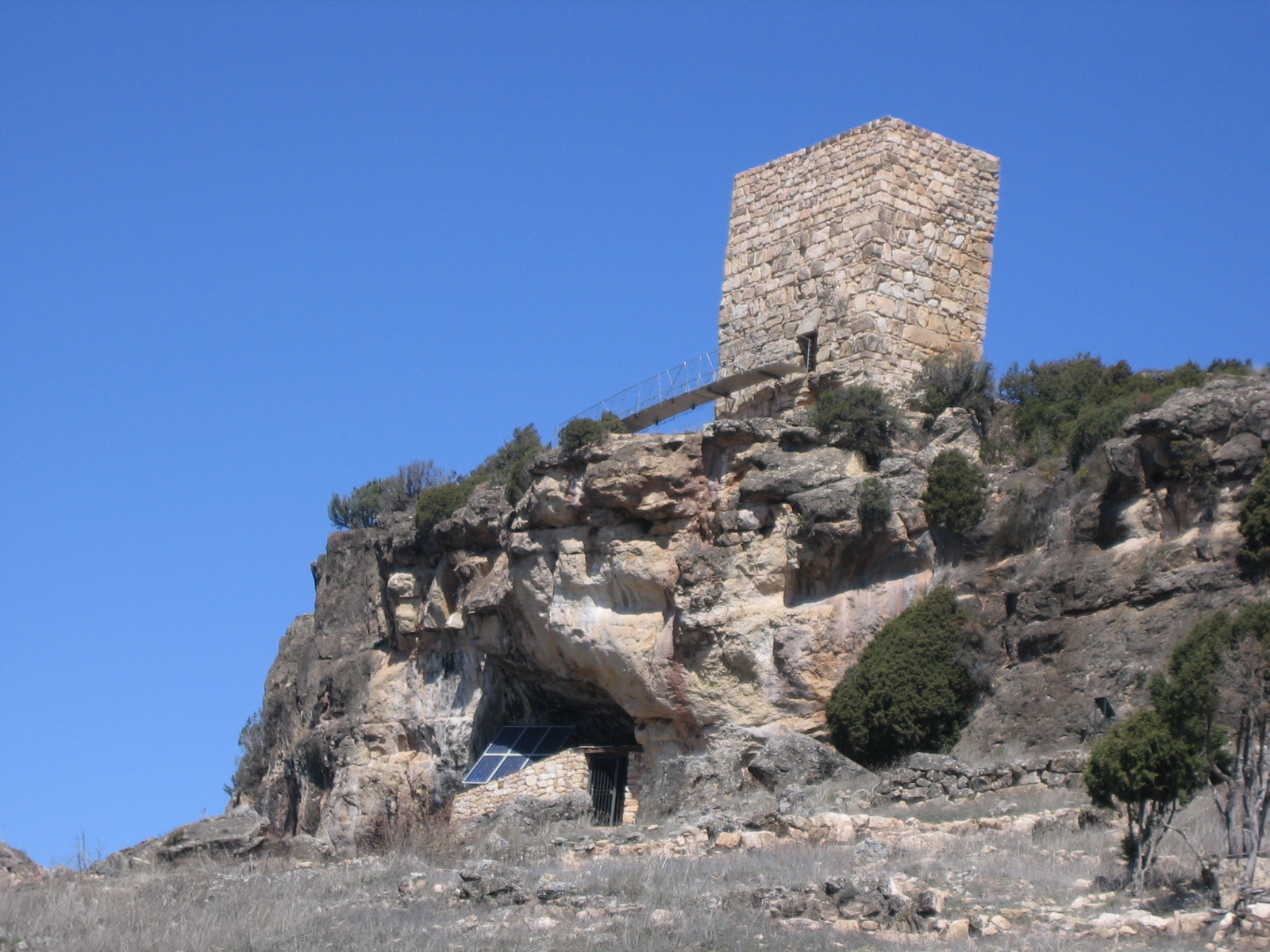

- Location within Spain
- 40.9575°N 2.290928°W
- Location: Riba de Saelices, Spain

Spanish Cultural Heritage
- Official name: Cueva de los Casares
- Type: Non-movable
- Criteria: Monument
- Designated: 1935
- Reference no.: RI-51-0001089

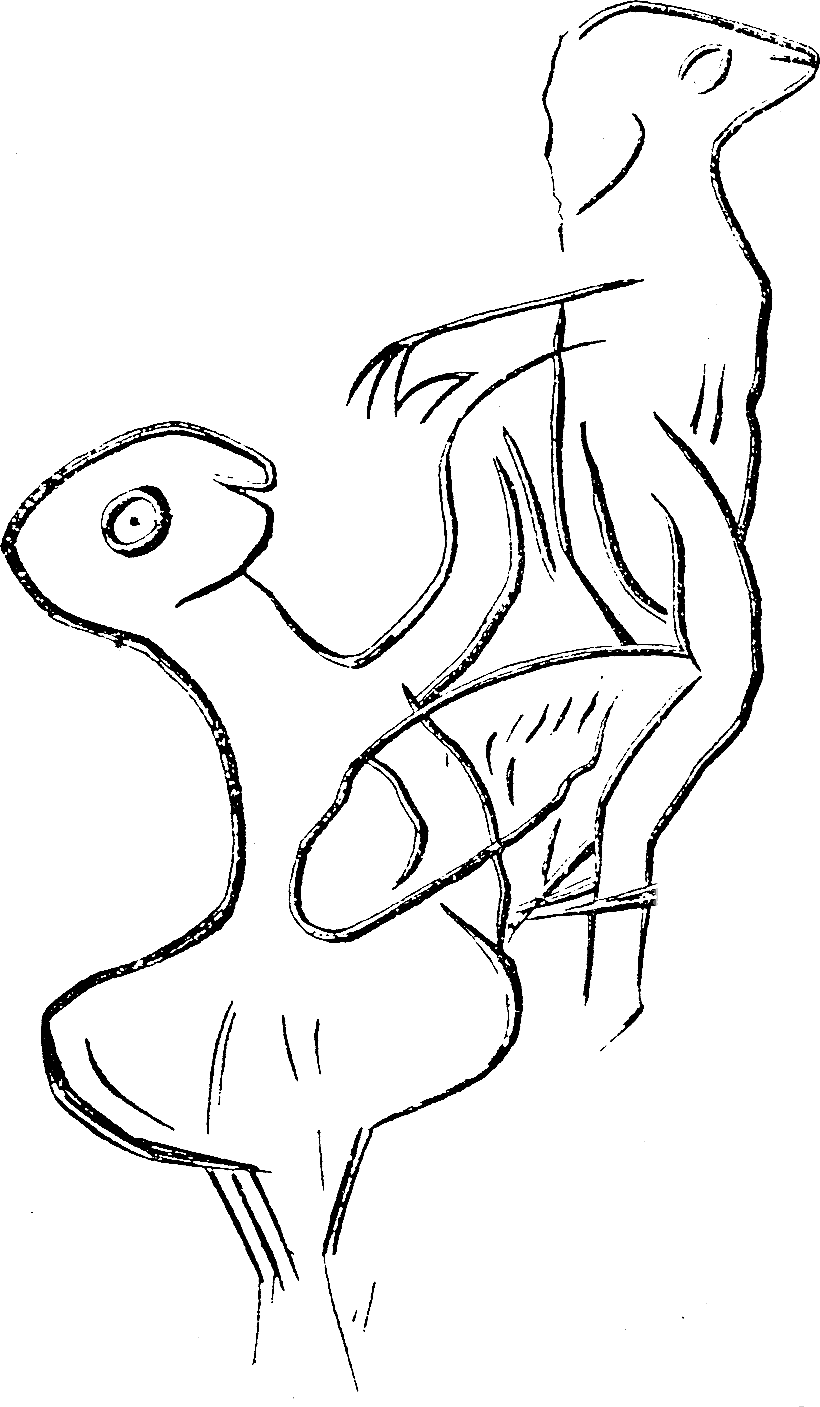
One of the many paleolithic hierogamies of Los Casares, in that representing a sexual act.

Cueva de los Casares is a cave in Riba de Saelices (Province of Guadalajara, Castile-La Mancha, Spain). Discovered in 1933, it contains a number of Paleolithic cave paintings, and is most notable for a series of paintings depicting what some have argued is the earliest representation of human understanding of the reproductive process, featuring images of copulation (perhaps mediated by a mysterious shaman figure), pregnancy, childbirth, and family life. Mammoths and other animals feature frequently in the illustrations. It was declared Bien de Interés Cultural in 1935.

There are many representations of animals, anthropomorphs (human-like figures), and ideograms (including penises, vulvas, tools, and more abstract images).

The cave and its paintings are little known to scholars outside Spain.
