= Alexander Cuesta =

Colombian musician (born 1966)

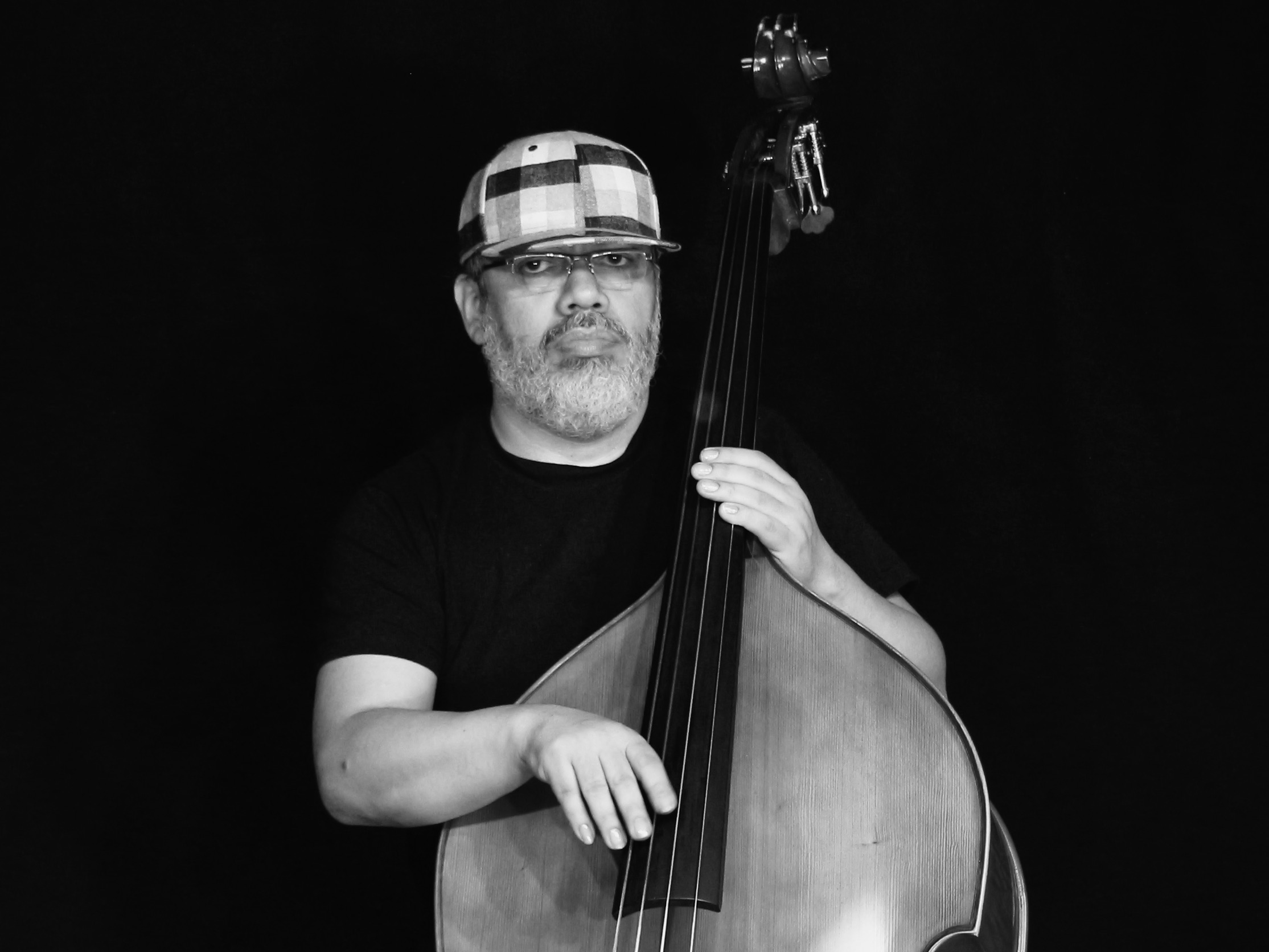

Alexander Cuesta-Moreno (born August 6, 1966 in Bogotá, Colombia). Bassist, guitarist, multi-instrumentalist, choir and band conductor, producer, arranger and composer.

Early studies was given by his father, Maestro Manuel José Cuesta Ramirez and later with Maestro Luís María Díaz, Horacio Lapidus, Luis Becerra, Francisco Cristancho H., Blas Emilio Atehortúa, Dimitir Manolov, Gentil Montaña, Ricardo Marquez and Guillermo Abadia Morales. He began his professional career since he was thirteen years old.

Recognized for his contribution to the enrichment of Colombian culture, projecting new talents in different scenarios, national and international competitions.

== Projects ==
=== Harmony Research ===
Research conducted on jazz harmony: The creation of the Sensitive Theory and development of new improvisation techniques.

=== Vocal Technique Research ===
Research in singing technique, based on the study of the physiognomy of singing and the development of new techniques of optimum delivery efficiency including exercises and working methods.

=== Auros Foundation ===
Nonprofit organization founded in 1996 with the aim to provides musical training for young Colombians, and help them achieved musicians status to a high professional level. The main purpose of the entity is academic, educational, cultural enriching the minds of talented and creative individuals across Colombia the training is developed by teachers, artists and students.

=== Auros Records ===
Director of “Auros Records” independent Studio Productions, renowned for its production of high quality arrangements, recording, mixing, production and art direction which have participated in national and international competitions, being nominated and obtaining awards in production and sound engineering.

The following lists some recordings under “Auros Records” label:

Colombian Music

- Mujer – Niyireth (1997)
- Huellas – Hermanos Cañas Camargo (1999)
- De Norte a Sur – Niyireth (2000)
- Evocación – Edwin Roberto Guevara (2001)
- Como Hace Tiempo – Diana y Fabian (2001)
- Delta Trio (2001)
- Juventud … Colombia empieza en ti (2001); for the Cartago’s Institute of Culture and Tourism and Nadia Foundation.

Latinoamerican Music

- Tiempo de vivir – Dueto Albur (2006)
- Cierra tu ojos y escucha – Jhonny Muñoz (2009); winning album in the Awards “Lucca Prodan de Música Independiente” in Buenos Aires-Argentina.

== Music Compositions ==
His work includes music that was considered "cutting edge" in his time. It is characterized by its great beauty and rich musical aesthetic. His repertoire includes works of different genres. Among them are:

Fragmento del Bambuco "Cuando la vida se va", composición del maestro Alexander Cuesta-Moreno.

Colombian Music

- Theo y Dani - Bambuco
- Bogotá Antigua - Pasillo
- El Mono - Bambuco
- Pequeñito - Pasillo
- Cuando la vida se va - Bambuco
- Mujer - Pasillo
- Mi propia vida - Bambuco

Jazz

- Friends
- Lesson one
- Redención
- Arauca
- Manolo's Blues
- Dame esos cinco

== Awards and Special Recognitions ==
Here are some of the awards and special recognitions throughout his career:

- Silver Medal, Spirit and Faith category, in the World Choir Games, with the "Coro Fundacion Auros". Riga-Letonia. 2014.
- Special Guests as Director of the "Coro Fundacion Auros" at the "14 Festival UNICAMP de Corais", Sao Paulo-Brasil. 2018.
- First Place Winner, mixed-voice ensemble category, in the “Festival Nacional del Pasillo Colombiano”, with the Auros Foundation Vocal Ensemble. Aguadas-Caldas (Col). 2008, 2010 and 2018.
- Recognition of his brilliant career as professor, conductor, arranger, pianist and guitarist in the fields of jazz, Colombian and Latinoamerican music. Your dedicated projection, input, enrichment and evolution of our Colombian musical culture, young talents shaping his musical training in Auros Foundation. Gratitude for their valuable integration and offering Colombian music concerts, exalting the patriotic folk in the “VIII Meeting Teachers sing to Colombia”. Ipiales-Nariño (Col). 2009.
- Recognition Award Winner with the album "Cierra tus Ojos Y Escucha" Jhonny Muñoz artist in the music awards “Lucca Prodan de Música Independiente”. Buenos Aires-Argentina. 2009.
- Alexander Cuesta and his jazz band, special guest representative from Colombia in the “8th University Festival of jazz-FESUJAZZ”. Bogotá (Col). 2004.
- Honorable mention to Alexander Cuesta and his jazz group, as one of the best groups presented in the jazz history of the University Festival-FESUJAZZ. Bogotá (Col). 2004.
- Winner of the “Bambuco National Festival-Luis Carlos González”, with the vocal group “Aquarela”. Pereira, Risaralda (Col). 2000.
- Winner of Excellence in the “Festival Nacional del Pasillo Colombiano” as musical director and arranger of the group “Delta Trio”. Aguadas-Caldas (Col). 2000.
- Winner for Best Guitarist in the “Colombian Andean Music Festival-Mono Nuñez” first electric guitar in the festival history. Ginebra-Valle. 1997.
- Winner for Best Arranger in the Competition “Antioquia le canta a Colombia”. Santa Fé de Antioquia (Col). 1997.
- First Place Winner in the National Composition Competition "Jorge Villamil" with the song "Mujer." Neiva, Huila (Col). 1996.
- Arranger and guitarist for the mezzo-soprano Luz Niyireth Alarcón Rojas in National Festivals, always getting first place, addition to the grand prize in specific cases. 1996–1997.
- Participation in the Jazz Park Festival. Bogotá (Col). 1995.
- Director of the chair of jazz “INCCA University of Colombia”. 1995–1996.
