= María Paula Romo =

Ecuadorian politician (born 1979)

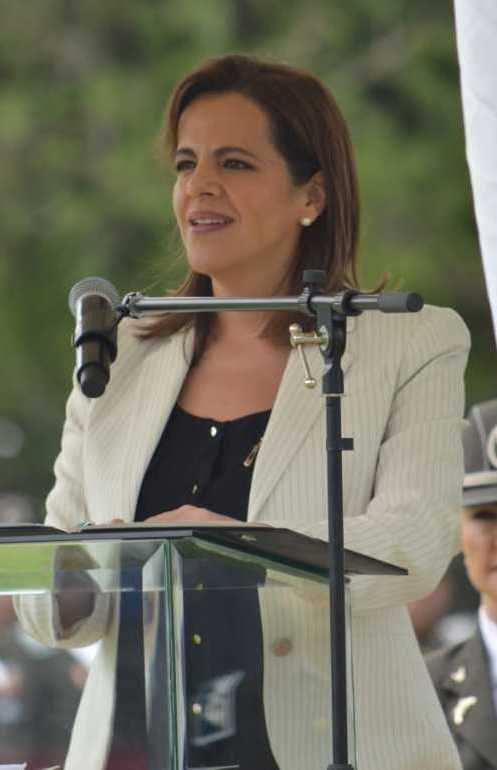
- Romo in 2018

Minister of Government
- In office 31 August 2018 – 24 November 2020
- President: Lenín Moreno
- Preceded by: Mauro Toascanini
- Succeeded by: Patricio Pazmiño Castillo

Member of the National Assembly
- In office 2009–2013

Member of the Constituent Assembly
- In office 2007–2008

Personal details
- Born: June 4, 1979 (age 47) Quito, Ecuador
- Party: Movimiento Construye (since 2004)
- Education: Universidad San Francisco de Quito

María Paula Romo (born 4 June 1979) is an Ecuadorian politician who served as Minister of Government under President Lenin Moreno.

She was a member of the Constituent Assembly that crafted Ecuador's current Constitution between 2007 and 2008. She later won a seat at the National Assembly of Ecuador for the period 2009–2013.

== Life ==
She entered politics in 2004 as one of the founders of "Ruptura de los 25", a political leftist movement that participated in the protests that toppled then-president Lucio Gutiérrez. Two years later, Ruptura de los 25 supported Rafael Correa in his successful bid to become Ecuador's President in the Ecuadorian 2006 general election.

The group broke their alliance with Correa in 2010 after he took actions they perceived as authoritarian. Romo participated along Ruptura de los 25 in the 2013 general election in opposition to Correa, but she did not keep her seat.

President Moreno chose Romo as Ecuador's Interior Minister on 31 August 2018.

National Assembly members Lourdes Cuesta, Amapola Naranjo and Roberto Gómez, challenged Romo saying that she had failed to fulfil her ministerial duties during the national strike in October 2019. On November 24, the National Assembly, with 104 positive votes, approved the motion to censure and dismiss her for allowing harsh police intervention against protesters during that strike. She was also accused of allowing police to use expired tear gas canisters that endangered people's lives during the 11 days of anti-government protests in Quito. The protests were over the removal by President Lenin Moreno’s administration of fuel subsidies on October 16, 2019 and other economic policies in a bid to obtain a loan from the International Monetary Fund (IMF).
