= Villegas, Province of Burgos =

Coordinates: 42°28′07″N 4°01′03″W

Villegas
- Municipality and village
- Flag Coat of arms
- Interactive map of Villegas
- Country: Spain
- Autonomous community: Castile and León
- Province: Burgos
- Municipality: Villegas

Area
  - Total: 24 km^{2} (9.3 sq mi)

Population (2025-01-01)
  - Total: 83
  - Density: 3.5/km^{2} (9.0/sq mi)
- Time zone: UTC+1 (CET)
  - Summer (DST): UTC+2 (CEST)

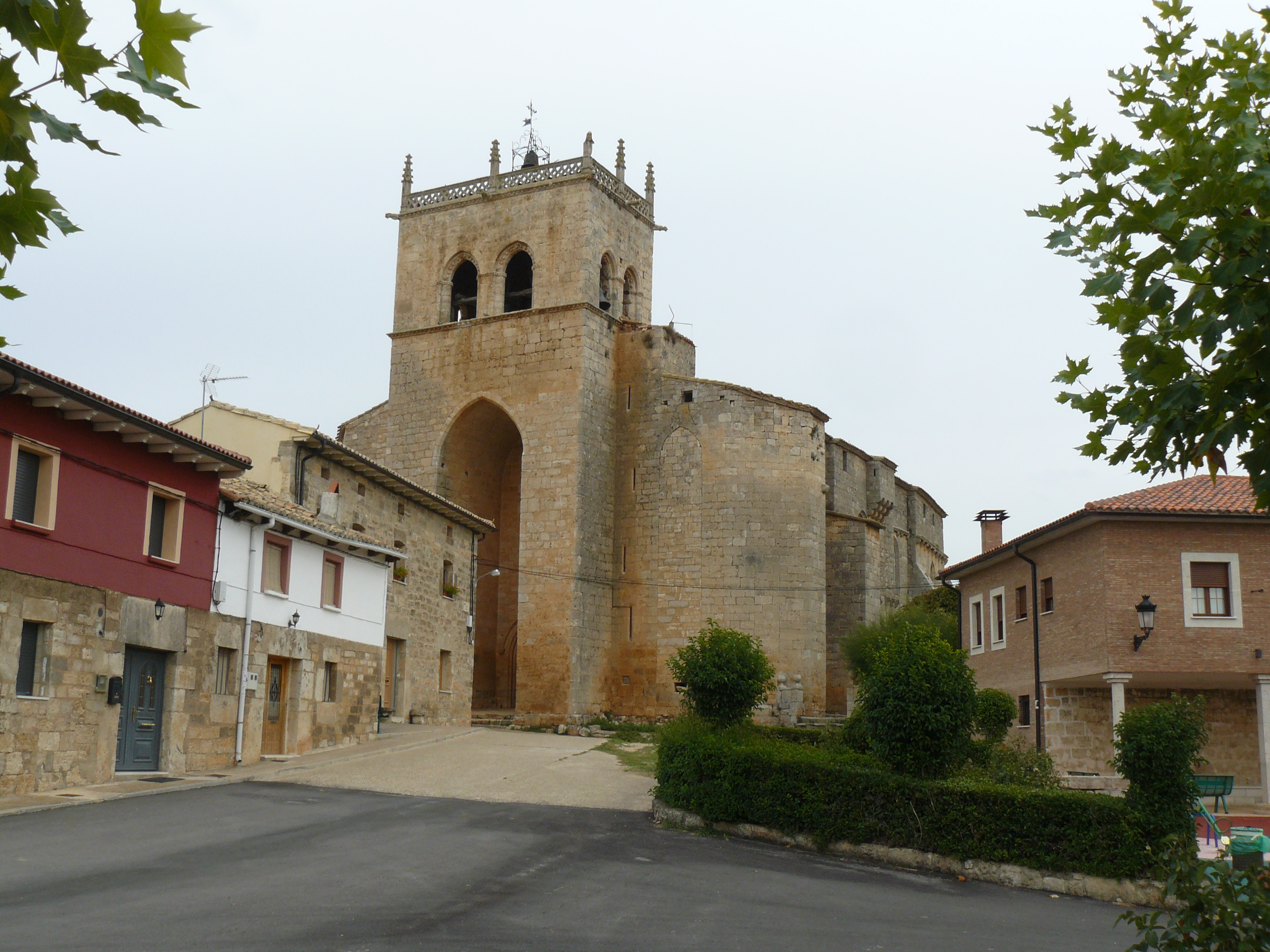
Church of Villegas

Villegas is a municipality located in the province of Burgos, Castile and León, Spain. It is in the valley of the River Brullés.

== Demographics ==
According to the 2004 census (INE), the municipality had a population of 116 inhabitants. Villegas has suffered from demographic decline. This is particularly severe in the case of the locality of Villamorón, a neighbouring village which has been united with Villegas for centuries. It is now effectively abandoned, having only one resident.

== Architecture ==
Both Villegas and Villamorón have churches which are large in relation to their current population (dedicated to Eugenia of Rome in the case of Villegas and James the Great in the case of Villamoron). The buildings have suffered some deterioration, but were given BIC status in the 1990s and have since been restored.

St James' Church, Villamorón dates from the 13th century.

St Eugenia's Church, Villegas is mainly 16th century, but retains some earlier work. It has defensive features including a stilt tower and a machicolation above the south door.

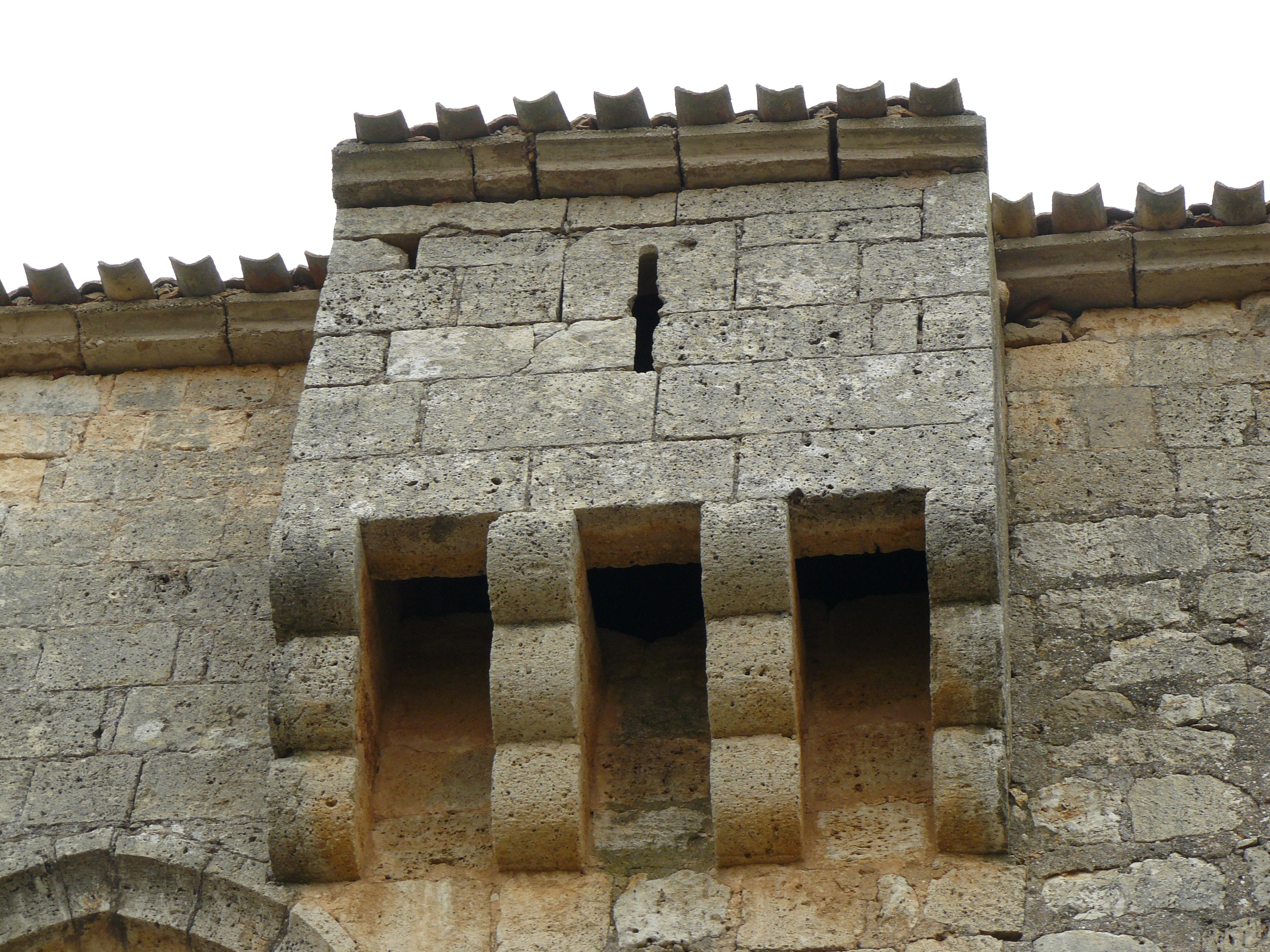
Machicolation
