= Josefina Cuesta =

Spanish historian (1947–2021)

Josefina Cuesta Bustillo
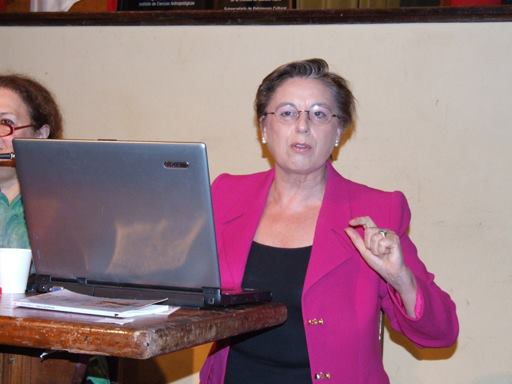
- Born: 4 March 1947; Villamorón, Province of Burgos, Spain
- Died: 30 March 2021 (aged 74); Salamanca, Spain
- Occupation: Historian
- Employer: University of Salamanca

Josefina Cuesta Bustillo (4 March 1947 – 30 March 2021) was a Spanish historian, a professor of contemporary history at the University of Salamanca.

Cuesta was born in Villamorón in the Province of Burgos in 1947. Her speciality was social history and equality of women in Spain in the 20th century. She died in Salamanca on 30 March 2021, at the age of 74. At the time of her death she was catedrática emérita at the Centro de Estudios de la Mujer (Centre for women's studies) at the University of Salamanca.

== Selected works ==
- Sindicalismo católico agrario en España (1917–1919). Madrid: Narcea, D.L. 1978. ISBN 9788427703230. OCLC 9394487.
- Emigración y exilio : españoles en Francia, 1936–1946. With Benito Bermejo. Madrid: Eudema. 1996. ISBN 9788477542148. OCLC 468330506.
- Historia de las mujeres en España : siglo XX. [et al]. Madrid: Instituto de la Mujer. 2003. ISBN 9788477999768. OCLC 55639962.
- La odisea de la memoria : historia de la memoria en España, Siglo XX. Madrid: Alianza Editorial. 2008. ISBN 9788420668765. OCLC 297537783.
- Les intellectuels et l'Europe de 1945 à nos jours. With Andrée Bachoud and Michel Trebitsch. Paris: L'Harmattan, DL. 2009. ISBN 9782296089600. OCLC 495222888.
- ¿Mujeres sabias?: mujeres universitarias en España y América Latina [Femmes universitaires en Espagne et Amérique latine]. With María Luz de Prado Herrera, and Francisco Javier Rodríguez Jiménez. Limoges: Pulim, DL. 2015. ISBN 9782842876500. OCLC 918613869.
