= Gloria Cuesta =

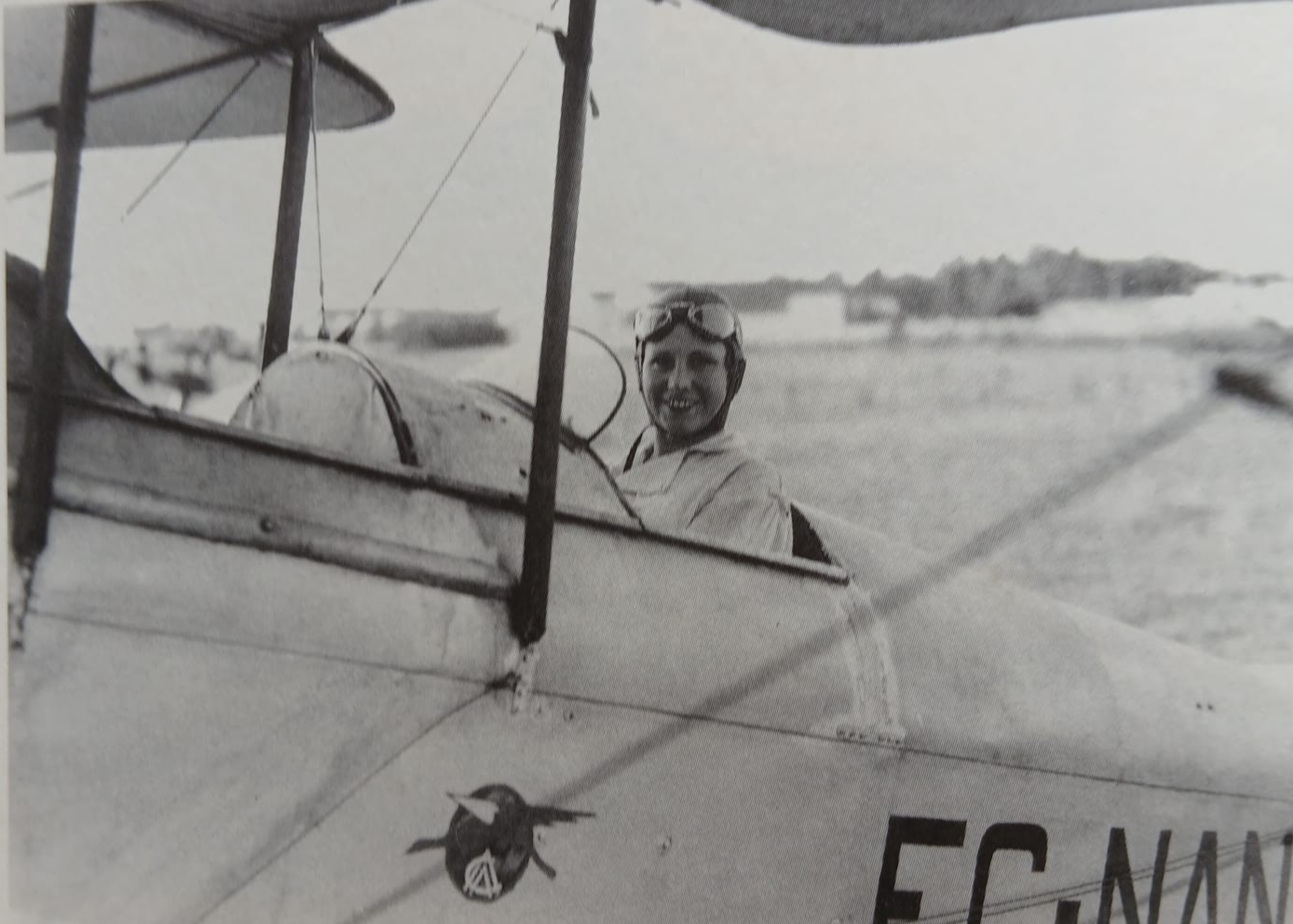

Gloria Menendez Cuesta de Fresno (1911–1987) was a Spanish aviator. She learnt to fly at Tablado Air Field, and was the first woman in Spain to earn a pilot licence. She was a member of the Royal Aero Club of Andalusia.
