= Ventosa de la Cuesta =

Coordinates: 41°25′N 4°49′W

Ventosa de la Cuesta, Spain
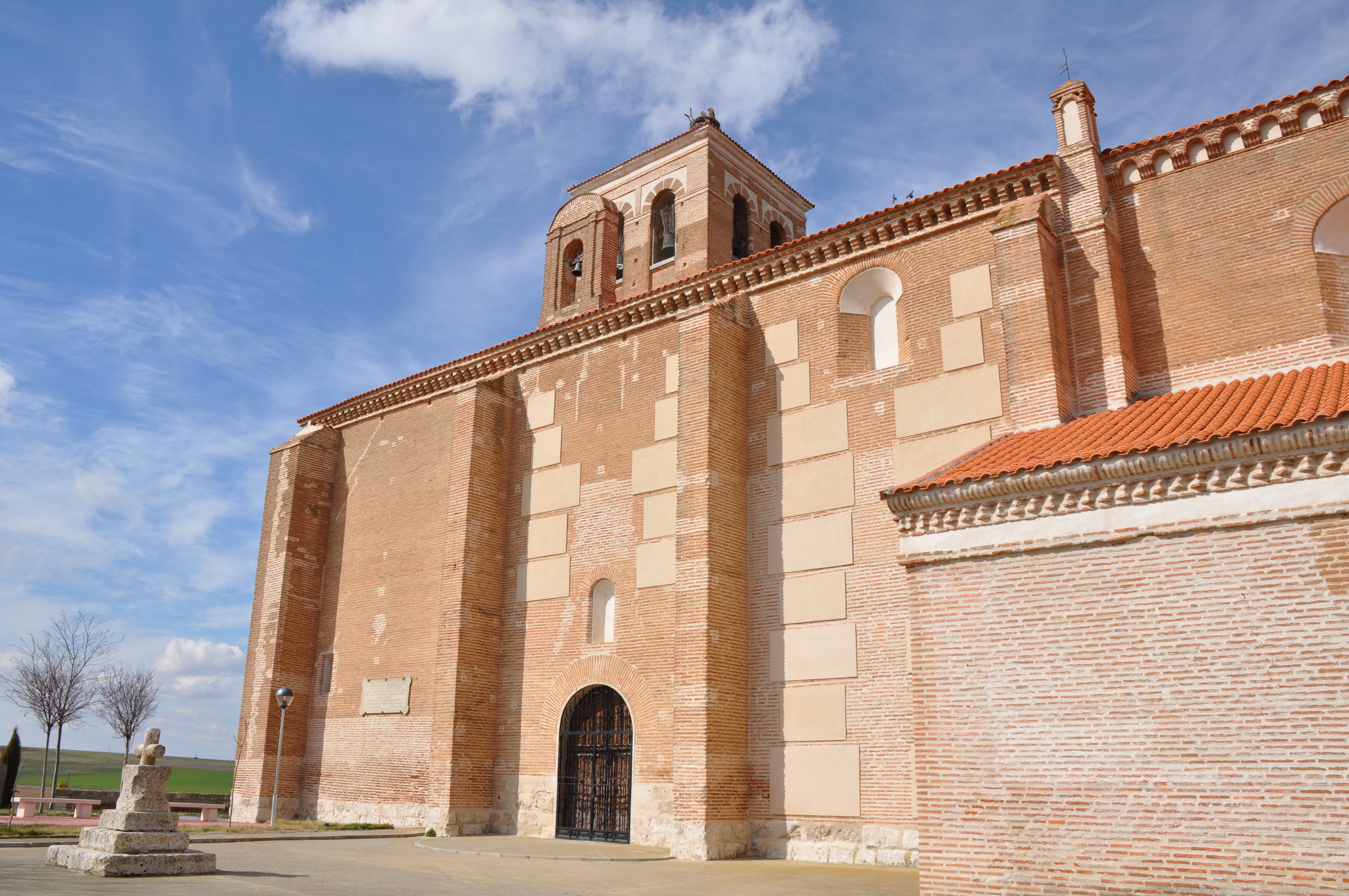
- church
- Country: Spain
- Autonomous community: Castile and León
- Province: Valladolid
- Municipality: Ventosa de la Cuesta

Area
  - Total: 16 km^{2} (6.2 sq mi)

Population (2025-01-01)
  - Total: 110
  - Density: 6.9/km^{2} (18/sq mi)
- Time zone: UTC+1 (CET)
  - Summer (DST): UTC+2 (CEST)

Ventosa de la Cuesta is a municipality located in the province of Valladolid, Castile and León, Spain. According to the 2004 census (INE), the municipality has a population of 135 inhabitants.
