= Jaime Cuesta =

Mexican football midfielder (born 1981)

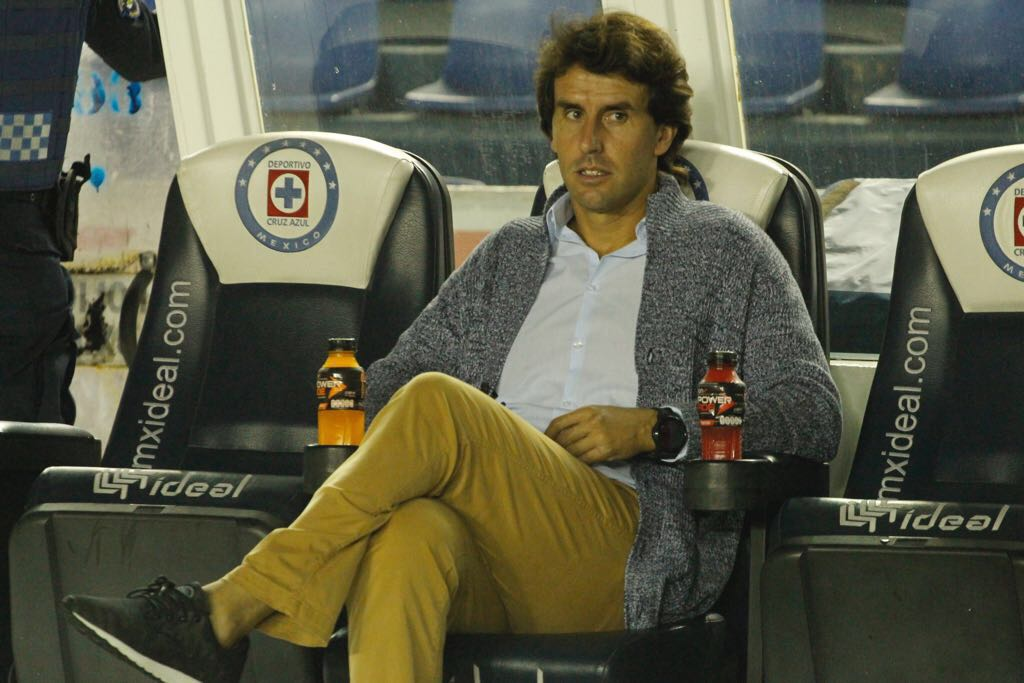
- Jaime Cuesta

Personal information
- Full name: Jaime Cuesta Fanjul
- Date of birth: June 19, 1981 (age 45)
- Place of birth: Distrito Federal, Mexico
- Height: 1.80 m (5 ft 11 in)
- Position: Midfielder

Team information
- Current team: Tijuana U-23 (Manager)

Senior career*
Years	Team	Apps	(Gls)
2001	Celaya	9	(0)
2002–2003	Alavés B	23	(2)
2003–2004	Palencia	4	(0)
2004–2005	Langreo		
2005–2006	Astur		
2006–2007	Toledo		
2007–2008	Univ. Oviedo		(0)
2008–2010	Chiapas	1	(0)
2010–2011	Ribadesella		
2011–2012	Lealtad		
2012	Urraca		

Managerial career
- 2017: Zacatepec (Assistant)
- 2020: Querétaro Reserves and Academy
- 2021: Cruz Azul Reserves and Academy
- 2021–: Tijuana Reserves and Academy
- * Club domestic league appearances and goals as of July 25, 2009

Jaime Cuesta (born June 19, 1981, in Distrito Federal) is a Mexican professional football midfielder who currently plays for Chiapas in the Primera División de México.

== Career ==
Atlético Celaya, Primera A (Summer 2001 - Winter 2001)

Acapulco, Primera A (2002)

Deportivo Alavés B, (2002–2003)

CF Palencia (2003–2004)

Langreo (2004–2005)

Astur CF (2005–2006)

CD Toledo (2006–2007)

AD Universidad de Oviedo (2007–2008)

Jaguares (Opening 2009)

Ribadesella CF (2011–Actually)
