= Cobeta =

Cobeta, Spain
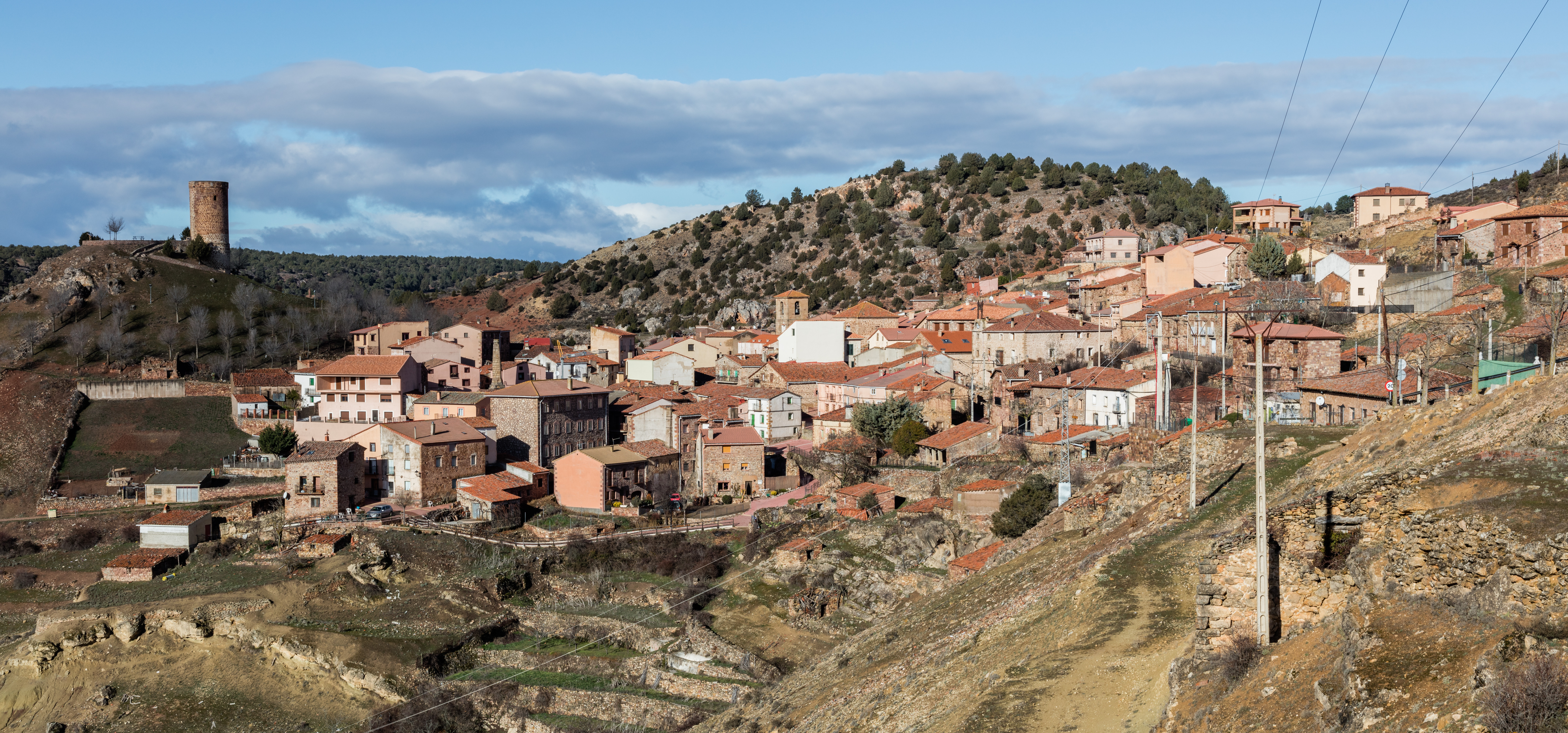

- Flag Coat of arms

- Location within Province of Guadalajara Location within Castilla-La Mancha Location within Spain
- Coordinates: 40°52′00″N 2°08′28″W
- Country: Spain
- Autonomous community: Castile-La Mancha
- Province: Guadalajara
- Municipality: Cobeta

Area
  - Total: 43 km^{2} (17 sq mi)

Population (2025-01-01)
  - Total: 100
  - Density: 2.3/km^{2} (6.0/sq mi)
- Time zone: UTC+1 (CET)
  - Summer (DST): UTC+2 (CEST)

Cobeta is a municipality located in the province of Guadalajara, Castile-La Mancha, Spain. According to the 2004 census (INE), the municipality has a population of 108 inhabitants.

Its origins can be traced back to the Christian repopulation of the area, belonging from its beginning to the dominion of the Lara family; in 1153 Don Manrique and his wife Doña Ermesenda donated Cobeta to the cathedral chapter of Sigüenza.
