= Olmeda del Rey =

- Municipality
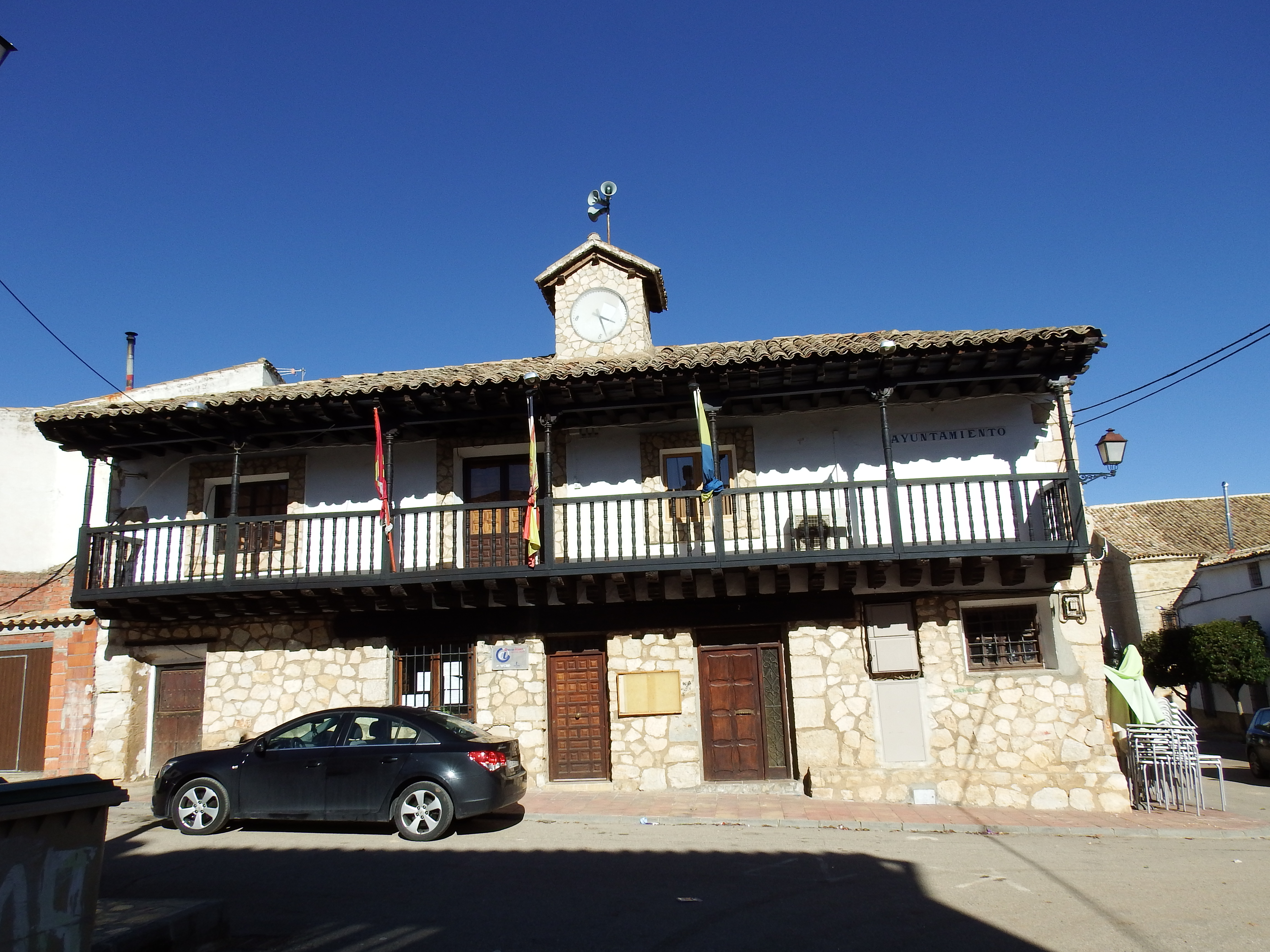

- Coat of arms

- Location within Spain Location within Castilla-La Mancha
- Coordinates: 39°48′N 2°05′W
- Country: Spain
- Autonomous community: Castile-La Mancha
- Province: Cuenca

Population (2025-01-01)
  - Total: 129
- Time zone: UTC+1 (CET)
  - Summer (DST): UTC+2 (CEST)

Olmeda del Rey is a municipality in Cuenca, Castile-La Mancha, Spain. It has an area of 75.44 km^{2} and in 2017, its population was estimated at 132.
