= Lourdes Cuesta =

Ecuadorian politician

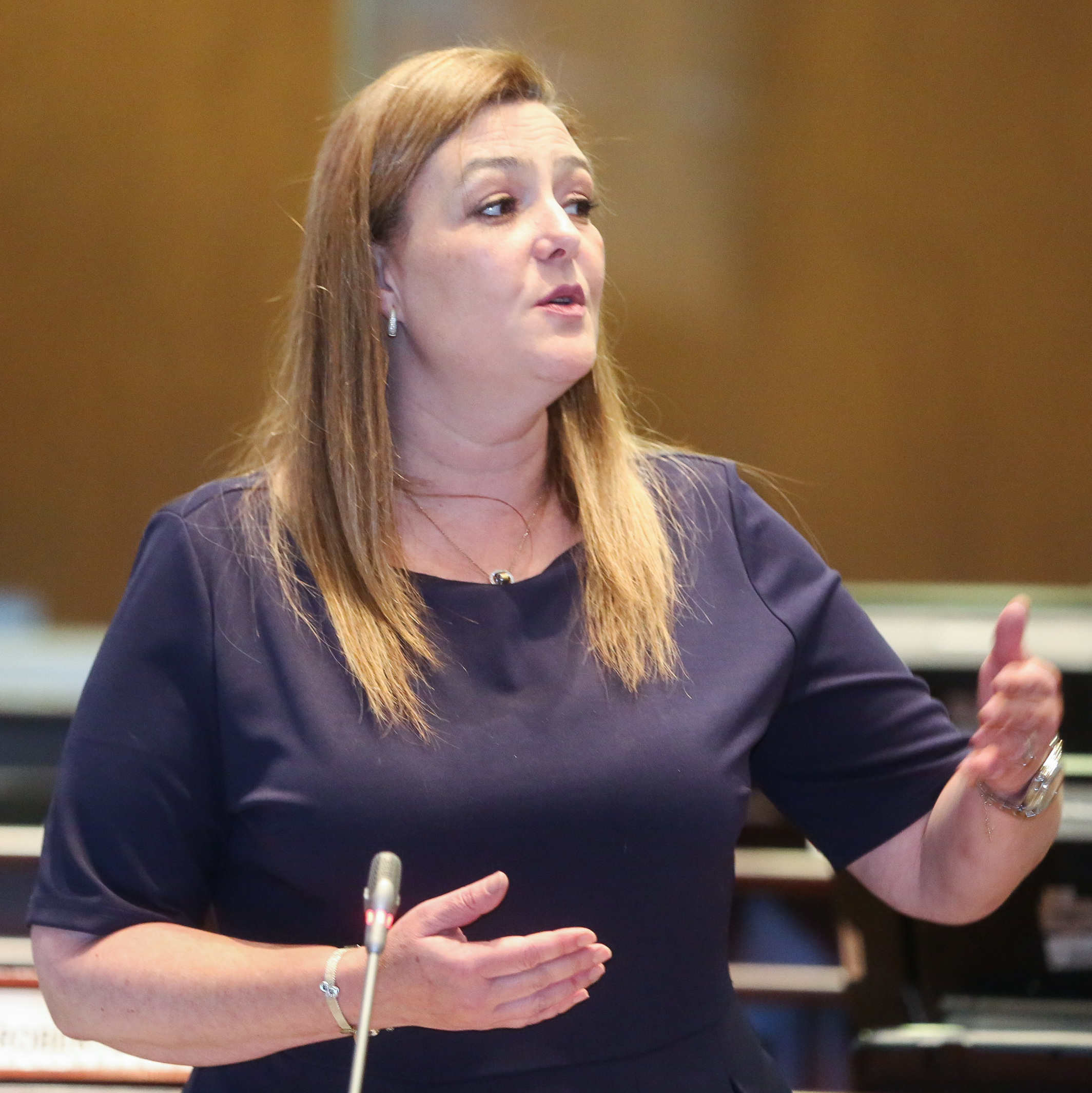
- in 2019
- Occupation: politician
- Political party: Social Christian Party

María de Lourdes Cuesta Orellana (born 5 October 1976) is an Ecuadorian politician who was a member of the CREO party until she left. She stood again for election for the Social Christian Party. She represents the Province of Azuay.

== Life ==
She was one of the founders of the Creating Opportunities (CREO) party in Ecuador.

In 2018 she was encouraging the administration to investigate the travels of the Presidential plane while it was controlled by former President Rafael Correa. She noted that this was a duty and other regimes had found evidence of wrongdoing by looking at travel records.

In January 2019 the government of Nicolás Maduro took power in Venezuela. Cuesta moved that the National Assembly should not acknowledge the recent inauguration of Nicolás Maduro as president but they should declare their support instead for the people of Venezuela and the recently arrested President Juan Guaidó. The National Assembly supported her motion.

In April Cuesra announced that she was leaving the CREO party. She said that she still supported the leaders of CREO but she believed that she could achieve more as an independent.

In 2020 she, Amapola Naranjo and Roberto Gómez, challenged the government minister María Paula Romo that she had failed to fulfil her duties during the national strike in October 2019. On November 24, the National Assembly, with 104 positive votes, approved the motion to censure and dismiss Romo for allowing harsh police intervention against protesters during that strike. She was also accused of allowing police to use expired tear gas canisters that endangered people's lives during the eleven days of anti-government protests in Quito.

During the COVID-19 pandemic in Ecuador in August 2020, Cuesta was one of the assembly members who demanded work from the Ministry of Public Health to report on the state of citizens with other diseases. The work was to be directed by the acting minister Juan Carlos Zevallos and completed in 30 days. This instruction was made through a draft resolution that was accepted in a vote of 121 affirmative votes from 123 assembly members present.
