= Gentil Montaña =

Gentil Montaña (1942 in Ibagué – 2011), was a classical guitarist and composer from Colombia. He was the director of the Fundación Gentil Montaña.

== Compositions ==
Most notable among his compositions are five suites for guitar which include several popular Colombian dances such as the Bambuco, Guabina and Porro, as well as other Latin American dances such as the Cancion.

== Recordings ==
- Montaña plays Montaña Vol.1 (rec. 2005 Caroni Music)
