= Luisa Cuesta =

Uruguayan human rights activist

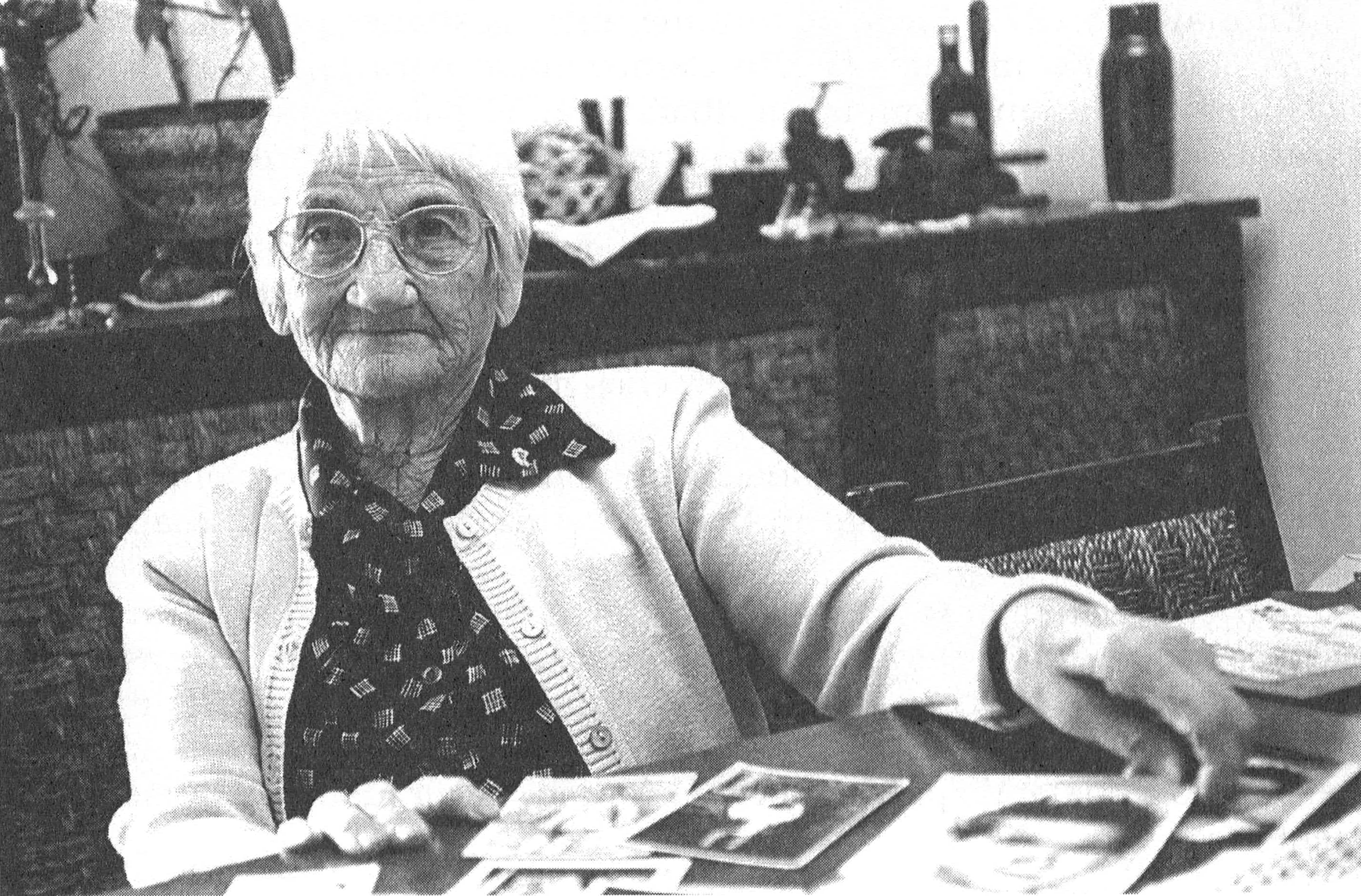
- Born: Soriano Department
- Died: 21 November 2018
- Occupation: Human rights defender

Maria Luisa Cuesta Vila (26 May 1920 Soriano - 21 November 2018 Montevideo) was an Uruguayan human rights activist. She dedicated herself to the search for missing detainees during the Uruguayan military dictatorship. Her son Nebio Melo Cuesta disappeared during that period and is still missing today.

== Life ==
She was born in Soriano, where she worked in a sheet and paint workshop until June 1973. On June 28, 1973 until January 31, 1974 she was imprisoned from in the Infantry Battalion No. 5. Her son, Nebio Melo Cuesta, went into exile in Argentina with his wife and daughter. In 1976, Nebio was arrested in Buenos Aires and later disappeared. This was in the times of the Uruguayan dictatorship of 1973-1985.

Cuesta emigrated to Netherlands with the rest of her family in 1977. She came back in 1985 after the regime has ended and new democratic election was held. In the following years she led a group of families of people that disappeared during the Uruguayan dictatorship. One of her activities included leading a yearly March of Silence gathering hundreds of people in Uruguay. In 2012 she was awarded a title of Illustrious Citizen by the Municipality of Montevideo. In 2013 for her contribution to the fight for human rights she received a Doctor Honoris Causa title from the University of the Republic.

A civic centre in Casavalle was inaugurated in her name in 2015 and continues to bare her named today. Same year she suffered a stroke and was not able to attend 20 March of Silence.
