= Stilt tower =

Danish Medieval church tower

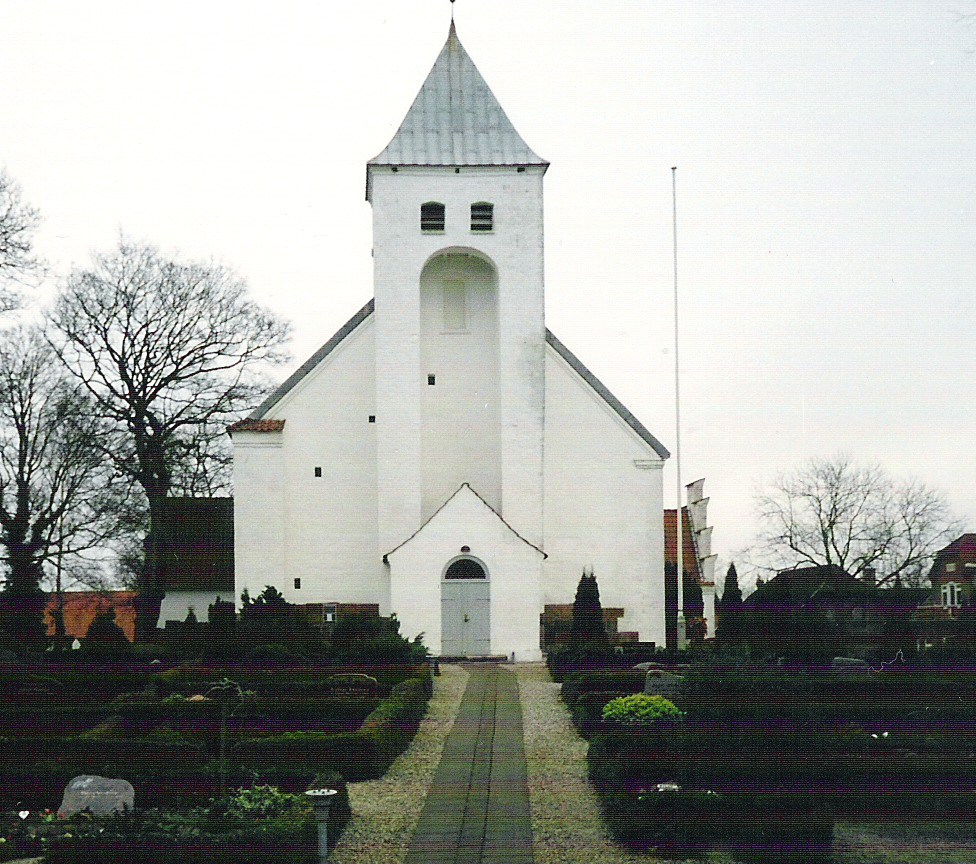
Tirstrup Church in Tirstrup, Jutland, Denmark

The stilt tower (Danish: styltetårn) is a special type of Medieval church tower, concentrated in Djursland peninsula and neighbouring regions of Danish Jutland.

In this type, only the upper storey with the bells has four walls. The lower parts of such a tower are formed by one or three high arches. With one arch, the lower part of the tower, which is connected to the western gable of the nave, is only open to the west. With three arches, the lower part is a high open hall.

Very few stilt towers were built after the Gothic age, if 20th century constructions with a box for the bells on high pillars are kept out of regard. Very few stilt towers were built in the Middle Ages in distant regions, where the term is unknown.

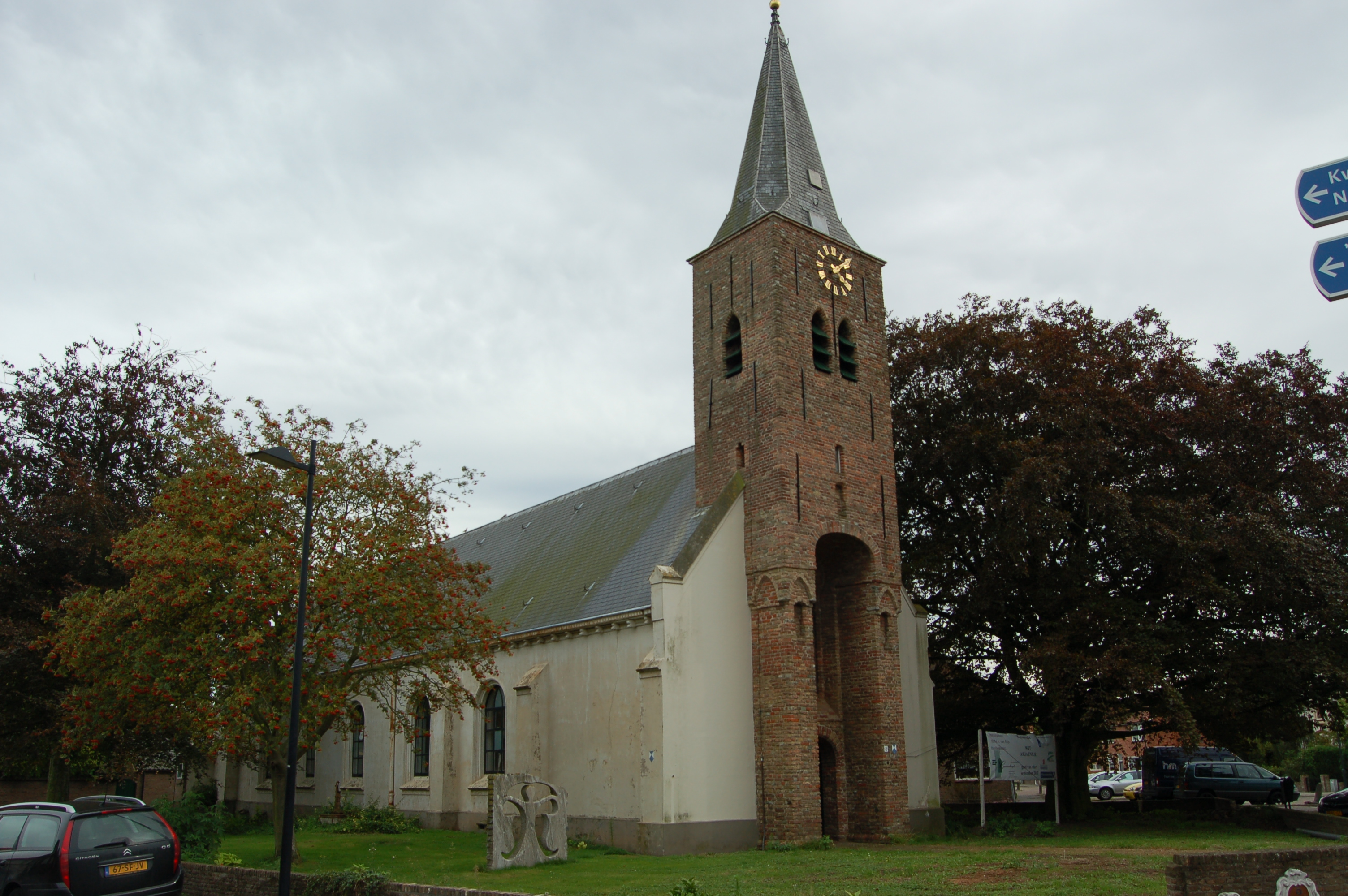
Similar construction in Ovezande, Zuid-Beveland, Zeeland, Netherlands

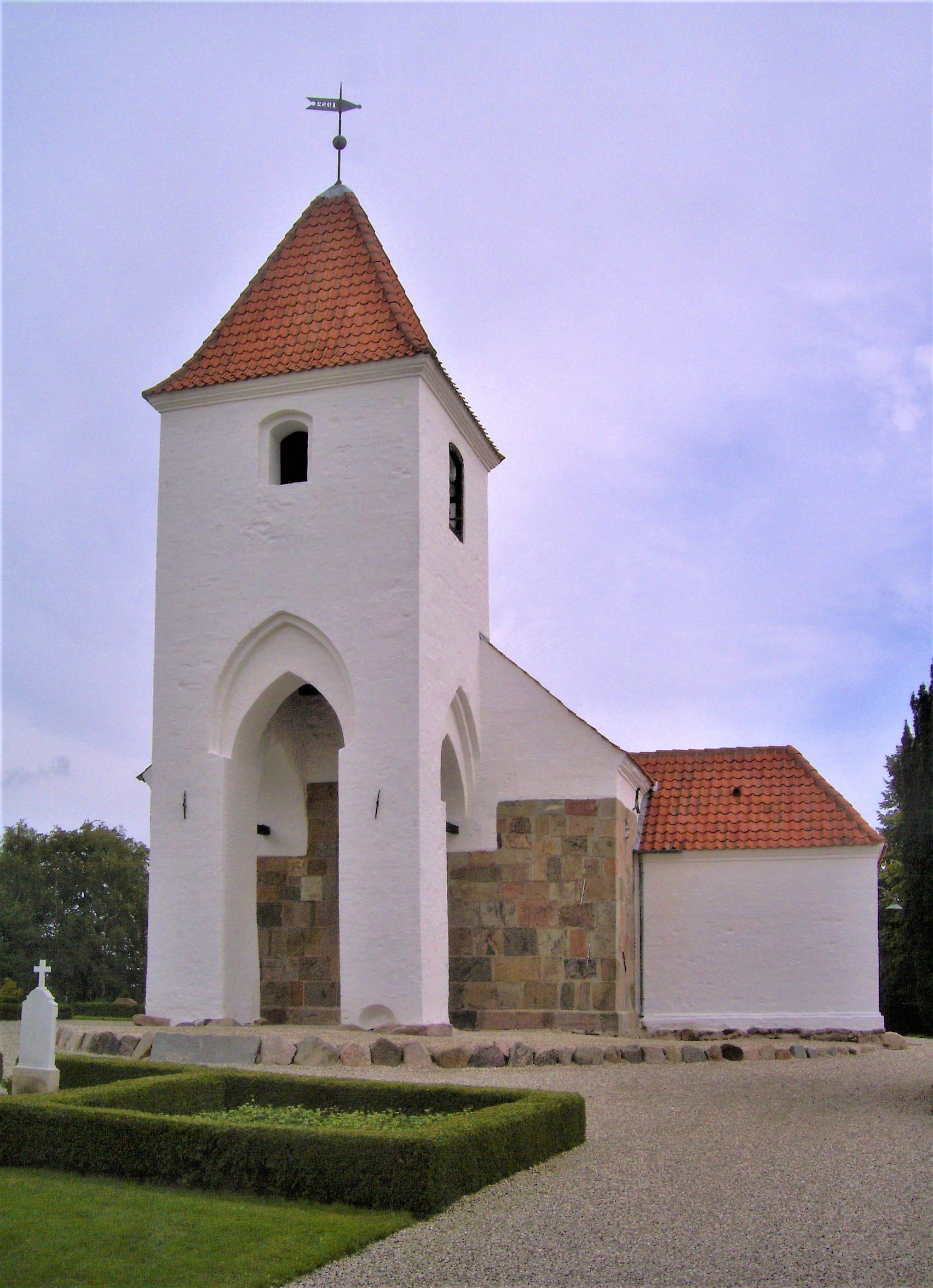
Stilt tower with three arches of Voer Kirke, Northern Djursland, Denmark

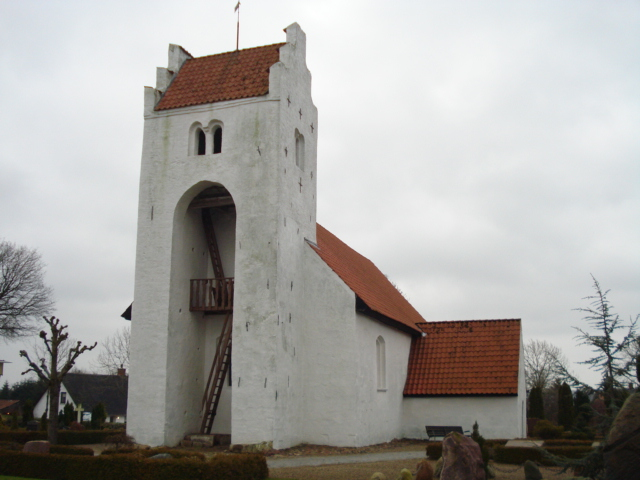
Stilt tower with one open arch of Torrild Kirke, Odder, Denmark
