= Riba de Saelices =

Riba de Saelices, Spain
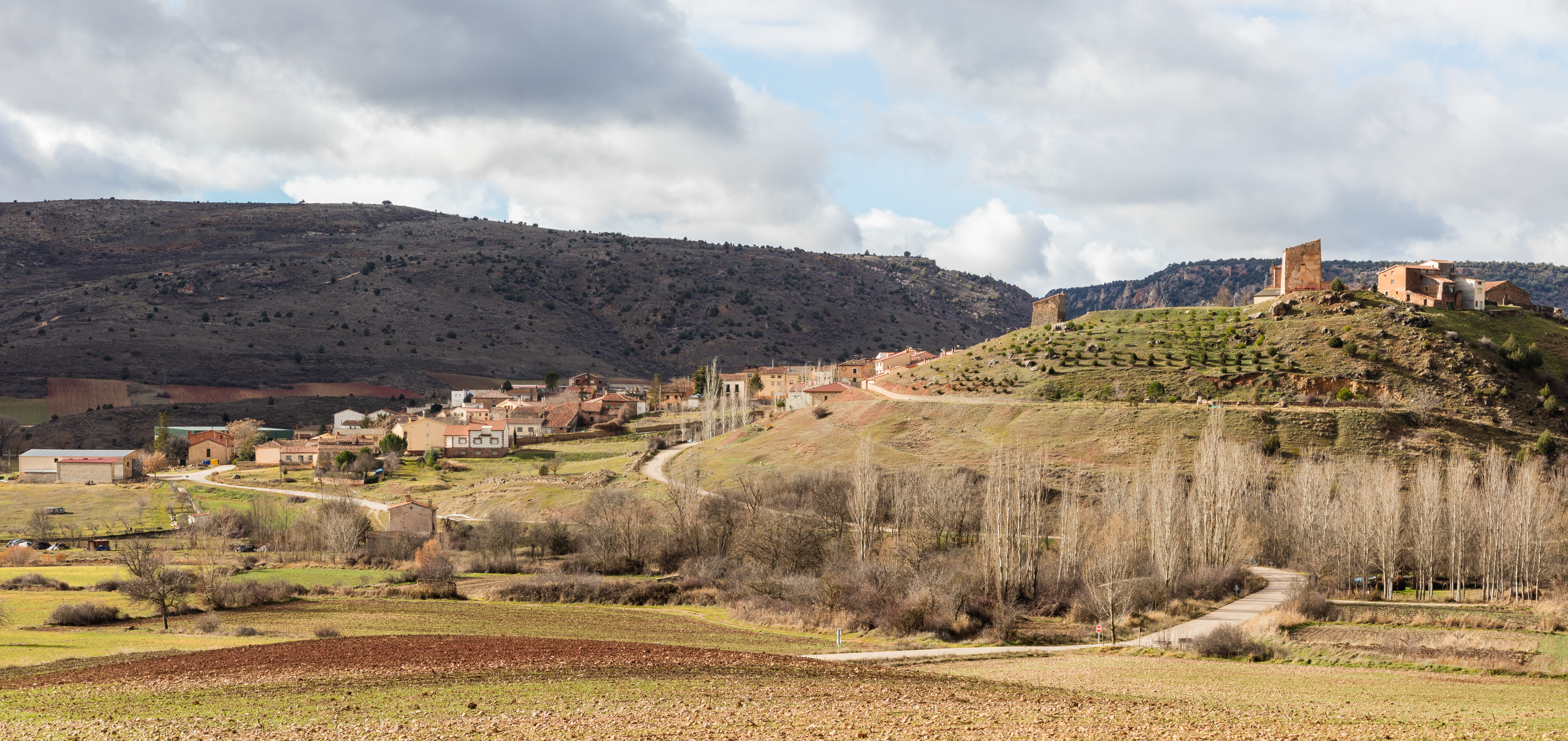

- Coat of arms

- Location within Province of Guadalajara Location within Castilla-La Mancha Location within Spain
- Coordinates: 40°54′44″N 2°17′44″W
- Country: Spain
- Autonomous community: Castile-La Mancha
- Province: Guadalajara
- Municipality: Riba de Saelices

Area
  - Total: 66.68 km^{2} (25.75 sq mi)
- Elevation: 999 m (3,278 ft)

Population (2025-01-01)
  - Total: 113
  - Density: 1.69/km^{2} (4.39/sq mi)
- Time zone: UTC+1 (CET)
  - Summer (DST): UTC+2 (CEST)

Riba de Saelices (Spanish pronunciation: [ˈriβa ðe saeˈliθes]) is a municipality located in the province of Guadalajara, Castile-La Mancha, Spain. According to the 2004 census (INE), the municipality had a population of 168 inhabitants.
