= Olmeda de Cobeta =

Olmeda de Cobeta, Spain
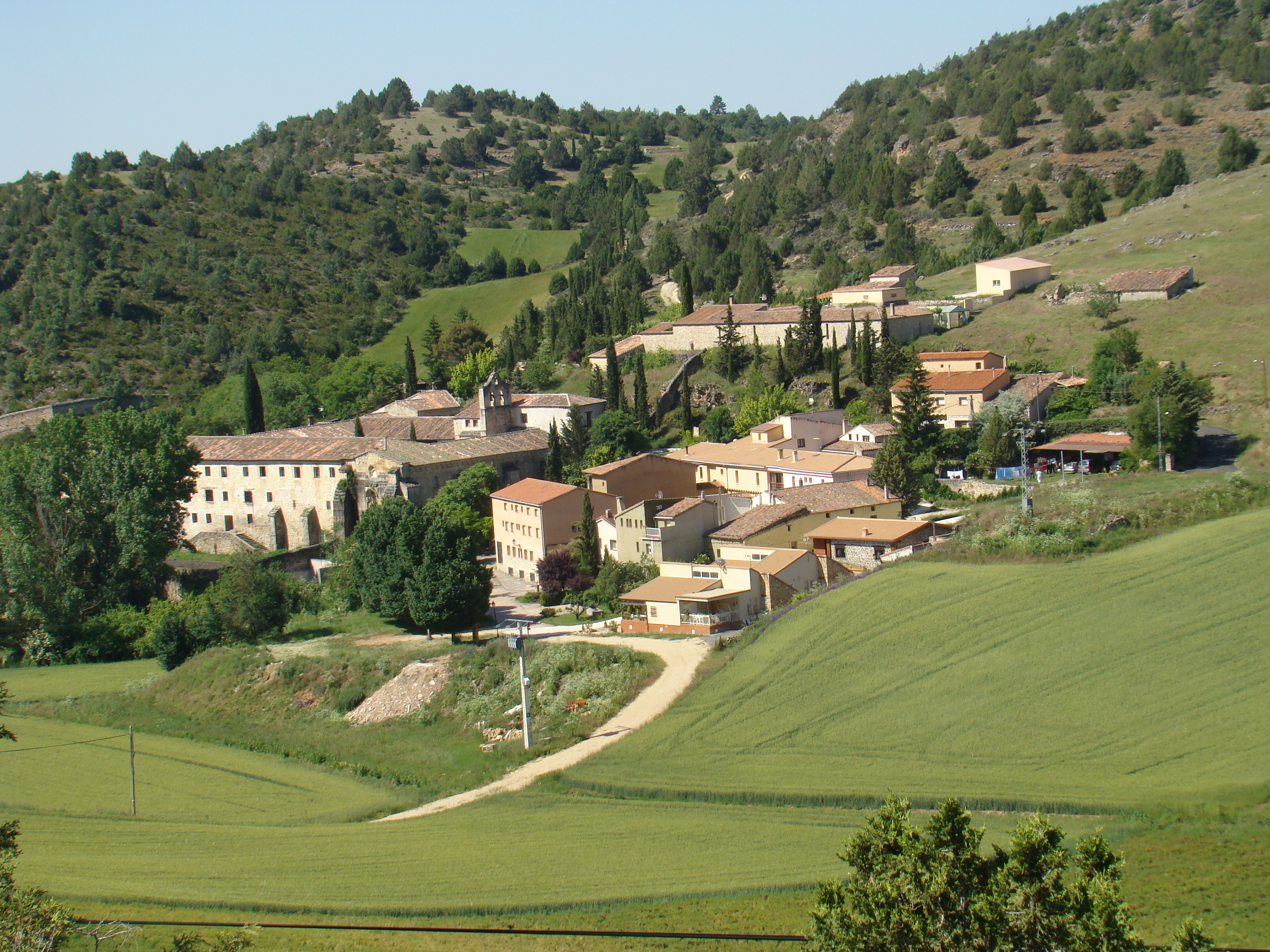

- Flag Coat of arms

- Location within Province of Guadalajara Location within Castilla-La Mancha Location within Spain
- Country: Spain
- Autonomous community: Castile-La Mancha
- Province: Guadalajara
- Municipality: Olmeda de Cobeta

Area
  - Total: 39.62 km^{2} (15.30 sq mi)
- Elevation: 1,147 m (3,763 ft)

Population (2025-01-01)
  - Total: 56
  - Density: 1.4/km^{2} (3.7/sq mi)
- Time zone: UTC+1 (CET)
  - Summer (DST): UTC+2 (CEST)

Olmeda de Cobeta is a municipality located in the province of Guadalajara, Castile-La Mancha, Spain. According to the 2004 census (INE), the municipality had a population of 112 inhabitants.

== Population ==
Year	Residents
1981	100
1991	91
2001	75
2011	80
2021	63
2024	57
