= Talavera de la Reina =

- Municipality
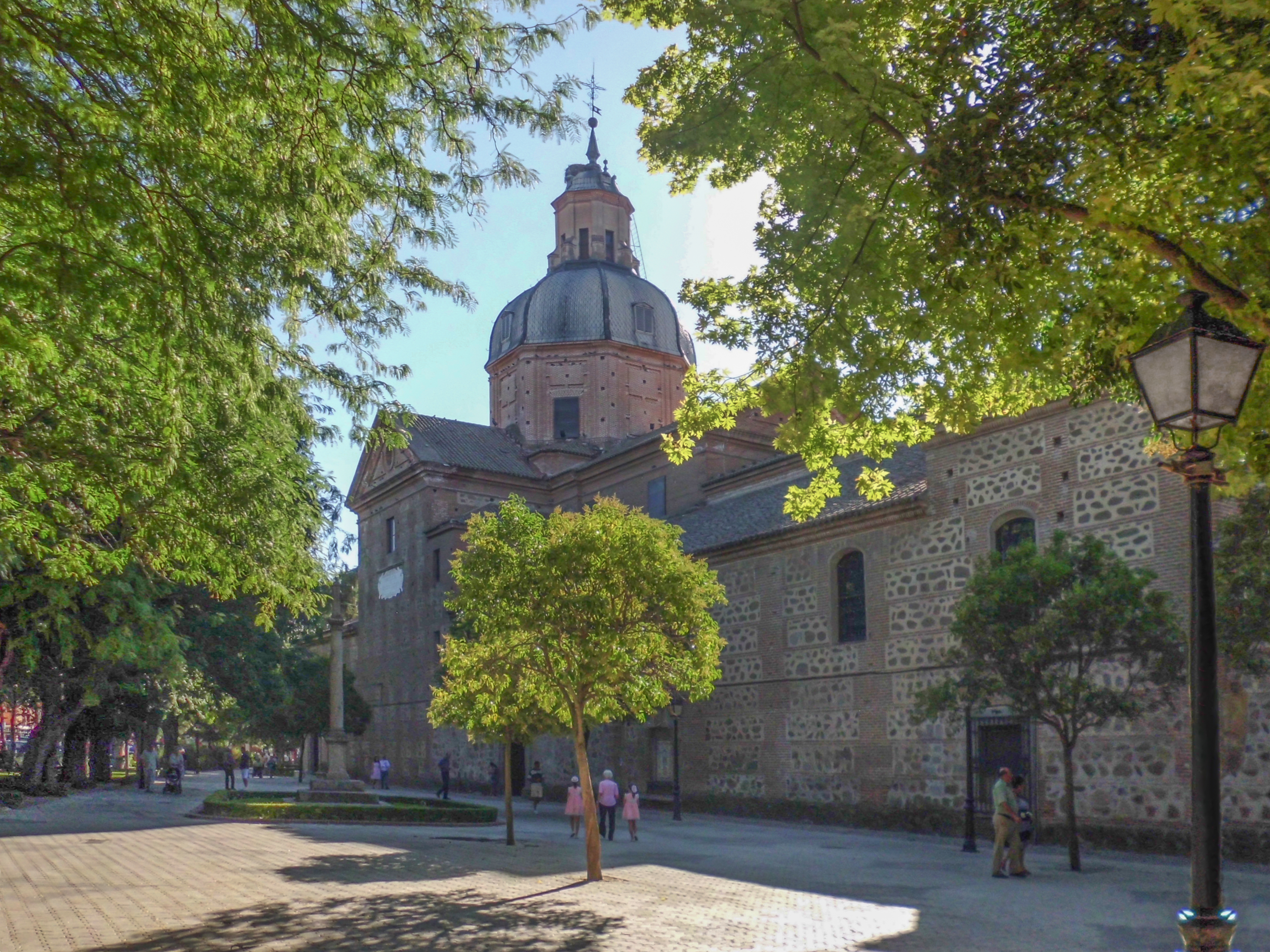
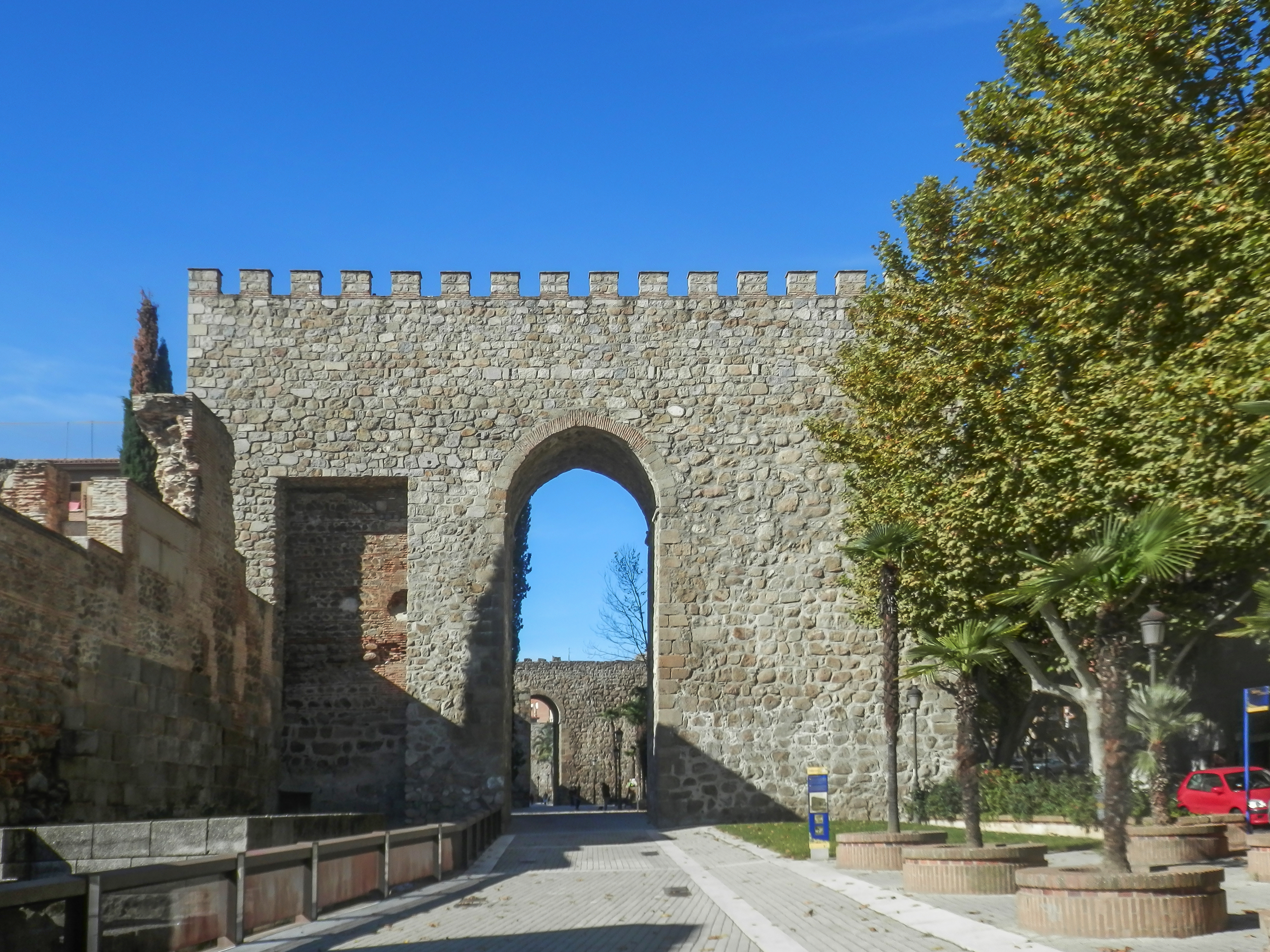
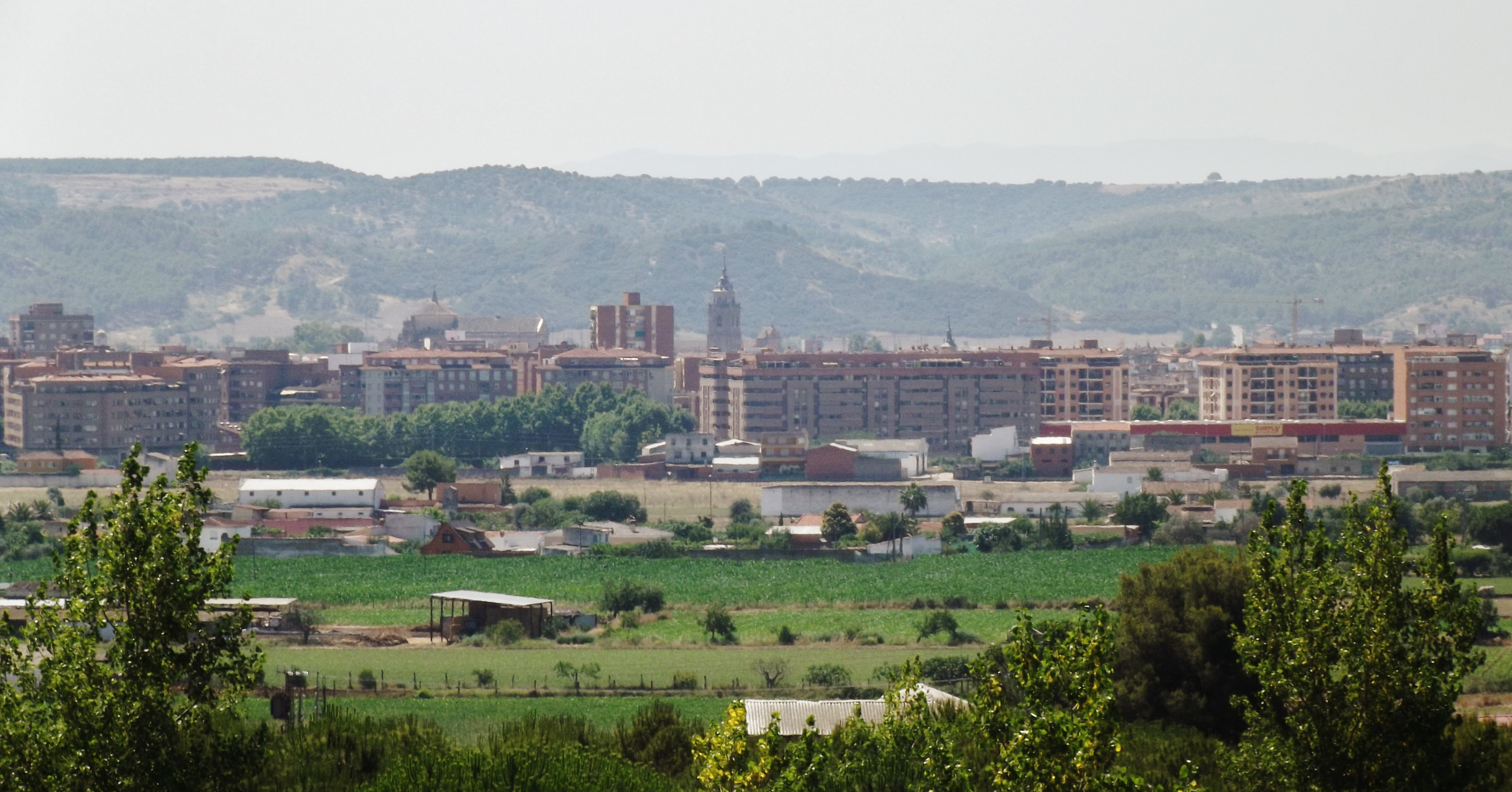
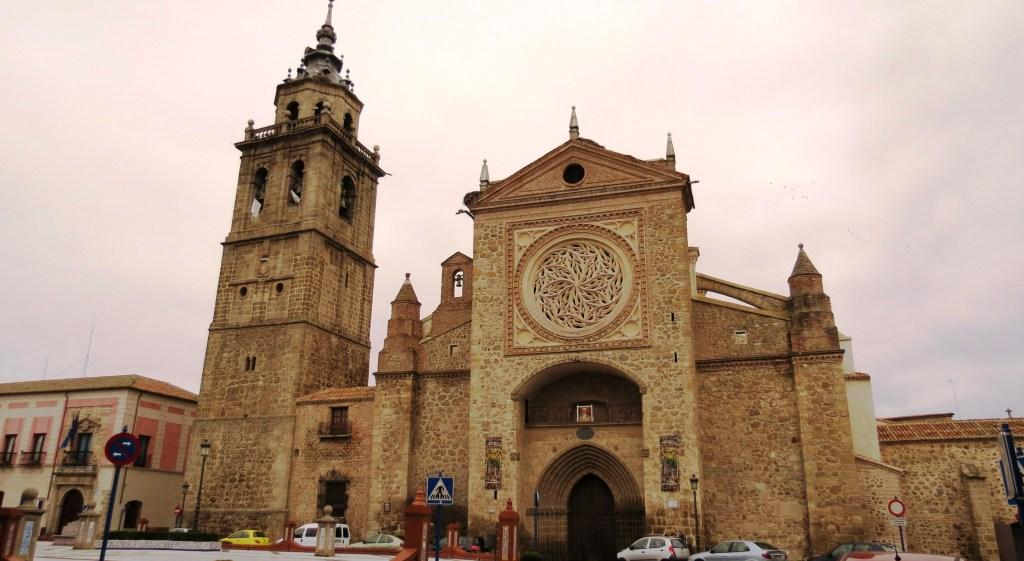
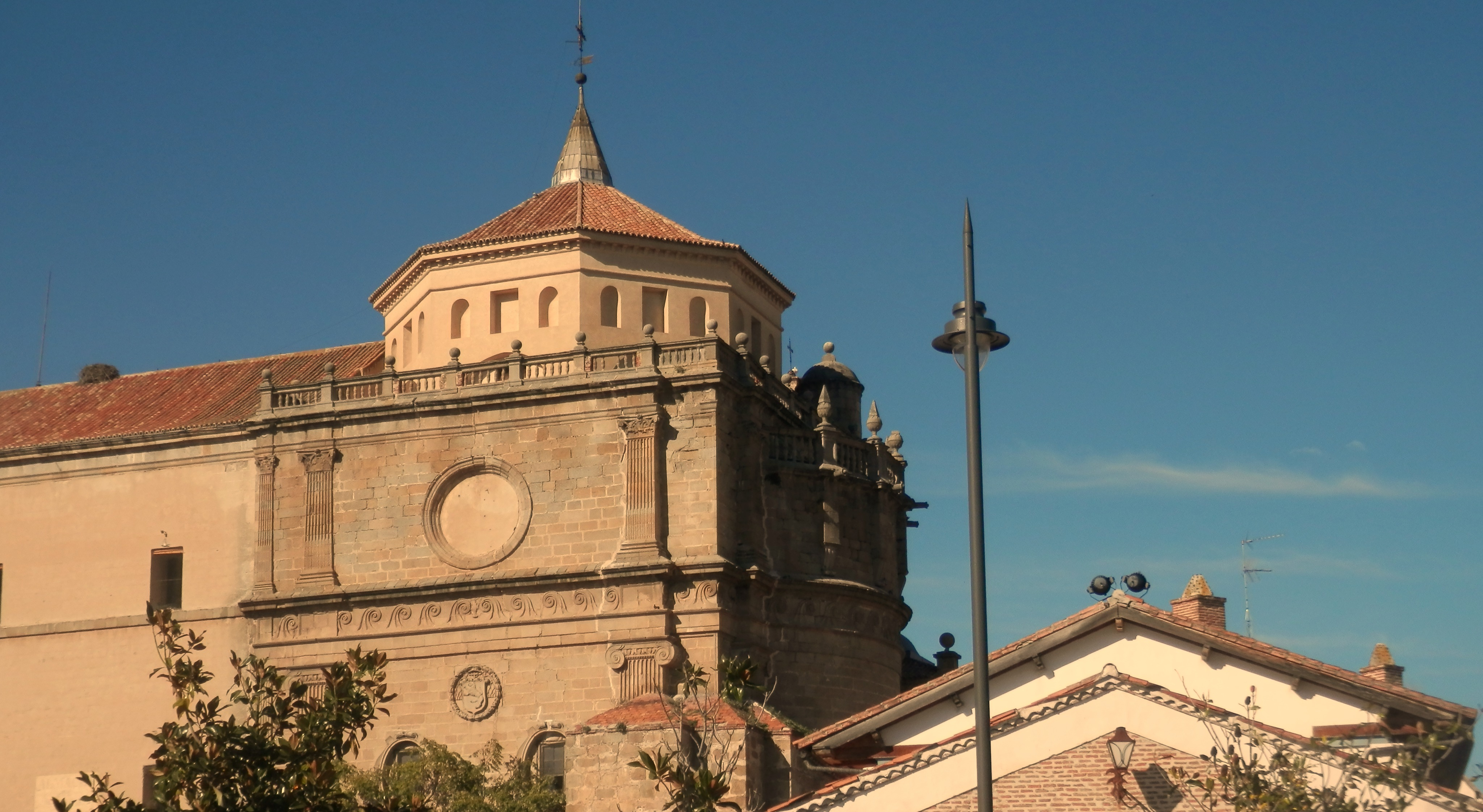
- Clockwise from top: Basilica of Nuestra Señora del Prado, albarrana tower, general view from the North, San Prudencio, Church of Santa María la Mayor

- Flag Coat of arms
- Interactive map of Talavera de la Reina
- Location within Castilla–La Mancha Location within Spain
- Coordinates: 39°57′30″N 4°49′58″W
- Country: Spain
- Autonomous community: Castilla–La Mancha
- Province: Toledo

Government
  - Type: Ayuntamiento
  - Body: Ayuntamiento de Talavera de la Reina
  - Mayor: José Julián Gregorio (PP)

Area
  - Total: 185.83 km^{2} (71.75 sq mi)
- Elevation: 373 m (1,224 ft)

Population (2025-01-01)
  - Total: 83,803
  - Density: 450.97/km^{2} (1,168.0/sq mi)
- Demonym: Talaveranos
- Time zone: UTC+1 (CET)
  - Summer (DST): UTC+2 (CEST)
- Postal code: 45600
- Website: www.talavera.org

Talavera de la Reina (Spanish pronunciation: [talaˈβeɾa ðe la ˈrejna]) is a city and municipality of Spain, part of the autonomous community of Castile–La Mancha. Its population of 83,303 makes it the second most populated municipality of the province of Toledo and the fourth largest in the region.

Although the city straddles both banks of the Tagus, a few kilometres downstream from the junction of the former with the Alberche, most of the urbanisation concentrates on the right (northern) bank. There are two islands in the centre of the city called Isla Grande and Chamelo Island. Three bridges cross the Tagus in Talavera.

While there are pre-Roman archaeological materials in the surroundings associated to the Vettones and the culture of verracos, the urban settlement is dated after Roman subjugation, with the development of a city identified with Caesarobriga by the gathering of indigenous peoples removed from their hilltop settlements (castros).

The city is well known for its pottery craft. The Talavera de la Reina pottery was declared intangible cultural heritage by UNESCO in 2019.

== Toponymy ==
There are remnants of prehistoric cultures in the area. The village was founded by the Celts as a ford of the Tagus. The first mention of the city (with the name Aebura) occurs in Livy's description of a battle between the Romans and the Carpetanoi, a Celtiberian tribe.

After the Roman conquest of Hispania, it was known as Caesarobriga, one of many Celtic toponyms preserved in Roman Hispania, with a name connoting "fortified" that was extended to many non-fortified towns: "Caesarburg". Caesarobriga served as an important centre for agriculture and ceramics in the 3rd and 4th centuries BCE. During the Visigothic period, Talavera reverted to a variant of its Celtiberian name: Elbora or Ebora.

Its modern name is derived from Talabayra, the Muslim rendering of this Visigothic name. The city was conquered by Muslim forces in 713 and conquered by Christian forces under Alfonso VI of Castile in 1083.

== History ==
=== Foundation ===
Talavera de la Reina was founded at the confluence of the rivers Alberche and Tagus. This area of great ecological wealth was the settlement of Celtic people who built the most ancient ruins of the area.

=== Roman Empire and Visigothic Age ===
During the time of the Roman Empire, the name of the city was Caesarobriga. In 182 BCE, Quintus Fulvius Flaccus conquered the city, establishing it as part of the Roman province of Lusitania as a city that would pay a stipend, and as the capital of an extended area included in the legal convent of the city of Emerita Augusta. The leader Viriato, in his war against the Romans, lived in this province between 145 and 139 BCE.

In this period, Talavera de la Reina was a rich city with cattle markets and commercial exchange. Christianity came early to the city, and with the fall of the Western Roman Empire, the Visigoths established themselves in the city. Talavera was known then as Aküis or Aibura.

In the year 602, King Liuva II made a present to the city: the sculpture of the Virgin Mary, who was from then to the present day the symbol of the Christians in Talavera de la Reina, and the substitute for the goddess Ceres. In honour of the goddess Ceres, Talaverian Romans celebrated the spring festival called Mondas, which is still celebrated for the Virgin Mary.

=== Middle ages ===
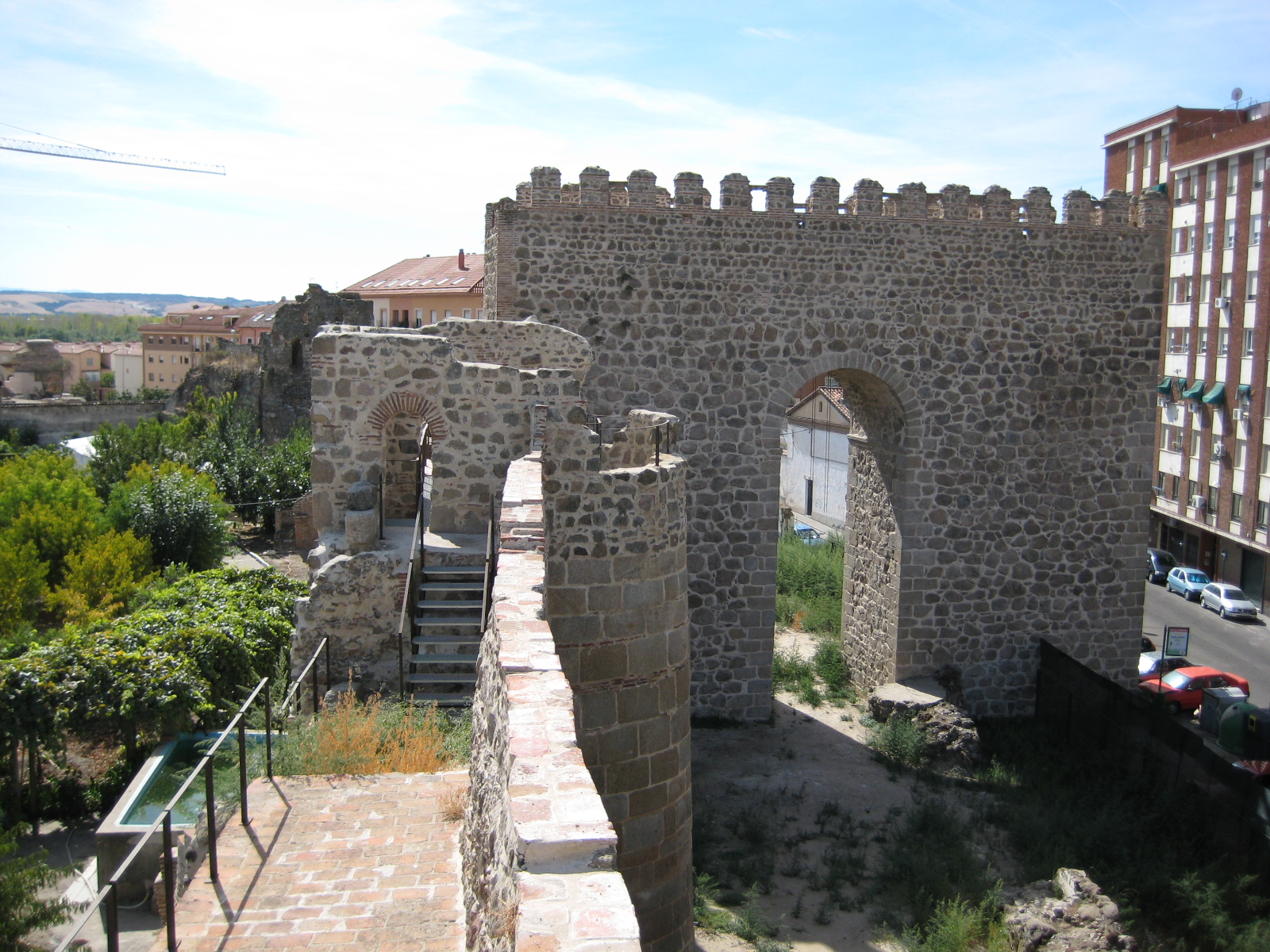
An albarrana tower of the ancient city walls

The Muslims conquered Talavera in 712. They built new walls and a castle in Talavera. They also brought the use of fountains, water mills and new products brought from Africa and Asia. The fertile soil produced quality vegetables, fruits and grass for animal feed. The markets gained new strength, and the population, a mixture of Christians, Muslims and Jews, lived in harmony for some centuries. Medina Al Talavayra took part in different wars between the kingdoms of Spain, becoming allied with Córdoba and Badajoz. Alfonso VI of León-Castile seized the city in 1083. The city was retaken temporarily by Muslims in 1109.

12th-century geographer Al-Idrisi reflects on Talavera describing it as a "large town by the riverside of the Tagus", "with a great number of watermills" and "surrounded of fertile fields".

The countryside of Talavera endured Almohad algaras in the early 1170s. Violence resumed after a truce in 1177, as answer to the simultaneous Castilian siege on Cuenca. In 1182, an Almohad army set up a camp near Talavera. Following the Almohad victory at Alarcos by Abu Yusuf Yaqub in 1195, Almohad forces ravaged the countryside of Talavera by 1197, yet apparently the well-fortified city (at least the citadel) stood still. Following the battle of Las Navas in 1212, the territory north of the Montes de Toledo became secure from Muslim incursions for good. Talaveran militias reportedly launched unsuccessful raids in Southern Iberia for the remaining of the 13th century.

The repopulation of the territory after the Christian conquest was led by Castilians, Franks and Mozarabs. Also a number of Moors from the south would increase the preexisting Muslim population of Talavera. Until 1290, Castilians and Mozarabs lived under the aegis of different law regimes. By the mid 13th century, Talavera and Plasencia sealed the creation of a brotherhood seeking to counter the territorial push southwards of the powerful concejo of Ávila.

Formerly a realengo town, sometimes property of queens, such as Maria of Portugal, Talavera was transferred by Henry II of Castile on 25 June 1369 to Gómez Manrique (the transfer was confirmed in the 1371 Cortes of Toro), the Archbishop of Toledo, as payment for the latter's support in the Castilian Civil War, and, since then, the town became attached to the Archbishops of Toledo.

The change from the concejo abierto towards a regimiento system of municipal government in Talavera should have happened by the second half of the 14th century. Unlike other locations the chief municipal public offices (regidurías) in Talavera were not subject to transfer from father to son, so the nobiliary elite relied in an alternative strategy to ensure its supremacy, based on a system that allowed them to control the candidates to the regidoría.

King Sancho IV gave the royal privilege to hold two royal markets each year.

=== Early Modern history ===
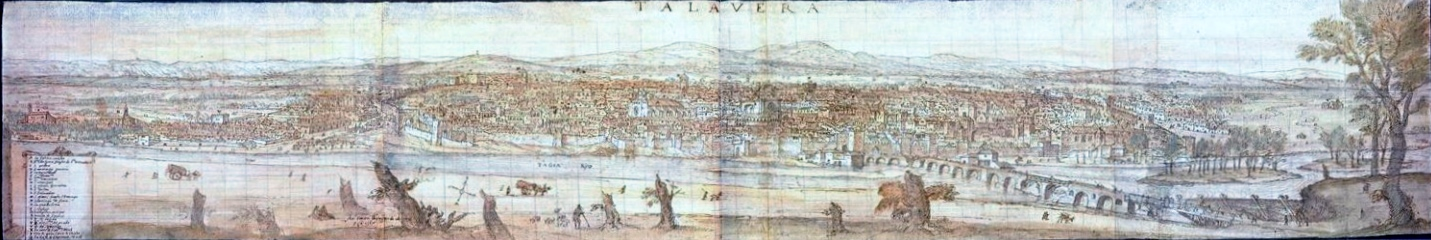
View of Talavera by Anton van den Wyngaerde (c. 1567).

By the late third of the 16th century the city reached a population of 10,000.

Upon the death of King Charles II in November 1700, two powerful nations fought for the Spanish Crown. Talavera supported Philip V's French faction, which was the winner.

In the mid-18th century, by 1748, as part of the economic policies enforced by the Spanish Bourbons, the Royal Factory of Silk, Silver and Gold Fabric, was opened in the city, during the reign of Ferdinand VI.

The number of hidalgos reduced during the 18th century. The clergy retained an important socioeconomic importance. Towards the end of the century, a number of religious French emigrees would arrive to Talavera after the triumph of the Revolution. During the second half of the century, the bulk of the working population comprised the non-specialised workers and textile workers, ceramics workers (with a diminishing importance compared to previous centuries) and those dedicated to services, followed by the food industry, leather and the shoemaking sector.

=== 19th and 20th centuries ===
The Peninsular War had great consequences for Talavera. On 27 and 28 July 1809 the Battle of Talavera took place between the Anglo-Spanish army and the French. The Duke of Wellington's army expelled the French from the city.

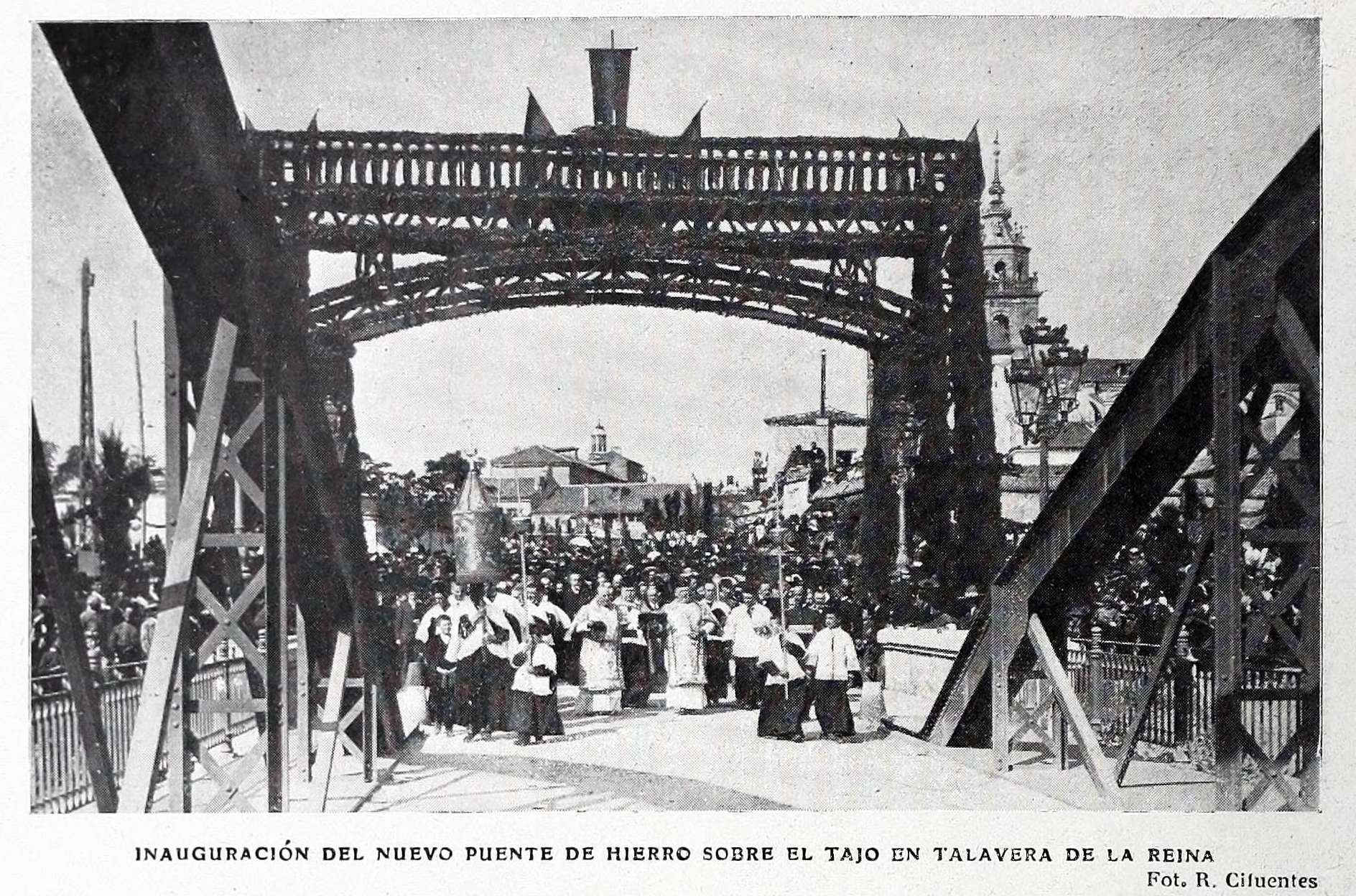
Opening of the Iron Bridge in October 1908

The manufacturing complex of the Royal Silk Factory closed towards 1851.

Talavera was granted the title of city (ciudad) in 1876.

Following the September 1923 coup d'etat and the ensuing installment of the dictatorship of Primo de Rivera, the local branch of the Patriotic Union (UP) formed in the city in March 1924 and the paramilitary Somatén in December 1924, during an event scheduled by Duchess of Talavera. A number of public events and demonstrations took place as part of the legitimization of the regime. The good connections of Mayor Justiniano López Brea with provincial and national officeholders fostered several projects of public works in the later part of the dictatorial period.

The railroad brought new opportunities for improvement. Talavera changed its name to Talavera del Tajo. The city had a population of 16,654 in 1936. The city had a population of 18,631 in 1940.

During the Francoist dictatorship the Instituto Nacional de Colonización promoted a large irrigated zone in the surroundings of Talavera, following which two new settlements were created, called Talavera la Nueva and Alberche del Caudillo, the latter located in the neighboring Calera y Chozas municipality. During the 1960s a baby boom caused an increase in the population, added to by the immigrants coming from the nearby villages and poor areas of Extremadura.

=== Recent developments ===
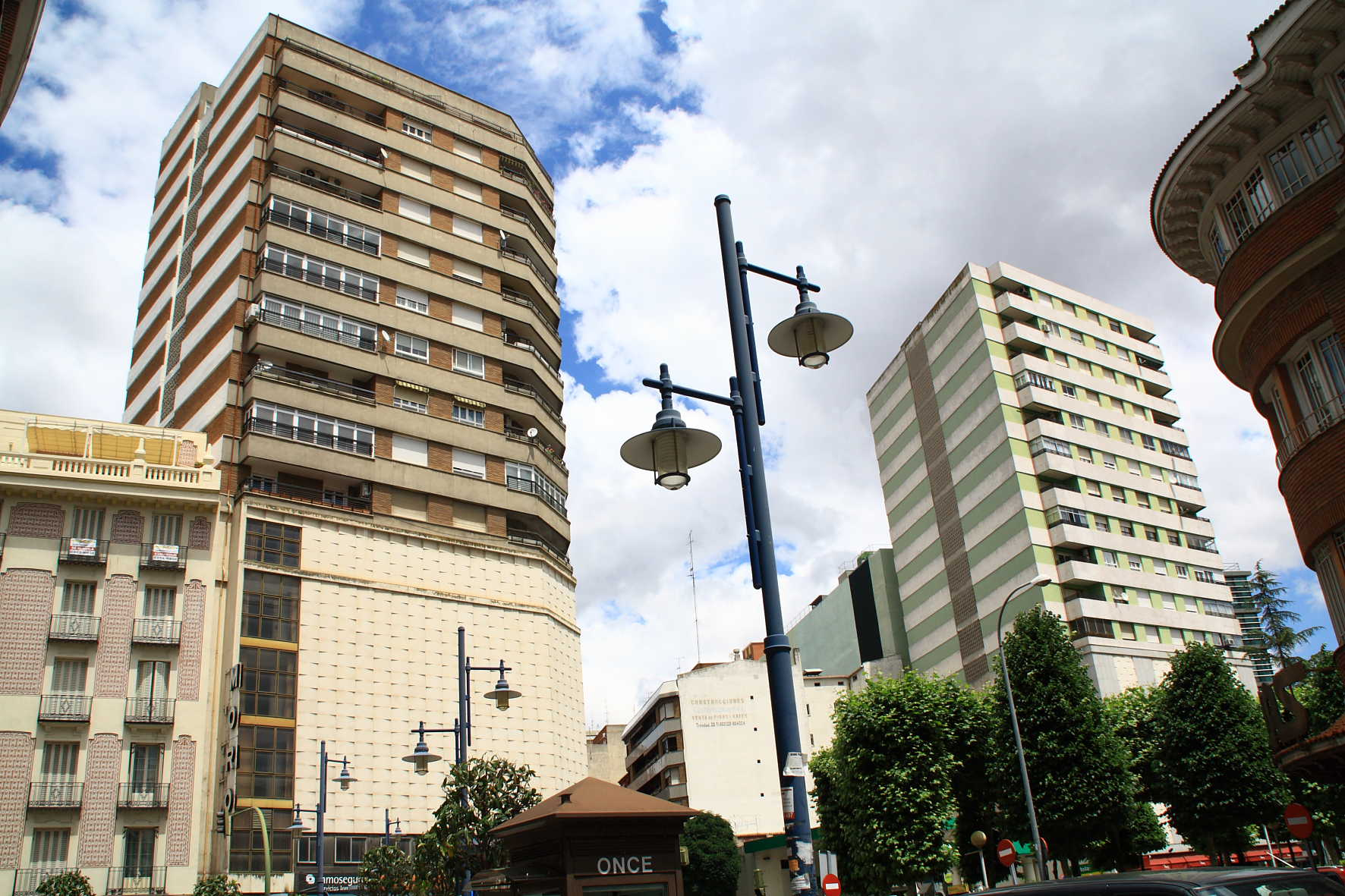
View of the city centre

After Franco died in 1975, Talavera's first democratic mayor tried to create the province of Talavera, but the idea was not successful. The succeeding mayor, Pablo Tello of the Socialist Party, made significant contributions, including the creation of Alameda Park.

In 1989, a sense of marginalization took hold of the city, prompting a group called "Nosotros Talavera" (We Talavera) to advocate for the establishment of a university campus and other initiatives to benefit the city. A Centre for University Studies was opened in the city in 1994. It was fully integrated as a campus of the University of Castile-La Mancha (UCLM) four years later, in 1998.

== Main sights ==
Rising over 192 metres, the Puente de Castilla-La Mancha, built in the outskirts of the city, was the highest bridge in Spain at the time of its completion. Given the enormous cost and limited use, it is considered a wasteful investment. Spanning over 318 m over the main channel of the Tagus, the cable-stayed bridge it is nonetheless one of the city's most distinctive features.

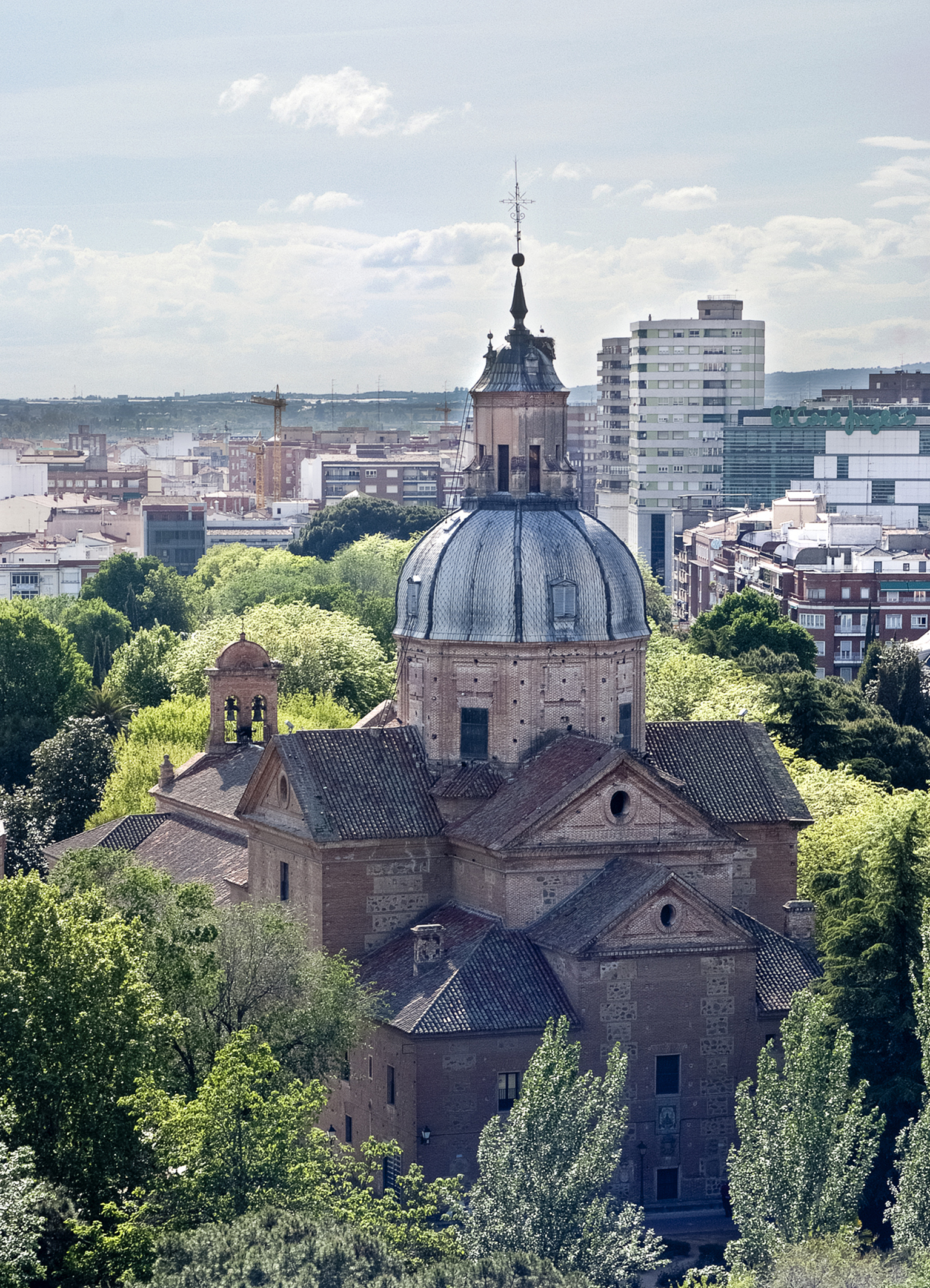
Basilica of Nuestra Señora del Prado

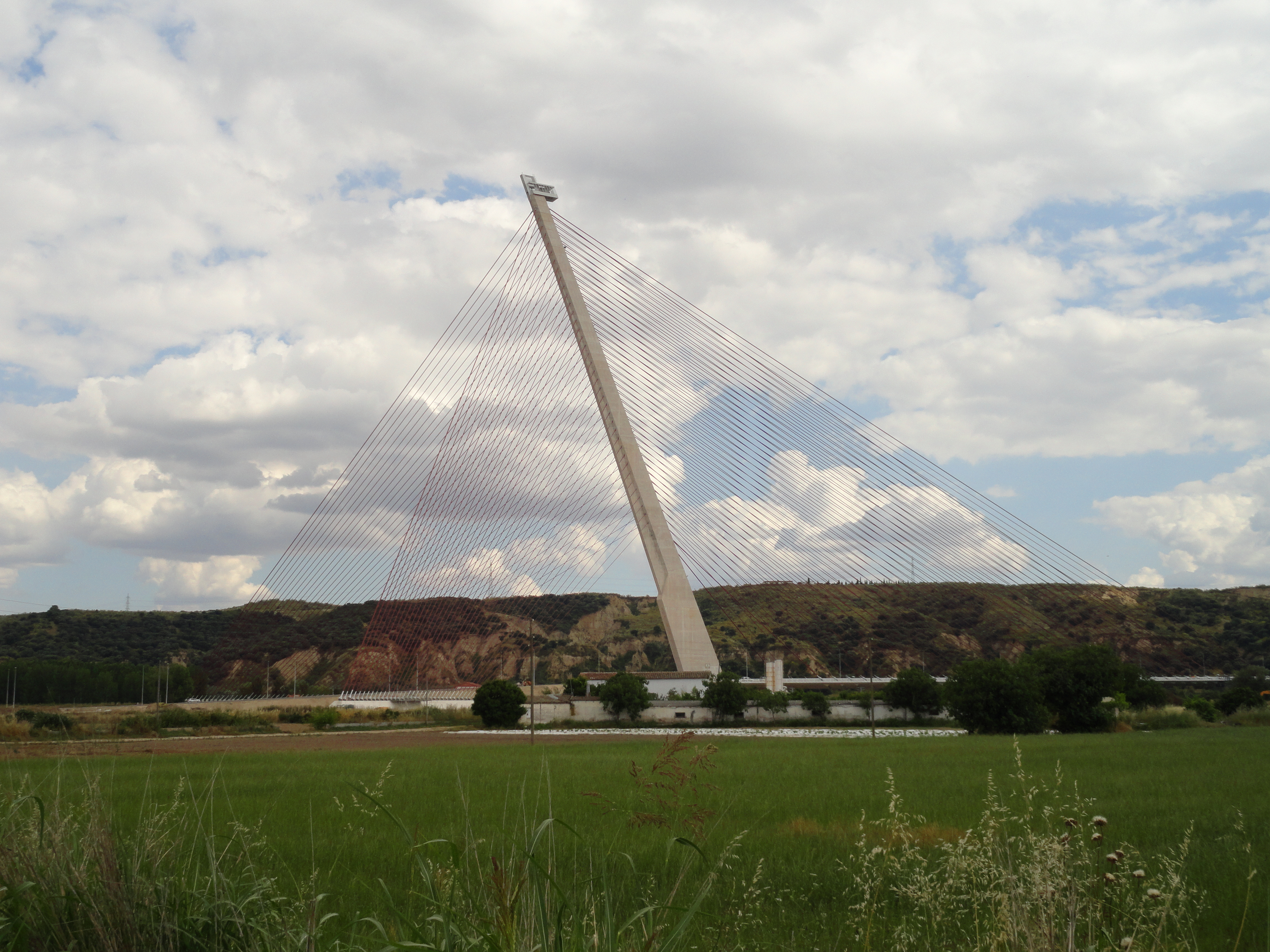
Bridge of Castilla–La Mancha

== Geography ==
=== Climate ===
Climate data for Talavera de la Reina (1981–2010)
| Month | Jan | Feb | Mar | Apr | May | Jun | Jul | Aug | Sep | Oct | Nov | Dec | Year |
|---|---|---|---|---|---|---|---|---|---|---|---|---|---|
| Mean daily maximum °C (°F) | 11.5 (52.7) | 13.8 (56.8) | 18.1 (64.6) | 20.0 (68.0) | 24.3 (75.7) | 30.7 (87.3) | 34.7 (94.5) | 34.0 (93.2) | 29.3 (84.7) | 22.0 (71.6) | 15.8 (60.4) | 12.0 (53.6) | 22.2 (71.9) |
| Mean daily minimum °C (°F) | 1.2 (34.2) | 2.4 (36.3) | 4.7 (40.5) | 6.5 (43.7) | 10.0 (50.0) | 14.6 (58.3) | 17.1 (62.8) | 16.8 (62.2) | 13.9 (57.0) | 9.6 (49.3) | 5.1 (41.2) | 2.4 (36.3) | 8.7 (47.7) |
| Average rainfall mm (inches) | 46.9 (1.85) | 41.5 (1.63) | 25.9 (1.02) | 52.4 (2.06) | 42.6 (1.68) | 17.6 (0.69) | 3.8 (0.15) | 6.6 (0.26) | 23.3 (0.92) | 70.2 (2.76) | 64.2 (2.53) | 72.2 (2.84) | 467.2 (18.39) |
| Average rainy days (≥ 1 mm) | 9.1 | 7.5 | 5.6 | 8.5 | 7.3 | 3.8 | 1.4 | 1.5 | 4.1 | 8.0 | 9.3 | 10.7 | 76.8 |
Source: World Meteorological Organization

== Culture ==
=== Pottery ===
The city is internationally known for its ceramics, which Philip II of Spain used as tiled revetments in many of his works, such as the monastery of El Escorial. The nickname of Talavera de la Reina is 'The City of Pottery' (La Ciudad de la Cerámica, in Spanish). Mexico's famous Talavera pottery was named after the city.

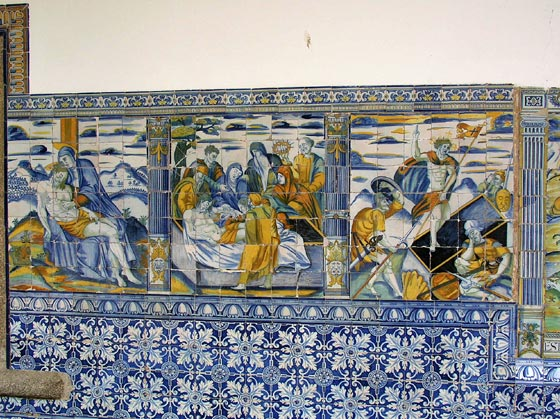
An example of the Talavera pottery

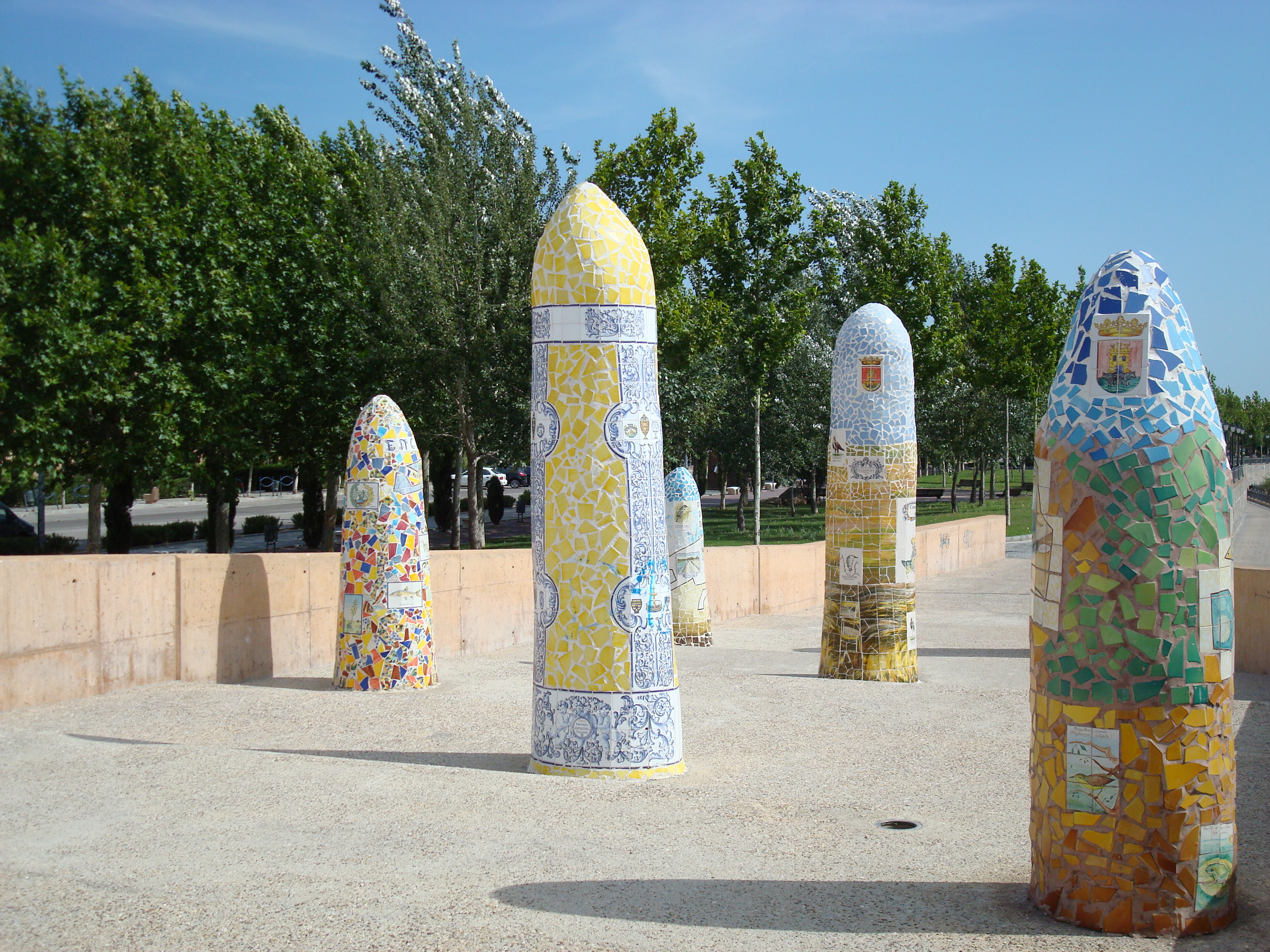
Ornamental menhirs

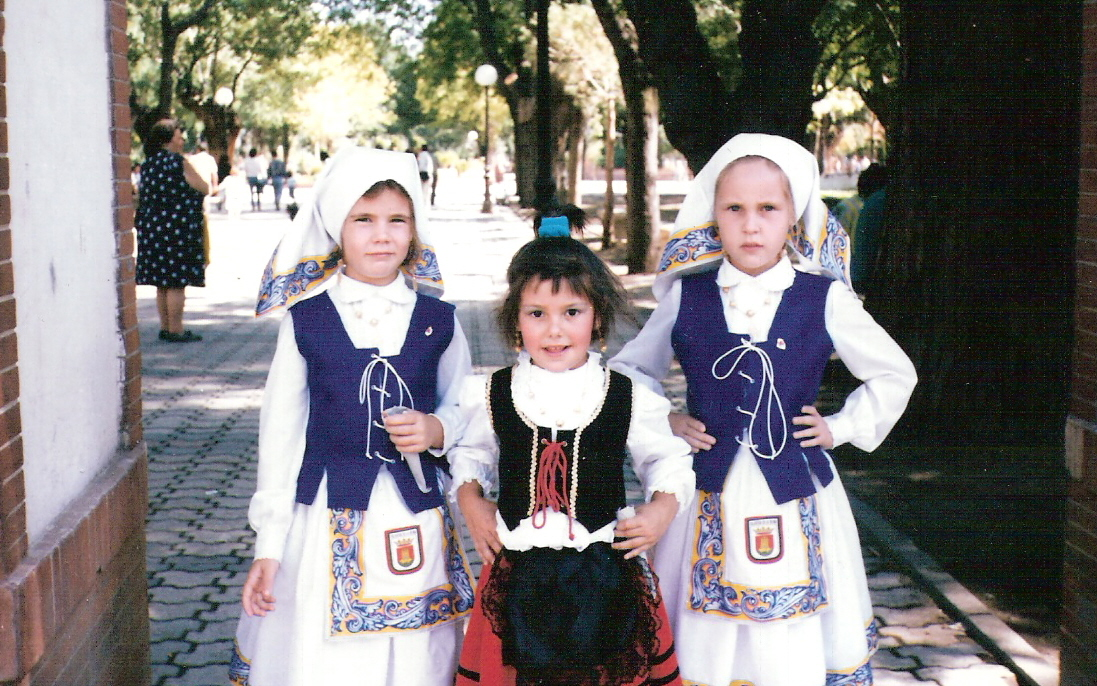
Talaveran girls dressed with folk costumes

== Transportation ==
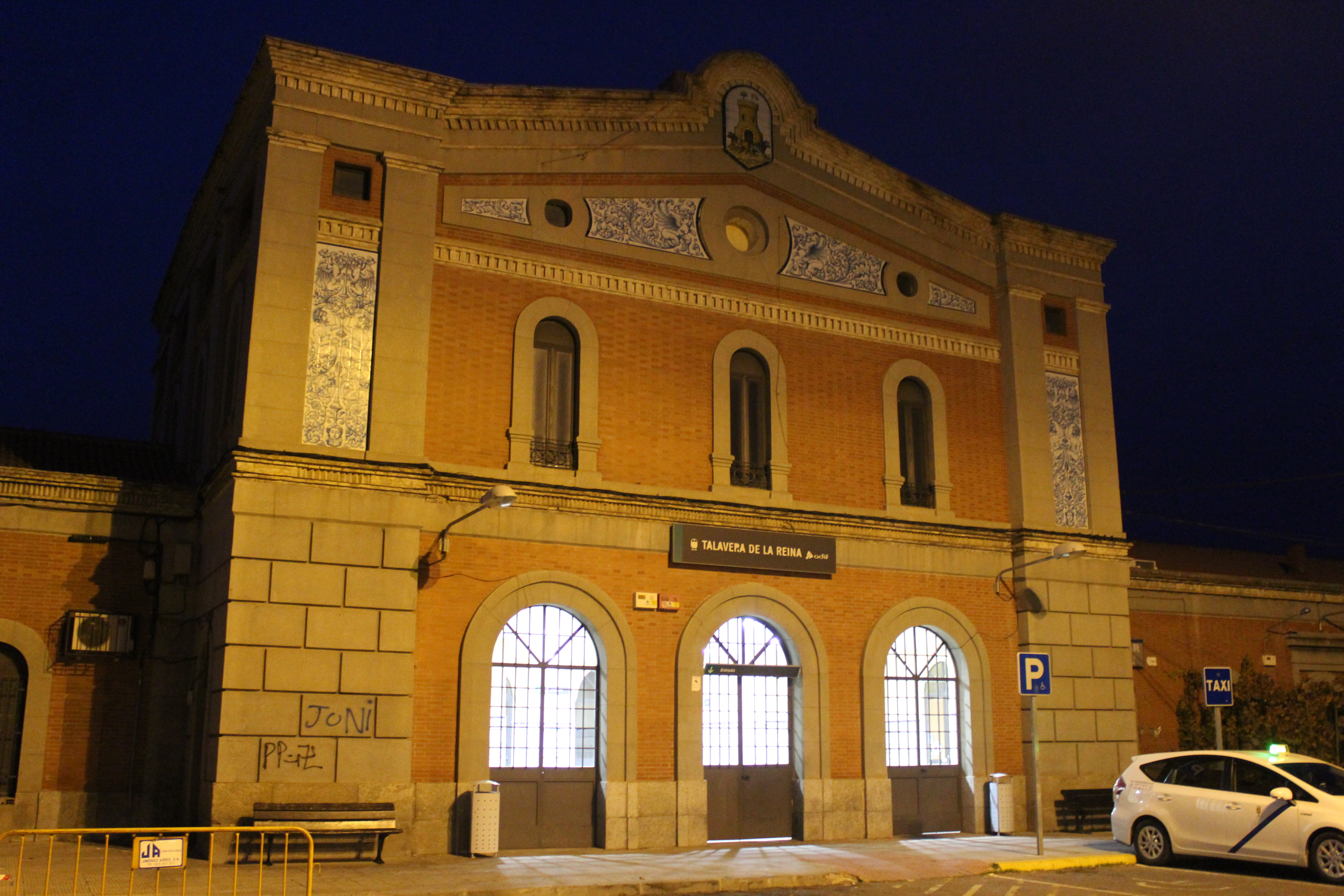
Façade of the Talavera de la Reina railway station

The city is located at the intersection of Autovía A-5 (part of European route E90) and N-502. Located on the route between Madrid and Badajoz, it has a railway station. Talavera de la Reina's city bus system is Eborabus.

== International relations ==
Twin cities—Sister towns

Talavera de la Reina is twinned with:

- Bron, France.
- Faenza, Italy.
- Santiago del Estero, Argentina
- Puebla, Mexico
- Plasencia, Spain
- Daira of Guelta, Western Sahara
- Talavera de la Reyna, Peru

Other partnerships

- Radom, Poland, since 2006

== See also ==
- El Casar de Talavera

== Bibliography ==
- Atenza Fernández, Juan; Mirón González, Rubén; Díaz Díaz, Benito (2019). "Asistencia sanitaria y salud pública en Talavera de la Reina durante la Guerra Civil (1936-1939)". Asclepio. 71 (2): 282. doi:10.3989/asclepio.2019.23. hdl:10017/63309. ISSN 0210-4466.
- Blanco, Miguel Ángel (1997). "Panorámica social de Talavera de la Reina en el siglo XVIII: las clases privilegiadas y la estructura socio-profesional". Cuaderna. 5. Talavera de la Reina: Colectivo Arrabal: 36–46. ISSN 1134-8895.
- Díaz, Benito (1994). "La protesta popular en Talavera: el motín del pan de 1898". Cuaderna: Revista de Estudios Humanísticos de Talavera y su Antigua Tierra (1): 76–90. ISSN 1134-8895.
- García Alonso, Juan Luis (2008). "-Briga Toponyms in the Iberian Peninsula". e-Keltoi. 6 (1).
- García Fitz, Francisco (2001). "Una frontera caliente la guerra en las fronteras castellano-musulmanas (siglos XI-XII)". In Ayala Martínez, Carlos de; Buresi, Pascal; Josserand, Philippe (eds.). Identidad y representación de la frontera en la España medieval, siglos XI-XIV: seminario celebrado en la Casa de Velázquez y la Universidad Autónoma de Madrid, 14-15 de diciembre de 1998. Madrid: Casa de Velázquez. pp. 159–180. ISBN 8495555212.
- Jiménez, Juan Carlos (1996). "Geografía física en los alrededores de Talavera de la Reina. Geomorfología Cuaternaria". Cuaderna. Revistas de Estudios Humanísticos de Talavera y Su Antigua Tierra (3). Colectivo Arrabal. ISSN 1134-8895.
- Lozano Castellanos, Alicia (2015). "Controlando el regimiento. La nobleza de Talavera de la Reina y sus métodos de intervención política en el concejo en la Baja Edad Media". En la España Medieval. 38 (38): 37–55. doi:10.5209/rev_ELEM.2015.v38.49037. ISSN 0214-3038.
- Martínez, Sergio (1996). "Talavera de la Reina en las fuentes medievales" (PDF). Cuaderna. 4. Talavera de la Reina: Colectivo Arrabal: 66–91. ISSN 1134-8895 – via Universidad de Castilla-La Mancha.
- Morales Díaz, David (2016). "Propaganda y nacionalización durante la dictadura de Primo de Rivera en Talavera de la Reina" (PDF). Alcalibe (16). Talavera de la Reina: Centro Asociado a la UNED «Ciudad de la Cerámica». ISSN 1579-9875.
- Moreno Moreno, María Yolanda (2015). Los mudéjares de Talavera de la Reina en la baja edad media (PDF). Universidad Nacional de Educación a Distancia.
- Pacheco Jiménez, César (1999). "La industria del cuero en Talavera de la Reina (siglos XVI-XVII): las Ordenanzas de zapateros y curtidores de 1600" (PDF). Espacio, Tiempo y Forma. Serie IV, Historia Moderna (12). Madrid: Universidad Nacional de Educación a Distancia: 199–221. ISSN 1131-768X.
- Pacheco Jiménez, César (2001). "Símbolos de poder y su expresión en el mundo urbano del siglo XVI: la villa de Talavera y su señor el arzobispo de Toledo". Espacio, Tiempo y Forma. Serie IV, Historia Moderna (14). Madrid: Universidad Nacional de Educación a Distancia: 173–196. doi:10.5944/etfiv.14.2001.3422. ISSN 1131-768X.
- Pacheco Jiménez, César (2014). "Santa María la Mayor de Talavera: de mezquita aljama a iglesia mayor (ss. X-XV)" (PDF). Libro homenaje a Ramón Gonzálvez Ruiz. Toledo: Real Academia de Bellas Artes y Ciencias Históricas de Toledo.
- Peñalver Ramos, Luis Francisco (1996). "El complejo manufacturero de la Real Fábrica de Seda de Talavera de la Reina (1785). Cesión que hace la Corona a los Cinco Gremios Mayores de Madrid". Espacio, Tiempo y Forma. Serie IV, Historia Moderna. 9. Madrid: UNED: 359–389.
- Sánchez de León, Ramón; Bernal Pérez, Cristian; Sánchez de León, Francisco (2012). "Puente atirantado de Talavera de la Reina". Hormigón y Acero. 63 (263): 7–47.
- Sánchez González, Ramón (1992). "Ordenanzas de la Comunidad de villa y tierra de Talavera de la Reina, 1519" (PDF). Anales Toledanos (29): 77–132. ISSN 0538-1983.
- Torres Montealegre, María José; López Vázquez, Luis B. (1998). "Estudio de las murallas de Talavera de la Reina: deterioro y restauración". II Congreso nacional de historia de la construcción (PDF). pp. 475–482. ISBN 84-89977-44-5. Archived from the original (PDF) on 2014-08-29.
