= Chequilla =

- municipality
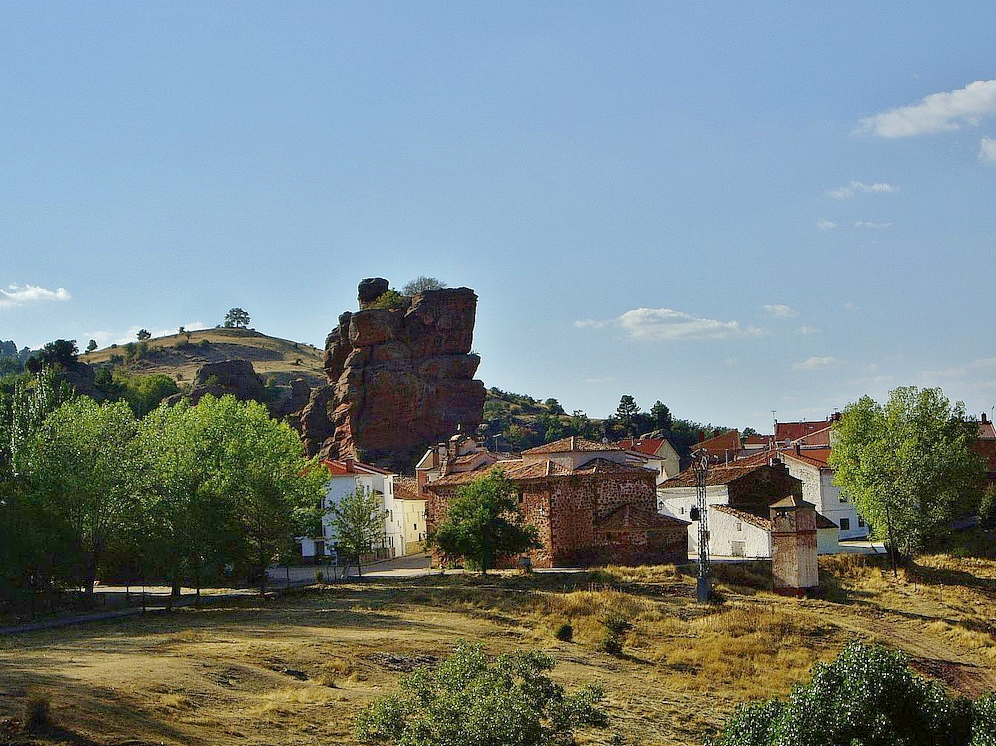

- Location within Province of Guadalajara Location within Castilla-La Mancha Location within Spain
- Coordinates: 40°36′26″N 1°49′36″W
- Country: Spain
- Autonomous community: Castile-La Mancha
- Province: Guadalajara
- Municipality: Chequilla

Government
  - Type: Concejo abierto

Area
  - Total: 15 km^{2} (5.8 sq mi)

Population (2025-01-01)
  - Total: 13
  - Density: 0.87/km^{2} (2.2/sq mi)
- Time zone: UTC+1 (CET)
  - Summer (DST): UTC+2 (CEST)

Chequilla is a municipality located in the province of Guadalajara, Castile-La Mancha, Spain. According to the 2004 census (INE), the municipality has a population of 19 inhabitants.

In 2019, a law intending to replace the representative form of government underpinned by the plenary and the elected municipal councillors by the participatory model of concejo abierto, in which all the electors are part of the deliberative assembly, was passed.
