= Concejo =

Concejo is a Spanish word literally meaning "council". It may refer to

- Concejo (Álava), a type of administrative subdivision in the province of Álava, Spain
- A synonym of municipio (municipality) in Asturias, Spain; see List of municipalities in Asturias

== See also ==
- Concejo abierto
