= Iron Bridge (Talavera de la Reina) =

Bridge in Spain

Iron Bridge Puente de Hierro
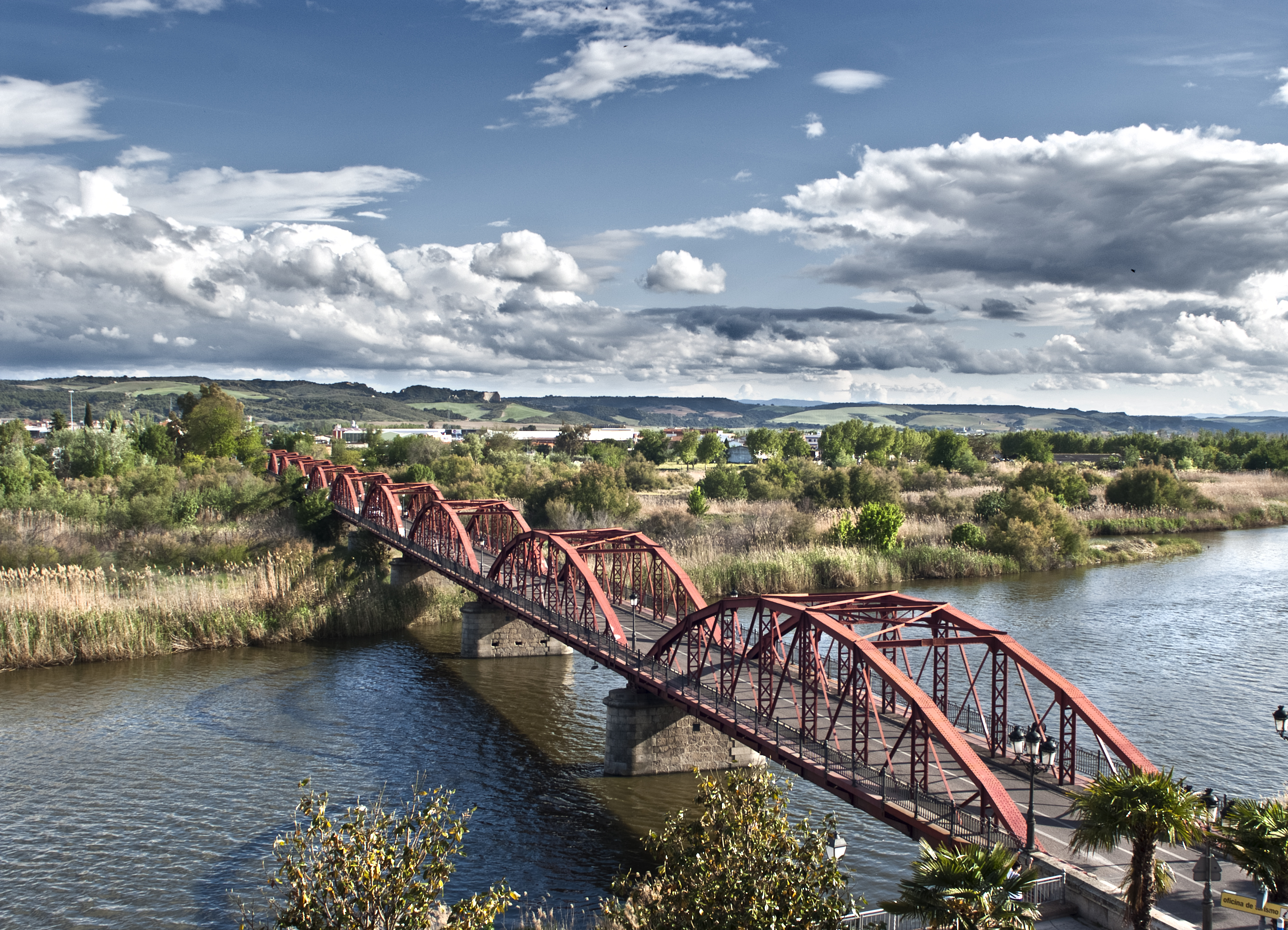
- Coordinates: 39°57′16″N 4°49′56″W
- Crosses: Tagus
- Locale: Talavera de la Reina, Spain

Characteristics
- Design: Multi-span continuous tied-arch
- Total length: 426 m
- Longest span: 41 m

History
- Opened: 25 October 1908

Location
- Interactive map of Iron Bridge

The Queen Sofía Bridge (Spanish: Puente Reina Sofía), better known as the Iron Bridge (Puente de Hierro), is a bridge in Talavera de la Reina, Spain. It crosses over the Tagus.

== History and description ==
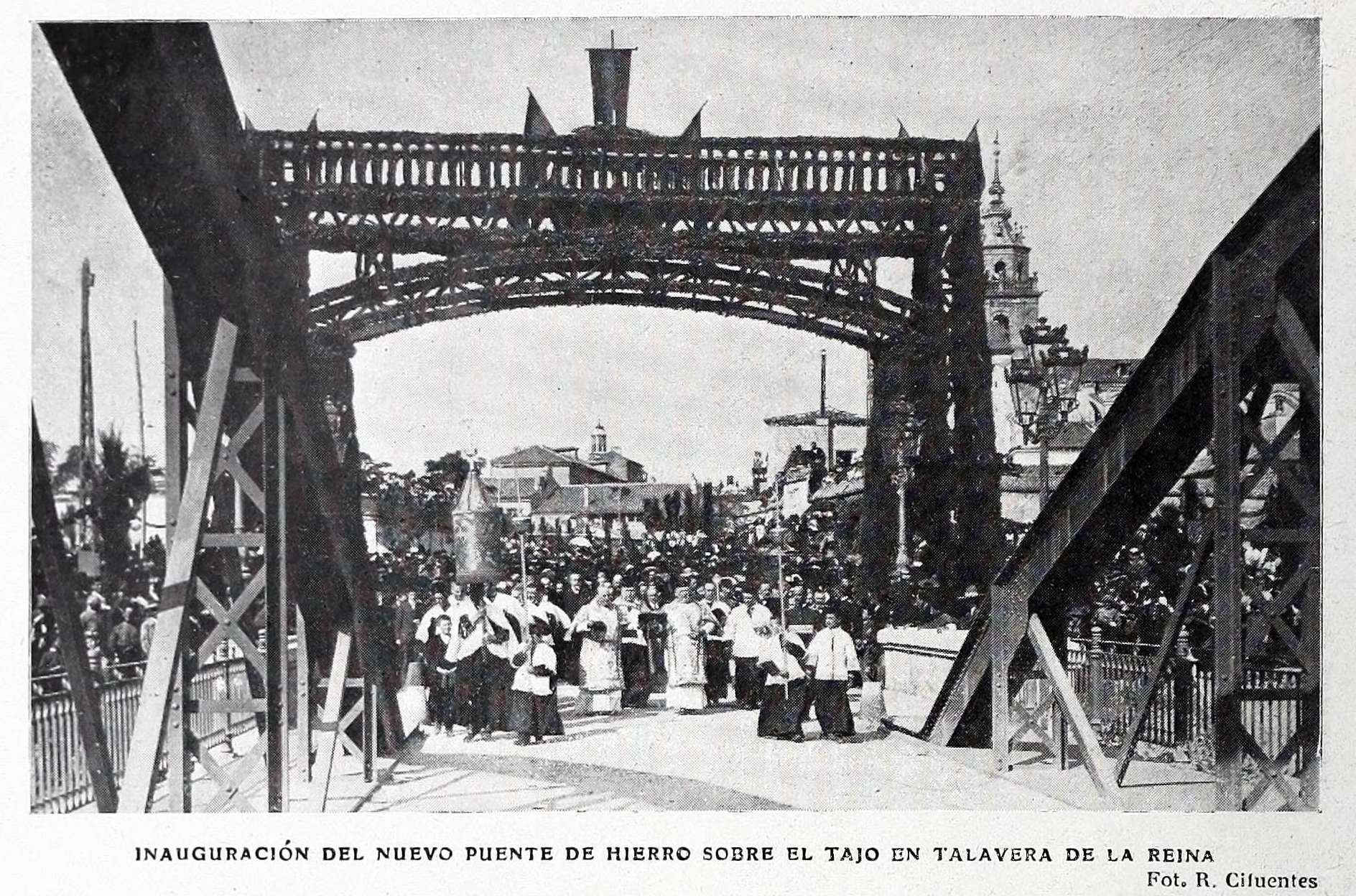
The 1908 inauguration of the bridge, in Blanco y Negro.

Following an earlier tentative project in 1879, the definitive project for the bridge was approved in 1897. The bulk of the building works took place between 1905 and 1908. Crossing over the Tagus, it displays a total length of 426 m, with 10 stretches with a homogeneous span of about 41 m.

It was opened on 25 October 1908. Following its inauguration it became a symbol of modernity in the city, that previously only had the Old Bridge as way to cross the river.

Originally coloured in bluish-gray, the bridge was painted in red in 1994.
