= El Casar de Talavera =

- EATIM
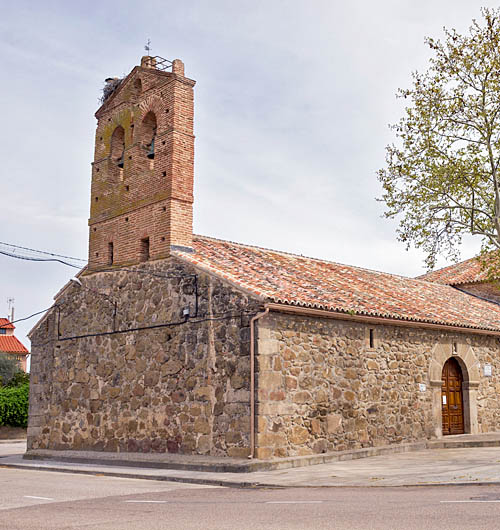

- Location within Castilla-La Mancha
- Coordinates: 39°57′46″N 4°55′04″W
- Country: Spain
- Autonomous community: Castilla–La Mancha
- Province: Toledo
- Municipality: Talavera de la Reina

Population (2019)
  - Total: 92
- Time zone: UTC+1 (CET)
  - Summer (DST): UTC+2 (CEST)
- Postal code: 45614

El Casar de Talavera (formerly El Casar del Ciego) is a EATIM ("administrative territorial entity below municipality") and village belonging to the municipality of Talavera de la Reina, province of Toledo, Castilla–La Mancha, Spain.

== History ==
The place was mentioned in the 1576 Topographic Relations of Philip II. A former municipality, El Casar del Ciego was forced to merge into the municipality of Talavera de la Reina by means of a 1845 law and a 1846 Royal Order. It was thus effectively annexed by Talavera de la Reina on 21 December 1846. El Casar constituted as EATIM on 28 April 2008.
