= Basilica of Nuestra Señora del Prado =

- Basílica de Nuestra Señora del Prado
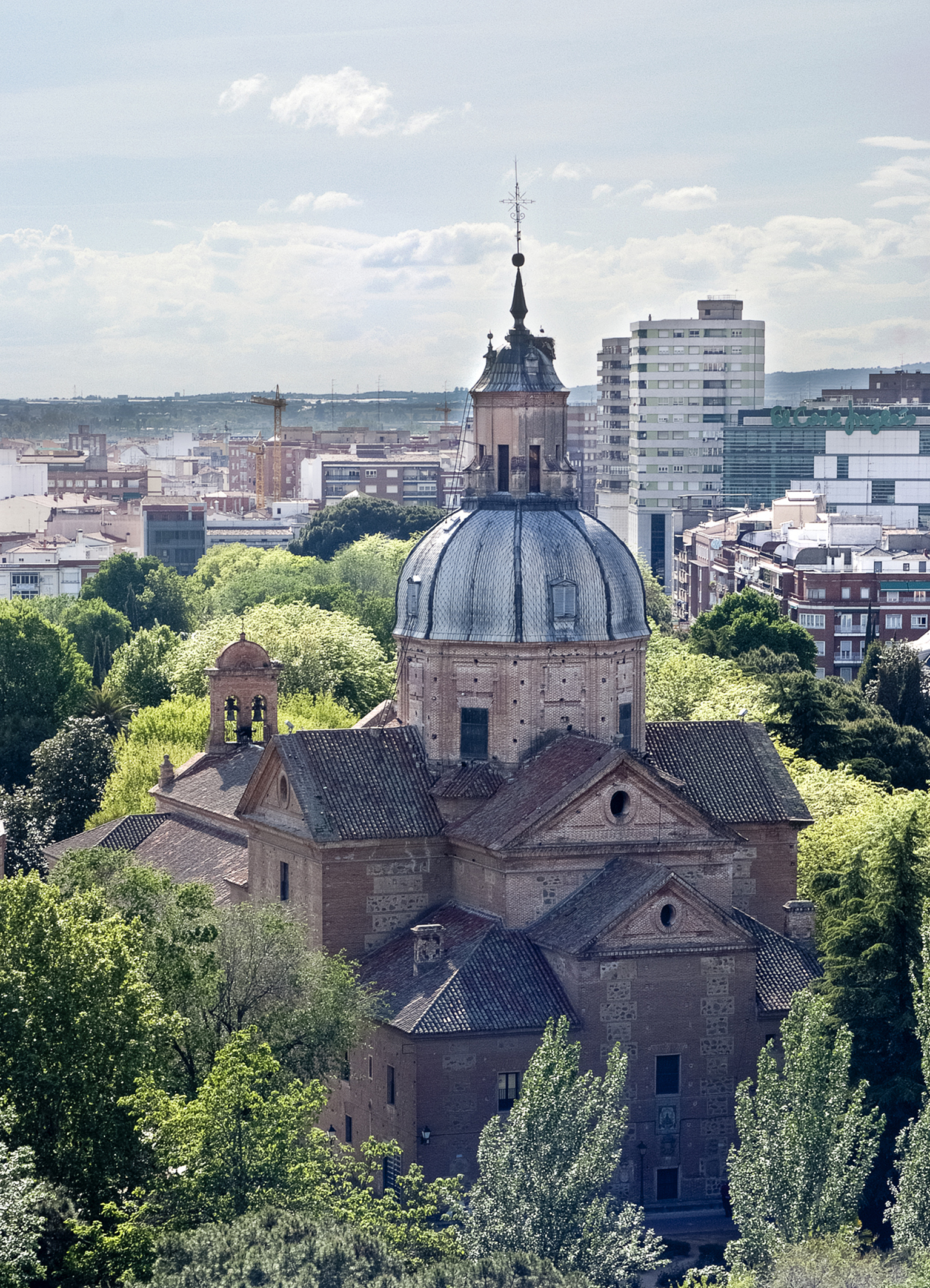
- Interactive map of the Basilica of Nuestra Señora del Prado area

General information
- Classification: Bien de Interés Cultural
- Location: Talavera de la Reina, Spain
- Coordinates: 39.961295°N 4.820759°W
- Owner: Ayuntamiento de Talavera de la Reina

The Basilica of Nuestra Señora del Prado (Spanish: Basílica de Nuestra Señora del Prado) is a Roman Catholic basilica in Talavera de la Reina, Spain.

== History and description ==
The site was originally a temple dedicated to Ceres, goddess of agriculture and cattle raising. The starting point for the current version of the building dates back to 1649, when a new building replaced a previous hermitage. It mixes Renaissance and Baroque architectural styles. The plant is shaped like a Latin cross. The main nave features a barrel vault.

The building houses a number of ornamental tiles from the 16th and 17th centuries.

Proclaimed as "minor basilica" by John Paul II on 14 February 1989, it was consecrated as such in November 1989.

It was declared Bien de Interés Cultural in 1993 along the nearby gardens. The building is a municipal property.

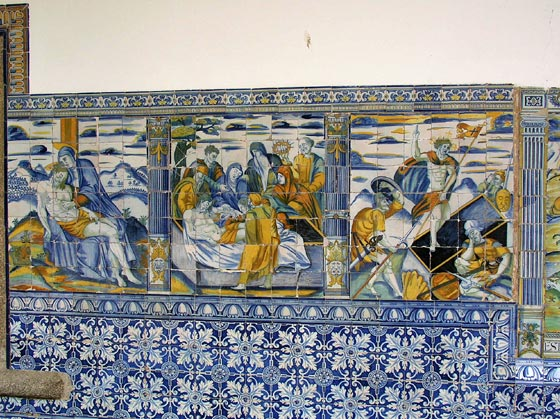
Ornamental tiles

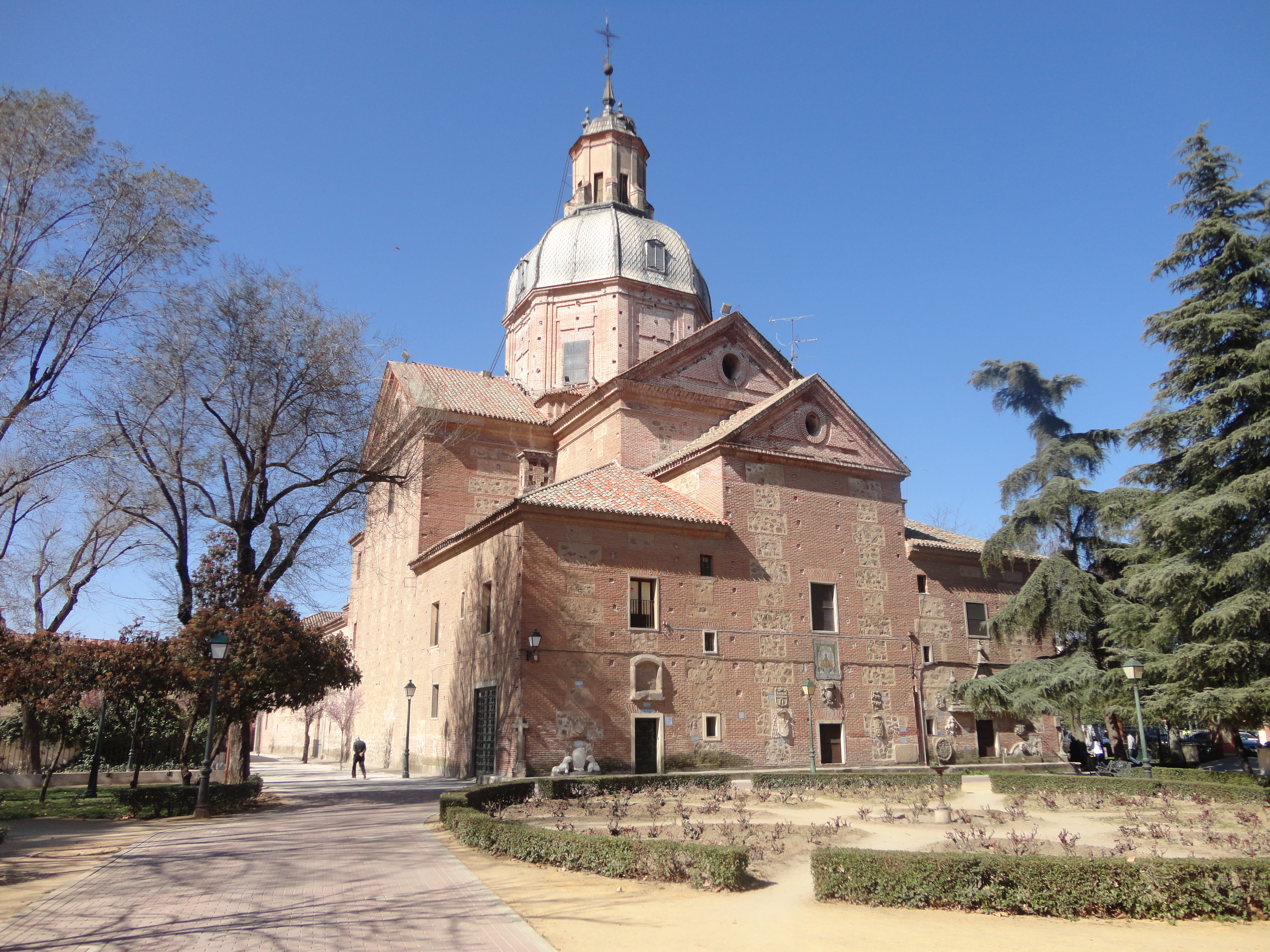
Alternative view

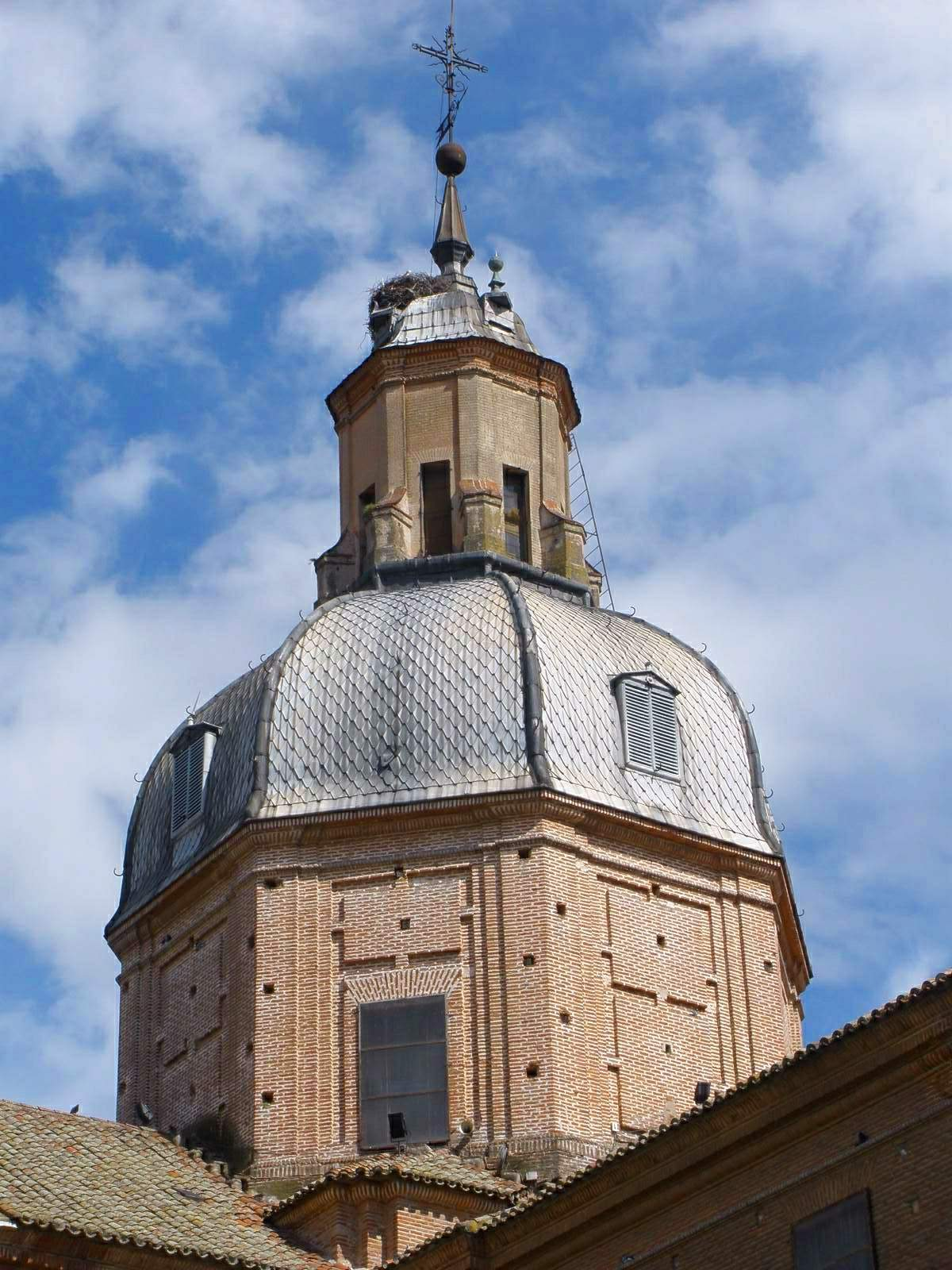
Detail of the dome
