= Castilla–La Mancha Bridge =

Castilla–La Mancha Bridge Puente de Castilla-La Mancha
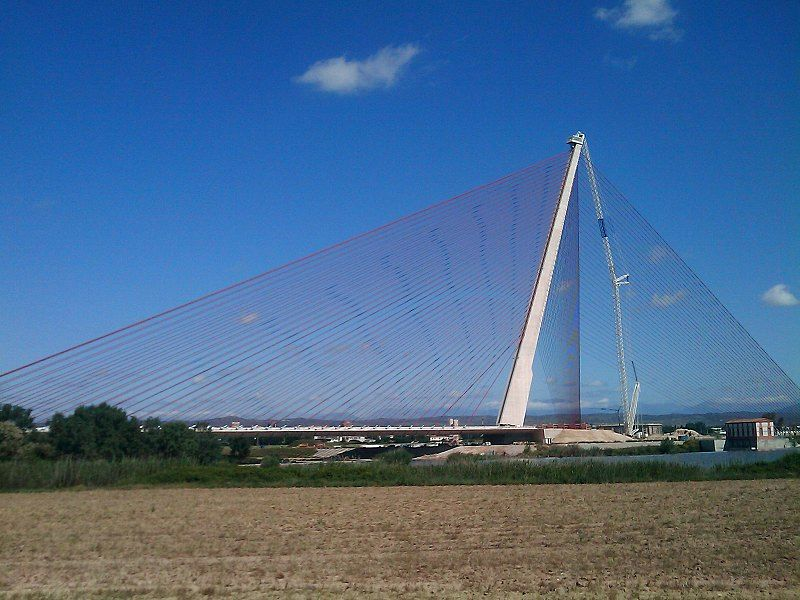
- Coordinates: 39°57′2″N 4°48′22″W
- Carries: 2 lanes of motor vehicles on each side
- Crosses: Tagus
- Locale: Talavera de la Reina, Spain
- Preceded by: Puente de la TO-1262
- Followed by: Puente del Príncipe

Characteristics
- Design: Cable-stayed bridge
- Total length: 730 m
- Width: 43.50 m
- Height: 192 m
- Longest span: 318 m

History
- Architect: Francisco Sánchez de León
- Engineering design by: Ramón Sánchez de León
- Constructed by: Sacyr, Aglomancha and J. Bárcenas
- Opened: 17 October 2011

Location
- Interactive map of Castilla–La Mancha Bridge

The Castilla–La Mancha Bridge (Spanish: Puente de Castilla-La Mancha) is a cable-stayed bridge in Talavera de la Reina, Spain.

== History and description ==
Promoted by the Regional Government of Castile-La Mancha, the foundation stone was laid in November 2007. It was opened on 17 October 2011. The building companies were Sacyr, Aglomancha and J. Bárcenas.

Standing 192 m high, it was the tallest cable-stayed bridge in Spain upon the time of its inauguration. It features 152 wire ropes.

With a total cost of nearly €74M, it was widely considered a waste of money in the media. With the opening of the so-called Variante Suroeste of the N-502 in March 2015, the bridge—via the Ronda del Tajo—is expected to finally help to drive the heavy-duty vehicle traffic out of the city center. As the bridge carried little traffic, it was often referred to as "the bridge to nowhere."

While strictly prohibited, since 2016, multiple incidents related to illegal climbers have been reported. On 13 October 2024, a 26-year-old British free-climber, Lewis Stevenson died after falling while climbing the bridge after falling ill; a coroner later ruled the death accidental. Stevenson was accompanied by a 24-year-old, both had reportedly traveled to the area to create content for social media.

In the third decade of the 21st century, it was often used as a drinking place or a place for illegal automobile racing.
