= Regimiento =

Form of local government

The regimiento, cabildo de regidores or concejo cerrado ("closed council") was a system of local government established from the 14h century onwards in the Crown of Castile. A feature of the progressive oligarchization of the form of government in the cities, the change from the overruled concejo abierto system entailed a reduction of the government to a relatively small number of regidores. Urban oligarchies intended to fully capture the nomination of the regidores (appointed by the monarch in the case of realengo) since the beginning. The bulk of the establishment of the new regime chiefly took place between 1345 and the later years of the reign of Alfonso XI of Castile.

== See also ==
- Regidor
- Cabildo (council)
