= Concejo abierto =

Institution charged with local government and administration in Spain

The concejo abierto (literally: "open council") is a system of government and administration of some very small Spanish municipalities and sub-municipal territorial units. An example of direct democracy, the system allows for the existence of a mayor and a consejo (English: council) or asamblea vecinal (English: neighbourhood assembly) formed by all the electors of the municipality. In contrast, the conventional system used by most municipalities is the ayuntamiento, often translated as city, town or municipal council in English, comprised (in its most basic form) of the local councillors who form the plenary (elected in a party-list proportional representation voting), and the Mayor, elected in turn by the councillors among themselves.

== History ==
The origins of the system trace back to the Middle Ages, as a custom primarily originated in the Kingdoms of León and Castile, although it also extended to other territories as well, chiefly in the north of the Iberian Peninsula. In many settlements, the concejo abierto was replaced by the "regimiento" system (also called consejo cerrado, "close council"), in which a decision-making body of limited size formed by judges or alcaldes as well as a number of regidores appointed by the King was contemplated; in the case of Castile, this process chiefly took place between 1345 and the later years of the rule of Alfonso XI.

The contemporary form of the concejo abierto is recognised in the 1978 Spanish Constitution.

== Basque Country ==
The best-known example of the Spanish town meeting system of government was found in the Middle Ages in the Basque Country of northern Spain. Known as the anteiglesia (literally "in front of the church" from the Latin ante - and not anti) all the residents of a town would meet outside the door of the largest church and vote on local matters. They would also elect a sindico to represent them in the regional assembly. The village or town was divided into cofradías, which dealt with day-to-day administration in each of the town's parishes.

The system was revived in the municipality of Iurreta, Biscay, in 1990.

== See also ==
- Local government in Spain
- Town meeting

== Bibliography ==
- Cosculluela Montaner, Luis (1987). "El Concejo Abierto" [The Open Council]. Reala. Revista de Estudios de la Administración Local y Autonómica (in Spanish) (234). Madrid: Instituto Nacional de Administración Pública: 199–224. ISSN 1989-8975.
- Monsalvo Antón, José María (1990). "La sociedad política en los concejos castellanos de la Meseta durante la época del Regimiento medieval. La distribución social del poder" (PDF). Concejos y ciudades en la Edad Media hispánica (II Congreso de la Fundación Sánchez-Albornoz, León, 1989) [Councils and cities in the Spanish middle ages] (in Spanish). pp. 359–413.
- "The Spanish Constitution" (PDF). Agencia Estatal Boletín Oficial del Estado. 1978.
