= Cubillejo de la Sierra =

Village in Guadalajara, Spain

Coordinates: 40°53′N 1°46′W

Cubillejo de la Sierra is a small village in the municipality of Molina de Aragón, in the province of Guadalajara (Spain). It has a population of 51 inhabitants (INE 2016).

Villages close to Cubillejo de la Sierra are Campillo de Dueñas and La Yunta.

Within the municipality, the highest peak is Pico del Aguila, at 1444 metres.

== Monuments ==
- Ermita de la Vega hermitage.
- Pairón de la Virgen del Buen Suceso.
- Pairón de las Ánimas

== Bibliography ==
- Heredia, F.J.; Marco, J.A., and Sanz, C. Cubillejo de la Sierra, historia, arte y sociedad. Ediciones Aache. Guadalajara, 2002. ISBN 84-95179-72-5
