= Style of the Portuguese sovereign =

The style of Portuguese sovereign has varied over the years. Currently, there is no Portuguese monarch but there is a pretender: Duarte Pio, Duke of Braganza. He styles himself following some of the ancient traditions of the Portuguese monarchy.

== Style of title ==
During the history of Portuguese monarchy, the Portuguese kings used the following styles:

| Time | Style | Used by | Reason |
|---|---|---|---|
| 1128–1129 | By the Grace of God, Duke of Portugal (Dei Gratiæ, Dux Portugalliæ) | Afonso I | |
| 1129–1139 | By the Grace of God, Prince of Portugal (Dei Gratiæ, Princeps Portugalliæ) | Afonso I | |
| 1140–1189 | By the Grace of God, King of the Portuguese (Dei Gratiæ, Rex Portugalensium) | Afonso I, Sancho I | |
| 1189–1191 | By the Grace of God, King of Portugal and Silves (Dei Gratiæ, Rex Portugalliæ et Silbis) | Sancho I | Conquest of Silves (1189) |
| 1191–1248 | By the Grace of God, King of Portugal (Dei Gratiæ, Rex Portugaliæ) | Sancho I, Afonso II, Sancho II | Loss of Silves to the Almohads (1191) |
| 1248–1249 | By the Grace of God, King of Portugal and Count of Boulogne (Dei Gratiæ, Rex Portugaliæ & Comes Boloniæ) | Afonso III | Afonso, married to Matilda II, Countess of Boulogne-sur-Mer, succeeds his brother Sancho on the Portuguese throne (January 1248) |
| 1249–1253 | By the Grace of God, King of Portugal and the Algarve, Count of Boulogne (Dei Gratiæ, Rex Portugaliæ & Algarbii & Comes Boloniæ) | Afonso III | Conquest of the Moorish kingdom of the Algarve (Al'Garb Al'Andalus) (1249) |
| 1253–1369 | By the Grace of God, King of Portugal and the Algarve (Dei Gratiæ, Rex Portugaliæ & Algarbii) | Afonso III, Denis, Afonso IV, Peter I, Ferdinand I | Afonso III repudiates Matilda and relinquishes his title of Count (1253) |
| 1369–1371 | By the Grace of God, King of Castile, León, Portugal, Toledo, Galicia, Seville, Córdoba, Murcia, Jaén, the Algarve, and Algeciras and Lord of Molina | Ferdinand I | Ferndinand I of Portugal is a pretender to the Castilian Crown, being a legitimate great-grandson of Sancho IV of Castile (1369) |
| 1371–1383 | By the Grace of God, King of Portugal and the Algarve | Ferdinand I | Renunciation of Castilian titles after the Peace of Alcoutim (1371) |
| 1385–1415 | By the Grace of God, King of Portugal and the Algarve | John I | Election of the Portuguese king (6 April 1385) |
| 1415–1458 | By the Grace of God, King of Portugal and the Algarve and Lord of Ceuta | John I, Edward I, Afonso V | Conquest of Ceuta (1415) |
| 1458–1471 | By the Grace of God, King of Portugal and the Algarve and Lord of Ceuta and Alcácer in Africa | Afonso V | Conquest of El Ksar as-Saghir (Alcácer-Ceguer) (1458) |
| 1471–1475 | By the Grace of God, King of Portugal and the Algarves on this side of the seas and beyond them in Africa | Afonso V | Conquest of Asilah and Tangiers (1471) and elevation of the Portuguese lordship in northern Africa to the condition of Kingdom of the Algarve Beyond the Sea |
| 1475–1479 | By the Grace of God, King of Castile, León, Portugal, Toledo, Galicia, Seville, Cordoba, Jaén, Murcia, the Algarves on this side of the seas and beyond them in Africa, Gibraltar, and Algeciras and Lord of Biscay and Molina | Afonso V | Pretension of Afonso V to the Castilian Crown, due to his marriage with Joan, Princess of Castile (1475) |
| 1479–1485 | By the Grace of God, King of Portugal and the Algarves on this side of the seas and beyond them in Africa | Afonso V, John II | Renunciation of the Castilian titles after the Treaty of Alcáçovas (1479) |
| 1485–1499 | By the Grace of God, King of Portugal and the Algarves on this side of the seas and beyond them in Africa and Lord of Guinea | John II, Manuel I | Creation of the Lordship of Guinea, comprising the Portuguese colonies on the Gulf of Guinea (1485) |
| 1499–1580 | By the Grace of God, King of Portugal and the Algarves on this side of the seas and beyond them in Africa, Lord of Guinea and of Conquest, Navigation, and Commerce of Ethiopia, Arabia, Persia, and India, etc. | Manuel I, John III, Sebastian, Henry, António, Prior of Crato | The return of Vasco da Gama from India in 1499 |
| 1581–1640 | By the Grace of God, King of Castile, León, Aragon, the two Sicilies, Jerusalem, Portugal, Navarre, Granada, Toledo, Valencia, Galicia, Majorca, Seville, Sardinia, Cordoba, Corsica, Murcia, Jaén, the Algarves, Algeciras, Gibraltar, the Canary Islands, the Eastern & Western Indies, and the Islands & Mainland of the Ocean Sea, Count of Barcelona, Lord of Biscay and Molina, Duke of Athens and Neopatria, Count of Roussillon and Cerdagne, Margrave of Oristano and Goceano, Archduke of Austria, Duke of Burgundy, Brabant, and Milan, Count of Habsburg, Flanders, Tyrol, etc. | Philip I, Philip II, Philip III | Personal union with Spain |
| 1640–1815 | By the Grace of God, King [or Queen] of Portugal and the Algarves before and beyond the sea in Africa, Lord of Guinea and of Conquest, Navigation, and Commerce of Ethiopia, Arabia, Persia, and India, etc. (Dei gratia rex Portugaliæ & Algarbiorum citra ultraque mare in Africa, dominus Guineæ, atque expugnationis, navigationis, & commercii Æthiopiæ, Arabiæ, Persiæ, & Indiæ, &c.) | John IV, Afonso VI, Peter II, João V, Joseph I, Maria I (with Peter III) | Restoration of an independent Portugal |
| 1815–1822 | By the Grace of God, King [or Queen] of the United Kingdom of Portugal, Brazil and the Algarves on this side of the seas and beyond them in Africa, Lord of Guinea and of Conquest, Navigation, and Commerce of Ethiopia, Arabia, Persia, and India, etc. | Maria I, John VI | Creation of the Kingdom of Brazil (1815) |
| 1822–1823 | By the Grace of God and by the Constitution of the Monarchy, King of the United Kingdom of Portugal, Brazil and the Algarves on this side of the seas and beyond them in Africa, Lord of Guinea and of Conquest, Navigation, and Commerce of Ethiopia, Arabia, Persia, and India, etc. | John VI | Approval of the first Portuguese Constitution (1822) |
| 1823–1825 | By the Grace of God, King of the United Kingdom of Portugal, Brazil and the Algarves on this side of the seas and beyond them in Africa, Lord of Guinea and of Conquest, Navigation, and Commerce of Ethiopia, Arabia, Persia, and India, etc. | John VI | Suspension of the first Portuguese Constitution after the Vilafrancada coup |
| 1825–1826 | By the Grace of God, [Titular] Emperor of Brazil, King of Portugal and the Algarves on this side of the seas and beyond them in Africa, Lord of Guinea and of Conquest, Navigation, and Commerce of Ethiopia, Arabia, Persia, and India, etc. | John VI | Brazilian independence |
| 1826 | By the Grace of God and Unanimous Acclamation of the People, Constitutional Emperor and Perpetual Defender of Brazil, King of Portugal and the Algarves on this side of the seas and beyond them in Africa, Lord of Guinea and of Conquest, Navigation, and Commerce of Ethiopia, Arabia, Persia, and India, etc. | Pedro IV | Personal Union of Portugal and Brazil |
| 1826–1838 | By the Grace of God, King [or Queen] of Portugal and the Algarves on this side of the seas and beyond them in Africa, Lord of Guinea and of Conquest, Navigation, and Commerce of Ethiopia, Arabia, Persia, and India, etc. | Maria II, Miguel I, Maria II (with Ferdinand II) | Peter's abdication of Portugal |
| 1838–1842 | By the Grace of God and by the Constitution of the Monarchy, King [or Queen] of Portugal and the Algarves on this side of the seas and beyond them in Africa, Lord of Guinea and of Conquest, Navigation, and Commerce of Ethiopia, Arabia, Persia, and India, etc. | Maria II (with Ferdinand II) | The Portuguese Constitution of 1838 |
| 1842–1910 | By the Grace of God, King [or Queen] of Portugal and the Algarves on this side of the seas and beyond them in Africa, Lord of Guinea and of Conquest, Navigation, and Commerce of Ethiopia, Arabia, Persia, and India, etc. | Maria II (with Ferdinand II), Pedro V, Luís I, Carlos I, Manuel II | The Portuguese Constitutional Chart of 1826 was restored |

== Style of address ==
The attribute of the Portuguese sovereign also changed several times as well:

| Time | Attribute |
|---|---|
| 1139–c. 1433 | His Grace (Sua Mercê) |
| c. 1433–1577 | His Highness (Sua Alteza) |
| 1577–1578 | His Majesty (Sua Majestade) |
| 1578–1580 | His Royal Highness (Sua Alteza Real) |
| 1580–1748 | His Majesty (Sua Majestade) |
| 1748–1825 | His/Her Most Faithful Majesty (Sua Majestade Fidelíssima) |
| 1825–1826 | His Imperial and Royal Majesty (Sua Majestade Imperial e Real) |
| 1826–1910 | His/Her Most Faithful Majesty (Sua Majestade Fidelíssima) |

== See also ==
- List of titles and honours of the Portuguese Crown
- List of Portuguese monarchs
