= Tordelpalo =

- Village
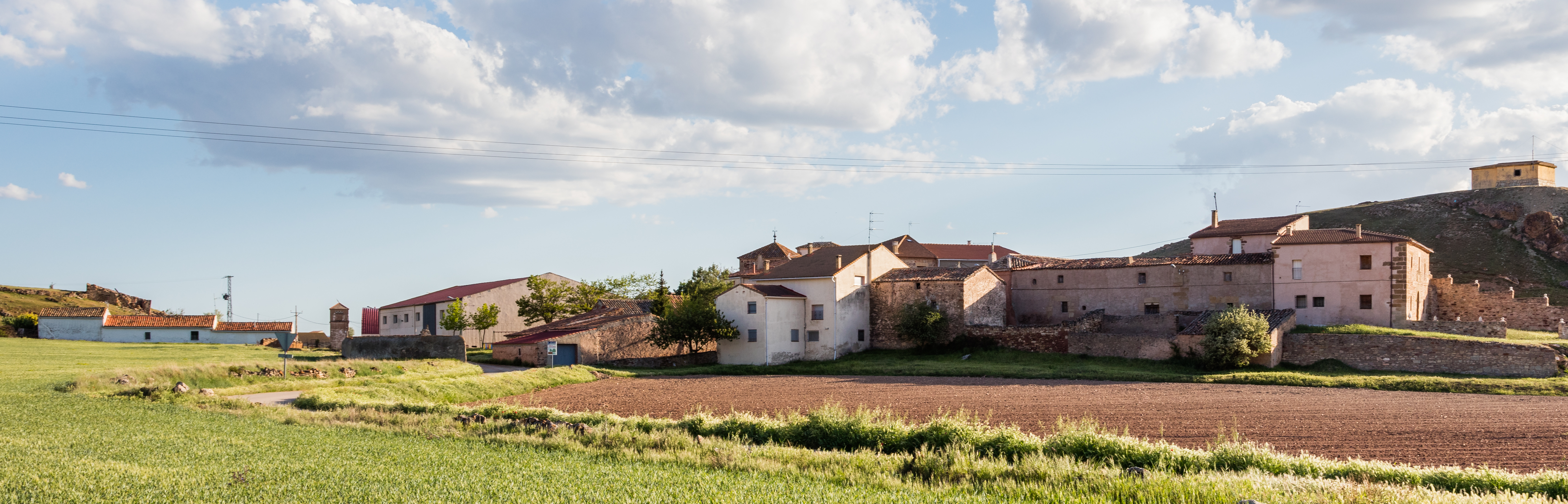

- Location within Province of Guadalajara Location within Spain
- Coordinates: 40°49′39″N 1°47′42″W
- Country: Spain
- Autonomous community: Castilla–La Mancha
- Province: Province of Guadalajara
- Municipality: Molina de Aragón
- Elevation: 1,167 m (3,829 ft)

Population
  - Total: 6

Tordelpalo is a hamlet located in the municipality of Molina de Aragón, in Guadalajara province, Castilla–La Mancha, Spain. As of 2020, it had a population of 6.

== Geography ==
Tordelpalo is located 148km east of Guadalajara, Spain.
