= Anchuela del Pedregal =

- Village
- Location within Province of Guadalajara Location within Spain
- Coordinates: 40°50′36″N 1°48′32″W
- Country: Spain
- Autonomous community: Castilla–La Mancha
- Province: Province of Guadalajara
- Municipality: Molina de Aragón
- Elevation: 1,152 m (3,780 ft)

Population
  - Total: 12

Anchuela del Pedregal is a hamlet located in the municipality of Molina de Aragón, in Guadalajara province, Castilla–La Mancha, Spain. As of 2020, it has a population of 12.

== Geography ==
Anchuela del Pedregal is located 148 km east-northeast of Guadalajara, Spain.
