= List of Portuguese monarchs =

King of Portugal and the Algarves (1139–1910)
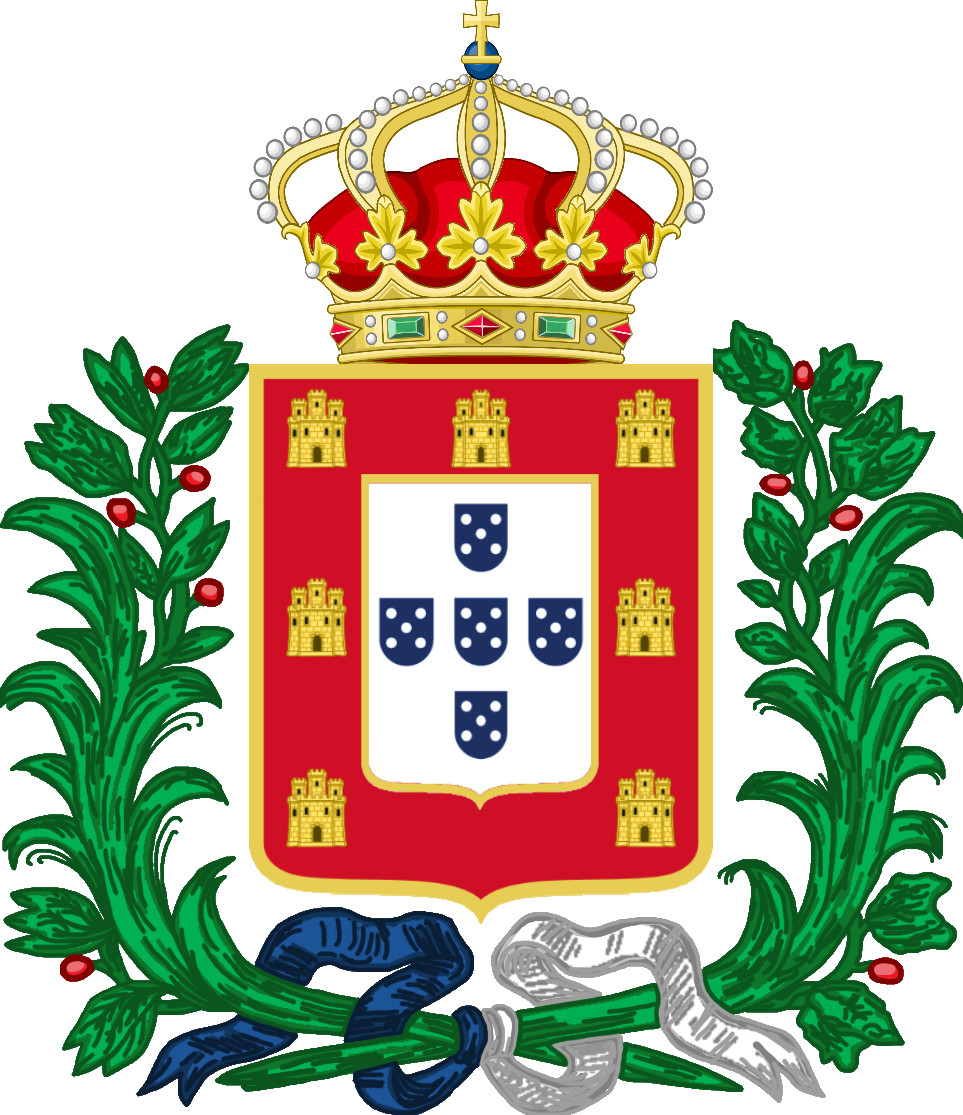
- Royal Coat of Arms of Portugal

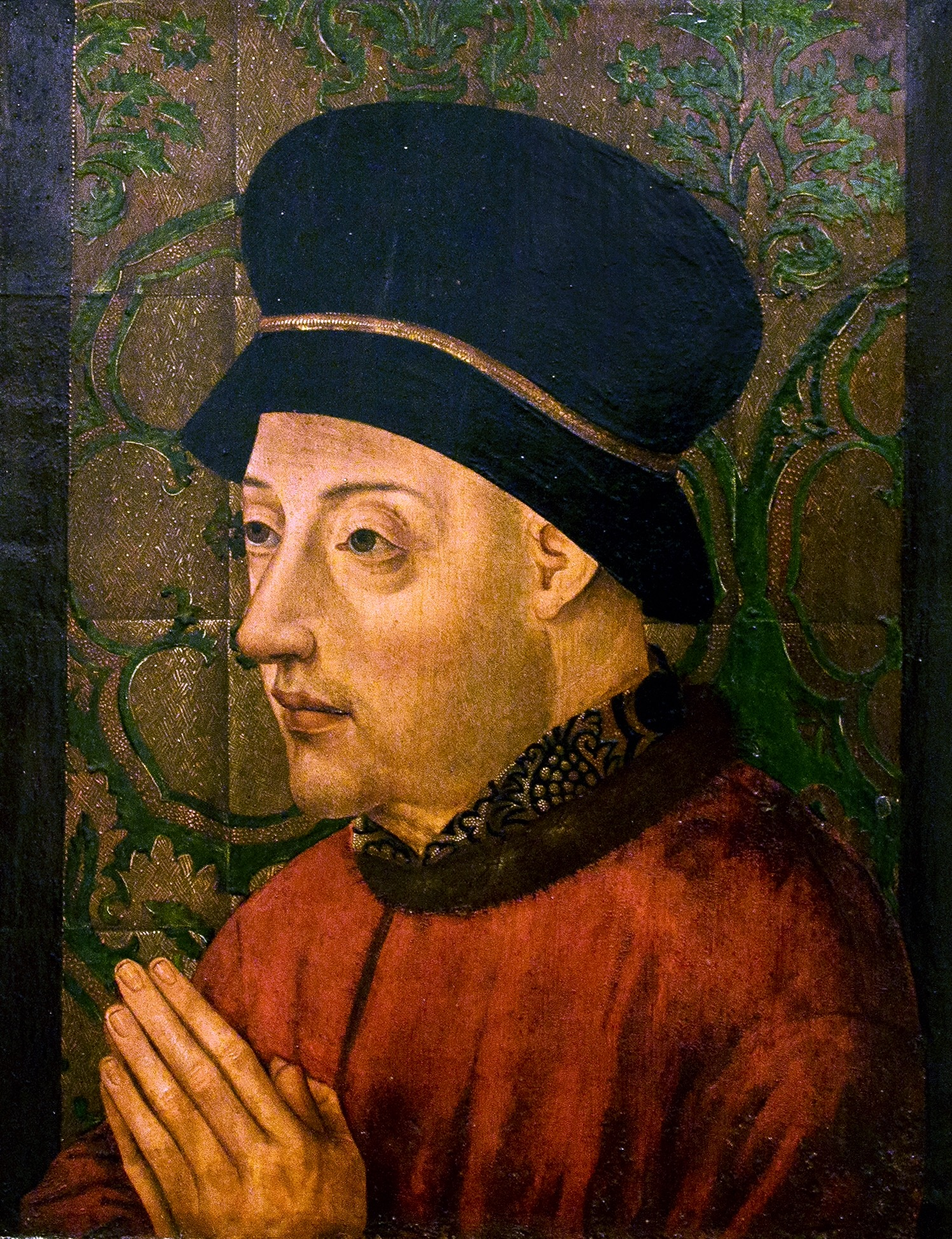
- Longest reigning monarch John I 6 April 1385 – 14 August 1433
- Dom Duarte Pio, Duke of Braganza, claimant of the dormant throne

Details
- Style: His/Her Most Faithful Majesty
- First monarch: Afonso I
- Last monarch: Manuel II
- Formed: 25 July 1139
- Abolished: 5 October 1910
- Residence: Royal residences in Portugal
- Pretender: Disputed

This is a list of Portuguese monarchs who ruled from the establishment of the Kingdom of Portugal, in 1139, to the deposition of the Portuguese monarchy and creation of the Portuguese Republic with the 5 October 1910 revolution.

Through the nearly 800 years in which Portugal was a monarchy, the kings held various other titles and pretensions. Two kings of Portugal, Ferdinand I and Afonso V, claimed the crown of Castile and waged wars in order to enforce their respective claims. Ferdinand I managed to be recognized as King of Galiza in 1369, although his dominance of the region was short-lived. When the House of Habsburg came into power, the kings of Spain, Naples, and Sicily also became kings of Portugal. The House of Braganza brought numerous titles to the Portuguese Crown – some honorary, such as the attribution of the title of Rex Fidelissimus (His Most Faithful Majesty), and royal titles, such as King of Brazil and then de jure Emperor of Brazil.

Throughout Portugal's history as an independent kingdom, it was ruled by a total of 4 royal houses:

1. House of Burgundy (or Afonsine Dynasty, 1139–1383)
2. House of Aviz (or Johanine Dynasty, 1385–1580)
3. House of Habsburg (or Philippine Dynasty, 1581–1640)
4. House of Braganza (or Brigantine Dynasty, 1640–1910)

The House of Burgundy actually held the title of Count of Portugal beginning in 1096. However, all but the most comprehensive lists of Portuguese monarchs exclude such pre-independence figures.

== House of Burgundy (Afonsine Dynasty, 1139–1383) ==
The Portuguese House of Burgundy (Portuguese: Casa de Borgonha) was established in 1093 under Henry, Count of Portugal ruled the feudal County of Portugal, of the Kingdom of Galicia. When Afonso Henriques was proclaimed King of Portugal by his troops in 1139, he turned the family from a comital house to a royal house which would rule Portugal for over two centuries, establishing the Afonsine Dynasty (Dinastia Afonsina). During the Reconquista, the Afonsine Dynasty expanded the country southwards until the definitive conquest of Algarve with Sancho II and the establishment of the Kingdom of Algarve, in 1249, under Afonso III. When Ferdinand I died, an interregnum occurred between 1383 and 1385. Ferdinand's daughter Beatrice of Portugal was proclaimed queen and her husband John I of Castile proclaimed king by the right of his wife. Her legitimacy as a monarch is disputed.

| Name | Lifespan | Reign start | Reign end | Notes | Family | Image |
|---|---|---|---|---|---|---|
| Afonso I: The Conqueror; The Great; The Founder; The Father of the Nation; Portuguese: Afonso Henriques | 1106/09/11 – 6 December 1185 (aged 73–79) | 25 July 1139 | 6 December 1185 | Previously Count of Portugal; Founder of the Kingdom of Portugal; Son of Henry of Burgundy and Teresa of León | Burgundy | |
| Sancho I: The Populator | 11 November 1154 – 26 March 1211 (aged 56) | 6 December 1185 | 26 March 1211 | Son of Afonso I | Burgundy | |
| Afonso II: The Fat; The Leprous; The Lawgiver | 23 April 1185 – 25 March 1223 (aged 37) | 26 March 1211 | 25 March 1223 | Son of Sancho I | Burgundy | |
| Sancho II: The Cowled; The Pious | 8 September 1209 – 4 January 1248 (aged 38) | 25 March 1223 | 4 December 1247 | Son of Afonso II | Burgundy | |
| Afonso III: The Boulonnais | 5 May 1210 – 16 February 1279 (aged 68) | 4 January 1248 | 16 February 1279 | Son of Afonso II; Brother of Sancho II | Burgundy | |
| Denis I: The Farmer; The Farmer-King; The Husbandman; The Poet; The Poet-King; The Troubadour; The Just; The Liberal; Portuguese: Dinis I | 9 October 1261 – 7 January 1325 (aged 63) | 16 February 1279 | 7 January 1325 | Son of Afonso III | Burgundy | |
| Afonso IV: The Brave; The Bold | 8 February 1291 – 28 May 1357 (aged 66) | 7 January 1325 | 28 May 1357 | Son of Denis I | Burgundy | |
| Peter I: The Cruel; The Just; The Enemy-Son; The Stutterer; The Till-the-End-of-the-World-Passionate; The Vengeful; The Revengeful; Portuguese: Pedro I | 8 April 1320 – 18 January 1367 (aged 46) | 28 May 1357 | 18 January 1367 | Son of Afonso IV | Burgundy | |
| Ferdinand I: The Handsome; The Fair; The Debonair; The Inconstant; The Fickle; The Inconscient; Portuguese: Fernando I | 31 October 1345 – 22 October 1383 (aged 37) | 18 January 1367 | 22 October 1383 | Son of Peter I | Burgundy | |
| Beatrice: Portuguese: Beatriz | 7–13 February 1373 – c. 1420 (aged 46–47) | (Disputed) 1383 | (Disputed) 1385 | Daughter of Ferdinand I | Burgundy | |

== House of Aviz (Johanine Dynasty, 1385–1580) ==
The House of Aviz (Portuguese: Casa de Avis), succeeded the House of Burgundy as the reigning house of the Kingdom of Portugal. The house was founded by John, Master of Aviz, thus establishing the Johanine Dynasty (Dinastia Joanina). When King John II of Portugal died without an heir, the throne of Portugal passed to his cousin, Manuel, Duke of Beja. When King Sebastian of Portugal died, the throne passed to his Grand-uncle, Henry of Portugal (he might be called Henry II because Henry, Count of Portugal, father of Alphonso I of Portugal, was the first of that name to rule Portugal). When Henry died, a succession crisis occurred and António, Prior of Crato, was proclaimed António of Portugal.

| Name | Lifespan | Reign start | Reign end | Notes | Family | Image |
|---|---|---|---|---|---|---|
| John I: Of Good Memory; The One with Good Memory; Of Fond Memory; The Master of Avis; The Good; The Great; The Bastard; Portuguese: João I | 11 April 1357 – 14 August 1433 (aged 76) | 6 April 1385 | 14 August 1433 | Illegitimate son of Peter I | Aviz | |
| Edward: The Eloquent; The Philosopher; The Philosopher-King; Portuguese: Duarte I | 31 October 1391 – 9 September 1438 (aged 46) | 14 August 1433 | 9 September 1438 | Son of John I | Aviz | |
| Afonso V: The African; The Crusader | 15 January 1432 – 28 August 1481 (aged 49) | 13 September 1438 15 November 1477 | 11 November 1477 28 August 1481 | Son of Edward I | Aviz | |
| John II: The Perfect Prince; The Man (O Homem); Portuguese: João II | 3 March 1455 – 25 October 1495 (aged 40) | 11 November 1477 28 August 1481 | 15 November 1477 25 October 1495 | Son of Afonso V | Aviz | |
| Manuel I: The Fortunate; The Grocer King/The Spices King (O Rei das Especiarias) | 31 May 1469 – 13 December 1521 (aged 52) | 25 October 1495 | 13 December 1521 | Cousin of John II; Grandson of Edward I | Aviz | |
| John III: The Pious; The Colonizer; Portuguese: João III | 7 June 1502 – 11 June 1557 (aged 55) | 13 December 1521 | 11 June 1557 | Son of Manuel I | Aviz | |
| Sebastian I: The Desired; The Sleeping Hero; The Sleeping King; The Hidden; The Crusader; The Virgin King; Portuguese: Sebastião I | 20 January 1554 – 4 August 1578 (aged 24) | 11 June 1557 | 4 August 1578 | Grandson of John III | Aviz | |
| Henry I: The Chaste; The Cardinal; The Cardinal-King; Portuguese: Henrique I | 31 January 1512 – 31 January 1580 (aged 68) | 4 August 1578 | 31 January 1580 | Son of Manuel I Brother of John III; Great-uncle of Sebastian | Aviz | |
| Anthony I: The Prior of Crato; The Determined; The Fighter; The Resistant; The Independentist; Portuguese: António I | 1531 – 28 August 1595 (aged 64) | (Disputed) 24 July 1580 | (Disputed) 25 August 1583 | Grandson of Manuel I Nephew of Henry I | Aviz | |

== House of Habsburg (Philippine Dynasty, 1581–1640) ==
The House of Habsburg (Portuguese: Casa de Habsburgo, Casa da Áustria) ruled Portugal from 1581 to 1640. The dynasty began with the acclamation of Philip II of Spain as Philip I of Portugal in 1580, officially recognized in 1581 by the Portuguese Cortes of Tomar. Philip I swore to rule Portugal as a kingdom separate from his Spanish domains, under a personal union known historiographically as the Iberian Union. Following the convention of Portuguese dynasties being named after their first king, this dynasty is named the Philippine Dynasty (Dinastia Filipina), an especially apt name given all Habsburg monarchs of Portugal would bear the name "Philip".

| Name | Lifespan | Reign start | Reign end | Notes | Family | Image |
|---|---|---|---|---|---|---|
| Philip I: The Prudent; Portuguese: Filipe I | 21 May 1527 – 13 September 1598 (aged 71) | 17 April 1581 | 13 September 1598 | Grandson of Manuel I Nephew of Henry I | Habsburg | King Philip I |
| Philip II: The Pious; Portuguese: Filipe II | 14 April 1578 – 31 March 1621 (aged 42) | 13 September 1598 | 31 March 1621 | Son of Philip I | Habsburg | King Philip II |
| Philip III: The Great; The Tyrant; The Oppressor; Portuguese: Filipe III | 8 April 1605 – 17 September 1665 (aged 60) | 31 March 1621 | 1 December 1640 | Son of Philip II | Habsburg | King Philip II |

== House of Braganza (Brigantine Dynasty, 1640–1910) ==
The House of Braganza (Portuguese: Casa de Bragança) came to power in 1640, when John II, Duke of Braganza, claimed to be the rightful heir of the defunct House of Aviz, as he was the great-great-grandson of King Manuel I. John was proclaimed King John IV, and he deposed the House of Habsburg in 1640 during the Portuguese Restoration War. The Habsburgs continued to claim the throne of Portugal until the end of the war in the Treaty of Lisbon (1668). Unlike other dynasties, it is not dubbed after its founder (as John IV shares a first name with John I), instead being called the Brigantine Dynasty (Dinastia Brigantina, "Brigantine" meaning "from Braganza").

The descendants of Queen Maria II and her consort, King Ferdinand II (a German prince of the House of Saxe-Coburg and Gotha), came to rule in 1853. Portuguese law and custom treated them as members of the House of Braganza, though they were still Saxe-Coburg and Gotha dynasts. This has led some to classify these last four monarchs of Portugal as members of a new royal family, called the House of Braganza-Saxe-Coburg and Gotha (Casa de Bragança-Saxe-Coburgo e Gota), though this view is not widely held.

After the demise of the Portuguese monarchy in the 1910 revolution, monarchists launched a counter-revolution known as the Monarchy of the North, in 1919; the attempted restoration only lasted a month.

| Name | Lifespan | Reign start | Reign end | Notes | Family | Image |
|---|---|---|---|---|---|---|
| John IV: The Restorer; The Fortunate; The Musician King; Portuguese: João IV | 19 March 1604 – 6 November 1656 (aged 52) | 1 December 1640 | 6 November 1656 | Was chosen as king through Acclamation (unanimous consent) by the Portuguese people. Later, by right of conquest, dethroned the King Philip III. Was also great-great-grandson of Manuel I | Braganza | |
| Afonso VI: The Victorious | 21 August 1643 – 12 September 1683 (aged 40) | 6 November 1656 | 12 September 1683 | Son of John IV | Braganza | |
| Peter II: The Pacific; Portuguese: Pedro II | 26 April 1648 – 9 December 1706 (aged 58) | 6 November 1683 | 9 December 1706 | Son of John IV; Brother of Afonso VI | Braganza | |
| John V: The Magnanimous; The Magnificent; The Generous; The Most Faithful King; The Nuns' Lover; The Portuguese Sun-King; Portuguese: João V | 22 October 1689 – 31 July 1750 (aged 60) | 9 December 1706 | 31 July 1750 | Son of Peter II | Braganza | |
| Joseph I: The Reformer; Portuguese: José I | 6 June 1714 – 24 February 1777 (aged 62) | 31 July 1750 | 24 February 1777 | Son of John V | Braganza | |
| Maria I: The Pious; The Mad | 17 December 1734 – 20 March 1816 (aged 81) | 24 February 1777 | 20 March 1816 | Daughter of Joseph I | Braganza | |
| Peter III: The Capacidónio; The Builder; The Edifier; The Sacristan; The Enabler; Portuguese: Pedro III | 5 July 1717 – 25 May 1786 (aged 68) | 24 February 1777 | 25 May 1786 | Husband of Maria I Son of John V jure uxoris king | Braganza | |
| John VI: The Clement; The Merciful; Portuguese: João VI | 13 May 1767 – 10 March 1826 (aged 58) | 20 March 1816 | 10 March 1826 | Son of Maria I and Peter III | Braganza | |
| Peter IV: The Soldier King; The Liberator; The Emperor; The Hero of Two Worlds; Portuguese: Pedro IV | 12 October 1798 – 24 September 1834 (aged 35) | 10 March 1826 | 2 May 1826 | Son of John VI | Braganza | |
| Maria II (1st reign): The Educator; The Good Mother | 4 April 1819 – 15 November 1853 (aged 34) | 2 May 1826 | 23 June 1828 | Daughter of Peter IV | Braganza | |
| Miguel I: The Absolutist; The Traditionalist; The Usurper | 26 October 1802 – 14 November 1866 (aged 64) | 26 February 1828 | 6 May 1834 | Son of John VI | Braganza | |
| Maria II (2nd reign): The Educator; The Good Mother | 4 April 1819 – 15 November 1853 (aged 34) | 26 May 1834 | 15 November 1853 | Daughter of Peter IV | Braganza | |
| Ferdinand II: The Artist King; Portuguese: Fernando II | 29 October 1816 – 15 December 1885 (aged 69) | 16 September 1837 | 15 November 1853 | Husband of Maria II jure uxoris king | Saxe-Coburg-Gotha-Koháry | |
| Peter V: The Hopeful; The Beloved; The Well-Beloved; Portuguese: Pedro V | 16 September 1837 – 11 November 1861 (aged 24) | 15 November 1853 | 11 November 1861 | Son of Maria II and Ferdinand II | Braganza (Note: Only officially, agnatically a member of the House of Saxe-Coburg and Gotha-Koháry, an arrangement sometimes referred to as the House of Braganza-Saxe-Coburg and Gotha. "While remaining patrilineal dynasts of the Duchy of Saxe-Coburg and Gotha according to pp. 88, 116 of the 1944 Almanach de Gotha, Title 1, Chapter 1, Article 5 of the 1838 Portuguese constitution declared, with respect to Ferdinand II of Portugal's issue by his first wife, that 'the Most Serene House of Braganza is the reigning house of Portugal and continues through the Person of the Lady Queen Maria II'. Thus their mutual descendants constitute the Coburg line of the House of Braganza") | |
| Luís I: The Popular; The Musician King; The Painter King | 31 October 1838 – 19 October 1889 (aged 50) | 11 November 1861 | 19 October 1889 | Son of Maria II and Ferdinand II; Brother of Peter V | Braganza | |
| Carlos I: The Diplomat; The Martyr; The Martyred; The Oceanographer; The Hunter; The Painter King; The Obese | 28 September 1863 – 1 February 1908 (aged 44) | 19 October 1889 | 1 February 1908 | Son of Luís I | Braganza | |
| Manuel II: The Patriot; The Sorrowful; The Unfortunate; The Studious; The Scholar; The Erudite; The Learned; The Bibliophile; The Missed-King | 15 November 1889 – 2 July 1932 (aged 42) | 1 February 1908 | 5 October 1910 | Son of Carlos I Last King of Portugal | Braganza | |

== Later pretenders ==
Manuel II died in 1932 without issue and without any close legitimate relatives, which left a succession crisis in the monarchist movement. Since then, various pretenders descended from previous monarchs have claimed to be the legitimate heir to the Portuguese throne. These groups are:

- Miguelist pretenders: Descendents of Miguel I, who was permanently banned from the line of succession by the Cortes in 1834. Following his exile, Miguel I, and later his descendents, have claimed that the Portuguese throne was rightfully theirs since his defeat in the Liberal Wars. After the fall of the Monarchy in 1910, the Miguelist pretenders attempted to have Manuel II name them their successors, which was refused by the former King. Despite that, in 1932, Duarte Nuno de Bragança, Miguel I's grandson, was acclaimed as the rightfull pretender to the throne by some sectors of the monarchist movement. The banishment of the Miguelists from the line of succession was revoked in 1950 by the National Assembly. Duarte Nuno's son, Duarte Pio, is the current and most recognized pretender to the throne.
- Descendents of Maria Pia de Saxe-Coburgo e Bragança: Maria Pia, allegedly an illegitimate daughter of King Carlos I, claimed to be his successor to the Portuguese throne after her half-brother's death. Maria Pia, who received some support from monarchist opposed to the Estado Novo, later adopted an Italian businessman, Rosario Poidimani, and abdicated in his favour. Poidimani continues to claim the Portuguese throne, but after Maria Pia's death in 1995 this line has lost most of its supporters.
- Loulé pretenders: Descendents of Ana de Jesus Maria of Braganza, daughter of King John VI, who married the 1st Duke of Loulé. The Loulé pretenders are supported by the People's Monarchist Party and the current pretender is Pedro José Folque de Mendoça Rolim de Moura Barreto, 6th Duke of Loulé.
- Descendents of Antónia of Braganza: Antónia of Braganza, daughter of Queen Maria II, did not abdicate for her rights to the Portuguese throne after marrying Leopold, Prince of Hohenzollern, being one of the only three people in the line of succession in 1910, as she died in 1913. Despite that, all of her descendents are foreigners, and as such are excluded from the line of succession.

== Length of reign ==
| Name | Reign | Duration |
|---|---|---|
| Afonso I | 25 July 1139 – 6 December 1185 | 46 years 4 months 11 days |
| Sancho I | 6 December 1185 – 26 March 1211 | 25 years 3 months 20 days |
| Afonso II | 26 March 1211 – 25 March 1223 | 11 years 11 months 27 days |
| Sancho II | 25 March 1223 – 4 December 1247 | 24 years 8 months 9 days |
| Afonso III | 4 January 1248 – 16 February 1279 | 31 years 1 month 12 days |
| Denis I | 6 February 1279 – 7 January 1325 | 45 years 11 months 1 day |
| Afonso IV | 7 January 1325 – 28 May 1357 | 32 years 4 months 21 days |
| Peter I | 28 May 1357 – 18 January 1367 | 9 years 7 months 21 days |
| Ferdinand I | 18 January 1367 – 22 October 1383 | 16 years 9 months 4 days |
| John I | 6 April 1385 – 14 August 1433 | 48 years 4 months 8 days |
| Edward | 14 August 1433 – 9 September 1438 | 5 years 26 days |
| Afonso V | 13 September 1438 – 11 November 1477, 15 November 1477 – 28 August 1481 | 42 years 11 months 11 days 1st: (39 years 1 month 29 days), 2nd: (3 years 9 months 13 days) |
| John II | 11 November 1477 – 15 November 1477, 28 August 1481 – 25 October 1495 | 14 years 2 months 1 day 1st: (4 days), 2nd: (14 years 1 month 27 days) |
| Manuel I | 25 October 1495 – 13 December 1521 | 26 years 1 month 18 days |
| John III | 13 December 1521 – 11 June 1557 | 35 years 5 months 29 days |
| Sebastian I | 11 June 1557 – 4 August 1578 | 21 years 1 month 24 days |
| Henry I | 4 August 1578 – 31 January 1580 | 1 year 5 months 27 days |
| Philip I | 12 September 1580 – 13 September 1598 | 18 years 1 day |
| Philip II | 13 September 1598 – 31 March 1621 | 22 years 6 months 18 days |
| Philip III | 31 March 1621 – 1 December 1640 | 19 years 8 months 1 day |
| John IV | 1 December 1640 – 6 November 1656 | 15 years 11 months 5 days |
| Afonso VI | 6 November 1656 – 12 September 1683 | 26 years 10 months 6 days |
| Peter II | 12 September 1683 – 9 December 1706 | 23 years 2 months 27 days |
| John V | 9 December 1706 – 31 July 1750 | 43 years 7 months 22 days |
| Joseph I | 31 July 1750 – 24 February 1777 | 26 years 6 months 24 days |
| Maria I | 24 February 1777 – 20 March 1816 | 39 years 25 days |
| Peter III | 24 February 1777 – 25 May 1786 | 9 years 3 months 1 day |
| John VI | 20 March 1816 – 10 March 1826 | 9 years 11 months 18 days |
| Peter IV | 10 March 1826 – 2 May 1826 | 1 month 22 days |
| Maria II | 2 May 1826 – 23 June 1828, 26 May 1834 – 15 November 1853 | 21 years 7 months 10 days 1st: (2 years 1 month 21 days), 2nd: (19 years 5 months 20 days) |
| Miguel I | 11 July 1828 – 26 May 1834 | 5 years 10 months 15 days |
| Ferdinand II | 16 September 1837 – 15 November 1853 | 16 years 1 month 30 days |
| Peter V | 15 November 1853 – 11 November 1861 | 7 years 11 months 27 days |
| Luís I | 11 November 1861 – 19 October 1889 | 27 years 11 months 8 days |
| Carlos I | 19 October 1889 – 1 February 1908 | 18 years 3 months 13 days |
| Manuel II | 1 February 1908 – 5 October 1910 | 2 years 8 months 4 days |

== See also ==
- List of Portuguese royal consorts
- List of viceroys of Portugal
- List of titles and honours of the Portuguese Crown
- Style of the Portuguese sovereign
- List of monarchs of Brazil
- Families
  - Family tree of Portuguese monarchs
  - Descendants of John VI of Portugal
  - Descendants of Manuel I of Portugal
  - Descendants of Miguel I of Portugal
