= Taifa of Molina =

Medieval Islamic taifa kingdom

- 1080s–1100
- Capital: Molina
- Common languages: Arabic, Mozarabic
- Religion: Islam, Roman Catholicism, Judaism
- Government: Monarchy
- Historical era: Middle Ages
  - Established: 1080s
  - Conquered by the Kingdom of Aragon: 1100
- Currency: Dirham and Dinar
| Preceded by | Succeeded by |
| Taifa of Valencia | Kingdom of Aragon |

The Taifa of Molina (Arabic: طائفة ملينة) was a medieval Islamic taifa kingdom that existed from around the 1080s to 1100. The Taifa was ruled by the Arab tribe of Banu Khazraj which had its origin in the Hejaz region of Arabia. It was centred in the present day region of Molina de Aragón in northern Spain.

== List of Emirs ==
=== Galbunid dynasty ===
- (To Valencia: 1075–?)
- 'Azzun: ?–1100

== See also ==
- List of Sunni Muslim dynasties
- Castle of Molina de Aragón
