= Cubillejo del Sitio =

District in Guadalajara, Spain

Coordinates: 40°53′N 1°48′W

Cubijello del Sitio is a district in the Spanish municipality of Molina de Aragon of the province of Guadalajara.

== Description ==
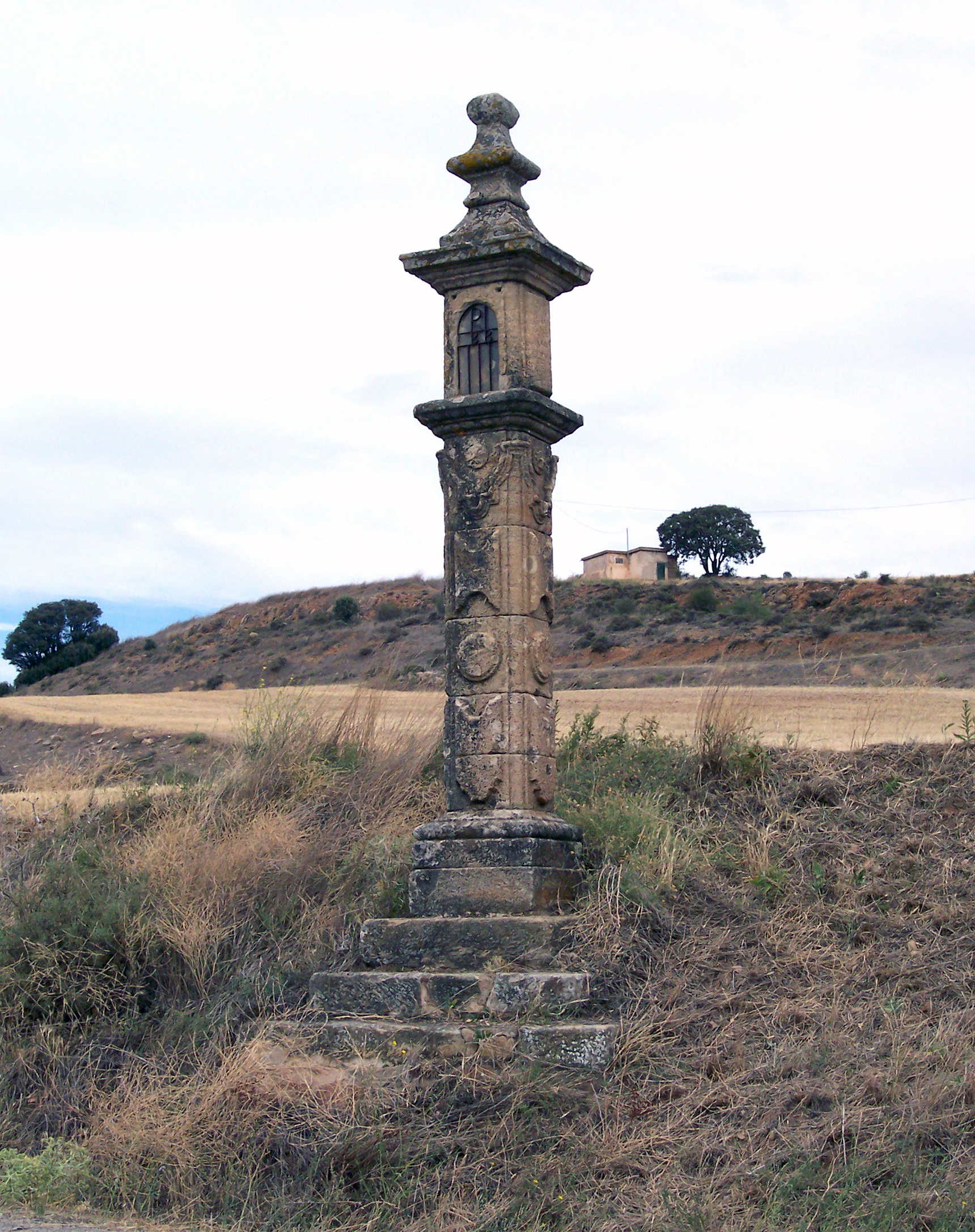
Pairón de San Juan Bautista

The town belongs to the Guadalaran province of the Molina de Aragon, which itself belongs to the autonomous community of Castilla-La Mancha. The town has a population of 11 people. It was once referred to as "Cubillejo del Sicio".

== Monuments ==
- Pairón de San Juan Bautista, a 17th-century work, of which a reproduction now exists in the barrio de Salamanca of Madrid.
- Fuente de 1932.
- Iglesia de San Ildefonso, a 16th-century Church.
