= Castle of Molina de Aragón =

Fortress in Spain

- Castillo de Molina de Aragón (Spanish)
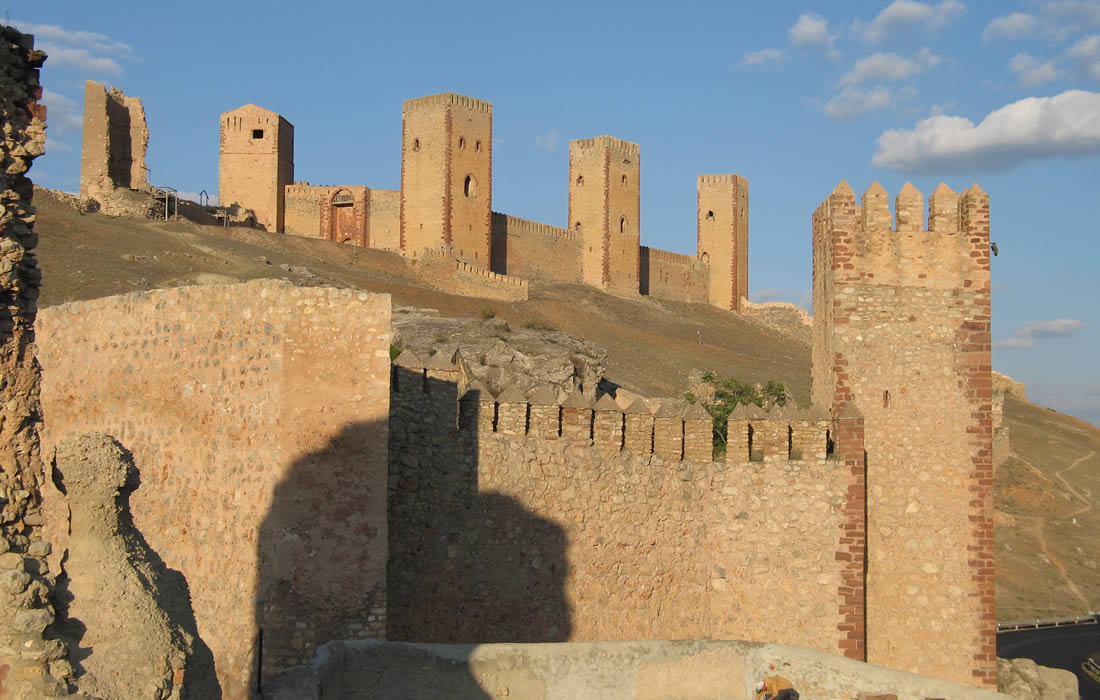

- Location within Spain
- 40.846111°N 1.886389°W
- Location: Molina de Aragón, Spain

Spanish Cultural Heritage
- Official name: Castillo de Molina de Aragón
- Type: Non-movable
- Criteria: Monument
- Designated: 1931
- Reference no.: RI-51-0000614

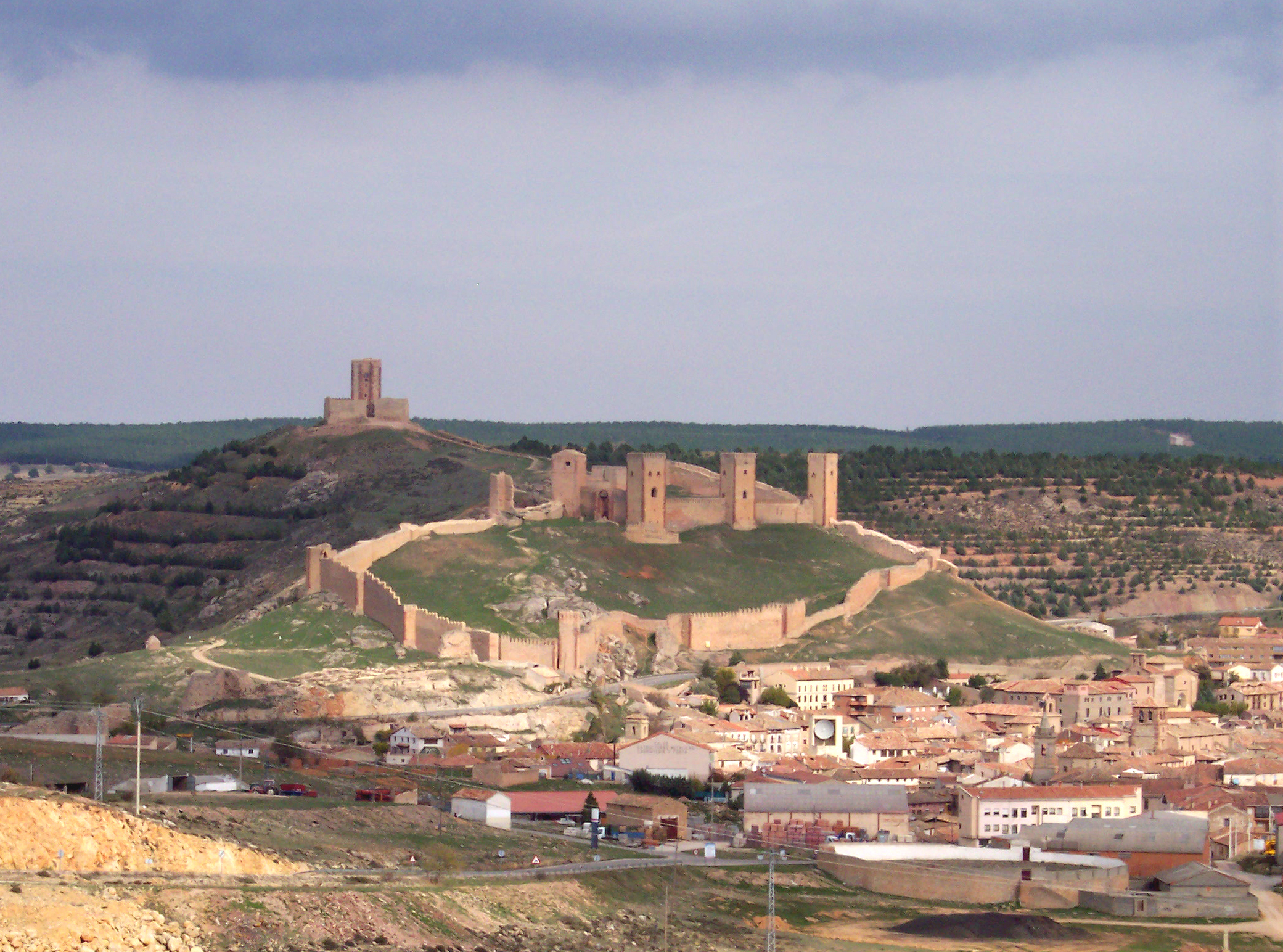
Castle of Molina de Aragón.

The Castle of Molina de Aragón (also called alcázar or alcazaba) is a fortification in Molina de Aragón, Castile-La Mancha, Spain. It was declared Bien de Interés Cultural in 1931.

It is located on a hill commanding the surrounding valley, and is formed by an external line of walls with four gates and numerous towers, which defends the internal fortress. The latter has six towers, of which four are currently in good conditions. Originally, the line of towers included a village. It originated as a Moorish fortress (10th-11th century), built over a pre-existing Celtiberian castle. The fortress was used as residence of the lords of the taifa of Molina. El Cid resided here when he was exiled from Castile. In 1129 it was conquered from the Moors by Alfonso I of Aragon, who gave it the Lara family.

== Sources ==
- Castillos de España. León: Editorial Everest. 1997.
