= La Yunta =

La Yunta, Spain
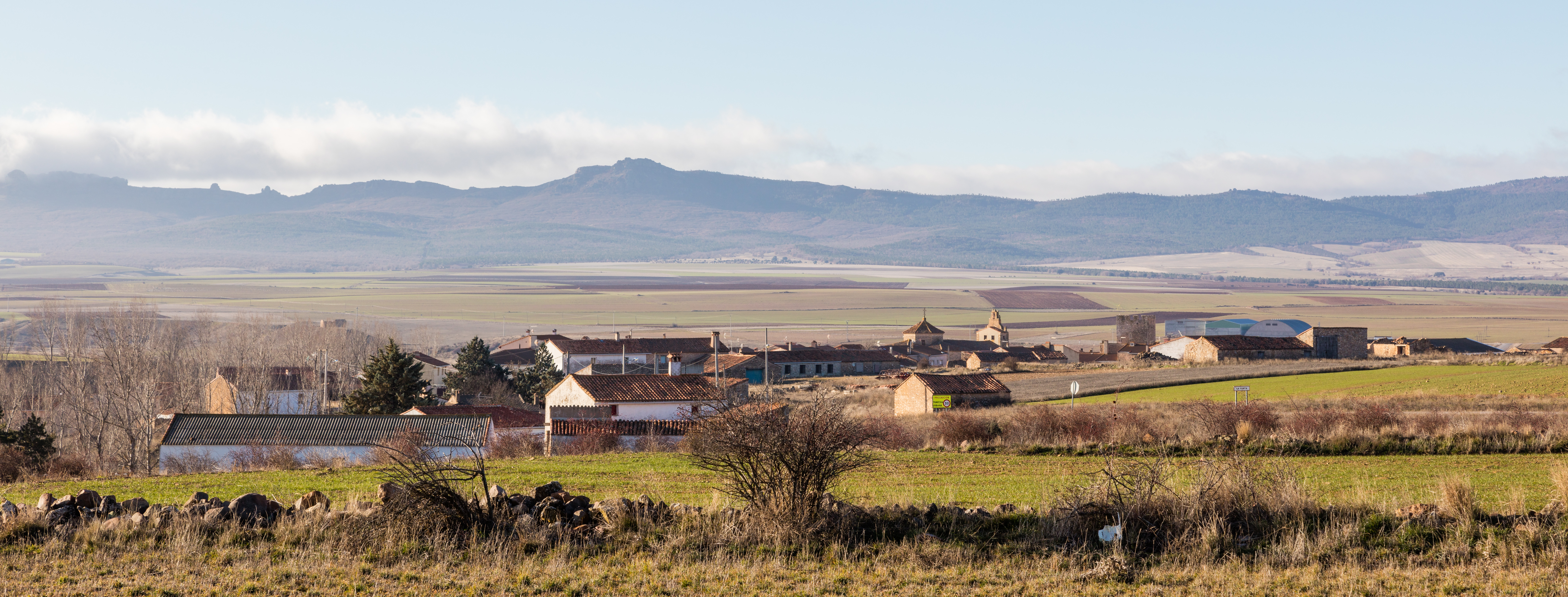

- Location within Province of Guadalajara Location within Castilla-La Mancha Location within Spain
- Coordinates: 40°54′57″N 1°40′58″W
- Country: Spain
- Autonomous community: Castile-La Mancha
- Province: Guadalajara
- Municipality: La Yunta

Area
  - Total: 55 km^{2} (21 sq mi)

Population (2025-01-01)
  - Total: 86
  - Density: 1.6/km^{2} (4.0/sq mi)
- Time zone: UTC+1 (CET)
  - Summer (DST): UTC+2 (CEST)

La Yunta is a municipality located in the province of Guadalajara, Castile-La Mancha, Spain. According to the 2022 census (INE), the municipality has a population of 90 inhabitants.
