= Pico del Águila (La Alcarria) =

Mountain in Spain

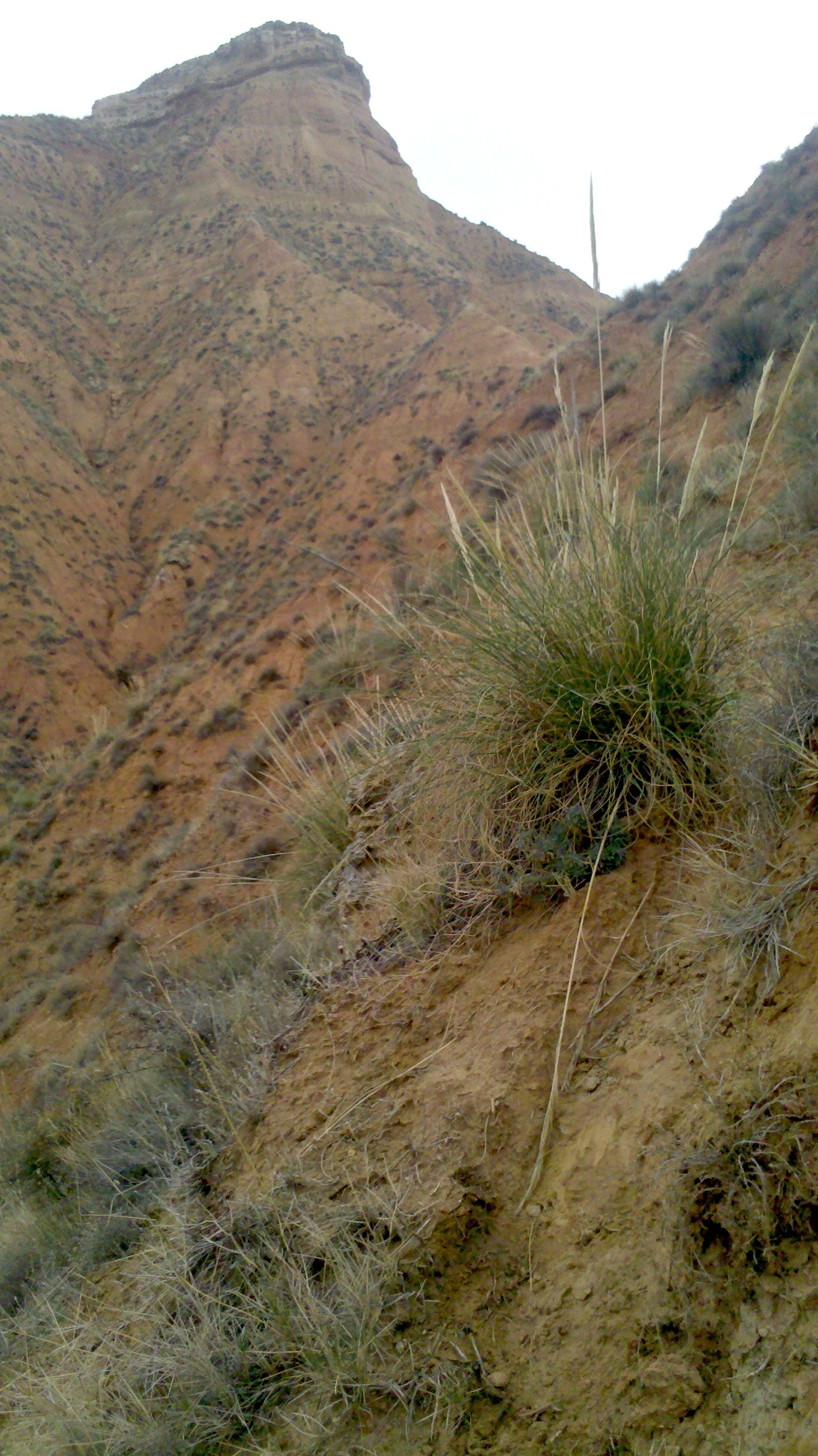
- Looking up from the foot of the drop at the northern end

Highest point
- Elevation: 970 m (3,180 ft)
- Coordinates: 40°39′19″N 3°06′23″W

Geography
- Location: Guadalajara

Pico del Águila (en: Beak of the Eagle) is a tabular mountain at the limits of the Alcarria altiplano, or high plain. It lies in the Spanish province of Guadalajara with a prominent drop of about 200 m at its northern side.

Access is provided by dirt tracks from the east, north and west side.
