= Molina de Aragón =

Molina de Aragón, Spain
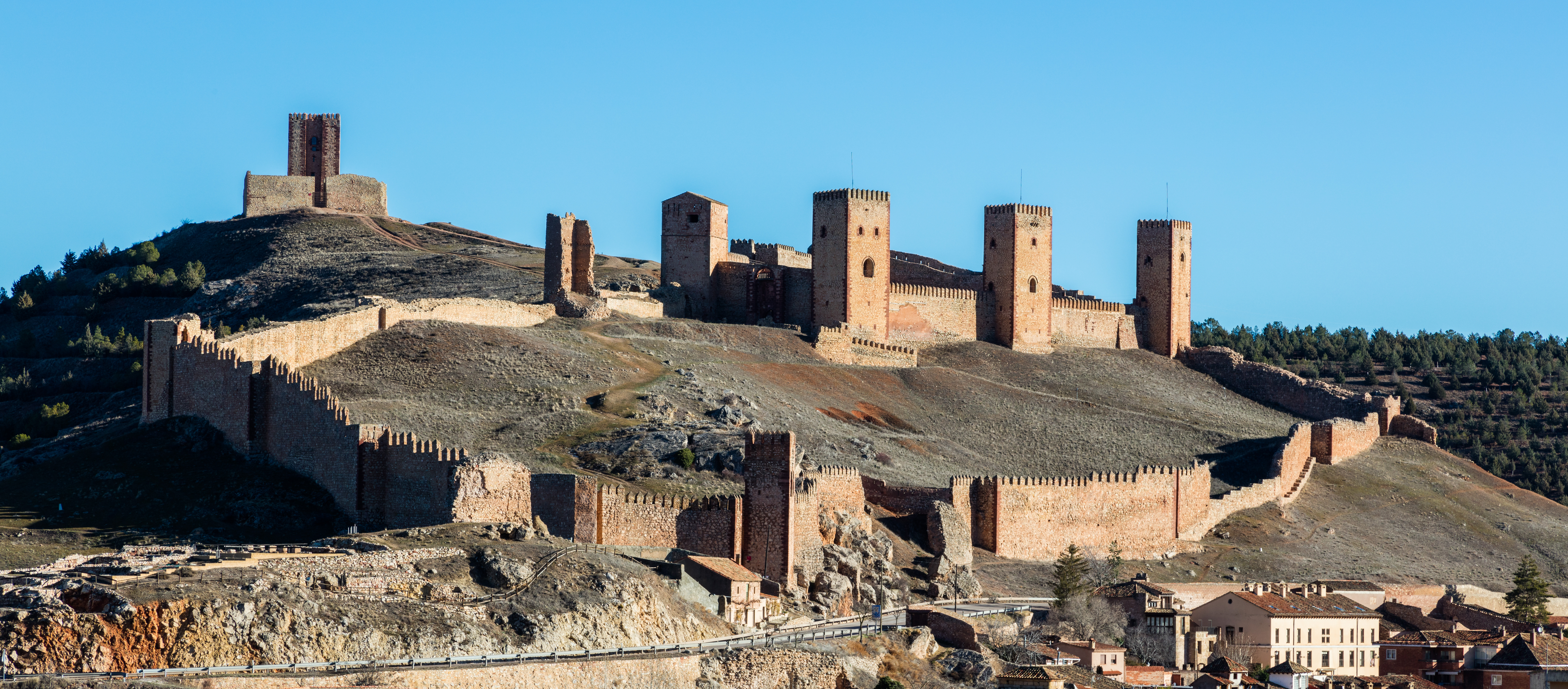

- Flag Coat of arms

- Location in the Province of Guadalajara Location in Castile-La Mancha Location in Spain.
- Coordinates: 40°50′46″N 1°53′11″W
- Country: Spain
- Autonomous community: Castile-La Mancha
- Province: Guadalajara
- Comarca: Señorío de Molina-Alto Tajo

Government
  - Mayor: David Pascual Herrera

Area
  - Total: 168.33 km^{2} (64.99 sq mi)
- Elevation: 1,065 m (3,494 ft)

Population (2025-01-01)
  - Total: 3,281
  - Density: 19.49/km^{2} (50.48/sq mi)
- Time zone: UTC+1 (CET)
  - Summer (DST): UTC+2 (CEST)
- Postal code: 19300
- Website: Official website

Molina de Aragón is a municipality located in the province of Guadalajara, Castile-La Mancha, Spain. According to the 2009 census (INE), the municipality had a population of 3,671 inhabitants. It held the record (−28.2 °C) for the lowest temperature measured by a meteorological station in Spain, and now it is in third place.

It was the seat of the taifa of Molina, a Moorish independent state, before it was reconquered by the Christians of Alfonso I of Aragon in 1129. On 21 April 1154 Manrique Pérez de Lara issued a sweeping fuero to the town of Molina, which he was building into a semi-independent fief. He and his descendants claimed to rule Molina Dei gratia ("by the grace of God"). Molina is also the type location of the carbonate mineral aragonite.

== History ==
During the Caliphate of Córdoba, the area appears to have been very sparsely populated. According to Ramón Menéndez Pidal, its inhabitants were primarily Arabized Berbers. After the disintegration of the Caliphate, a small taifa kingdom emerged there, mentioned in the epic Cantar de mio Cid. During the Reconquista, it was captured in 1128 by Alfonso the Battler, king of Aragon. His brother Ramiro II who succeeded him chose to cede to Castile the lands corresponding to the lordship of Molina. The region was therefore resettled by the Crown of Castile, as it lay west of the Iberian System; it later returned to Muslim control, specifically to that of the Almoravids.

Around 1139, the lands were retaken by Manrique Pérez de Lara, and the area was established as an independent lordship. Consequently, Manrique Pérez de Lara became the first Lord of Molina, and Molina remained an independent lordship, separate from the Crowns of Aragon and Castile, for more than a century and a half, receiving its own fuero. The Lordship of Molina comprised not only the town of Molina de Aragón but also four additional sexmas: the Sexma del Campo, Sexma del Sabinar, Sexma del Pedregal, and Sexma de la Sierra.

Henry II of Castile (r. 1366–1367, 1369–1379) granted Molina to his lieutenant Bertrand du Guesclin. However, due to the war between Castile and Aragon, the people of Molina rebelled and chose to place themselves under Aragonese sovereignty in 1366. This process was completed three years later with the acceptance of the Aragonese king. From this period of Aragonese rule comes the town's current name, previously known as Molina de los Caballeros. It finally returned to Castilian hands in 1375, when the lordship was given as part of the marriage dowry of Eleanor, an Aragonese infanta, upon her marriage to the Infante John of Castile. In the Middle Ages, Molina was also home to a Jewish community. Remains of a medieval synagogue still survive in the town.

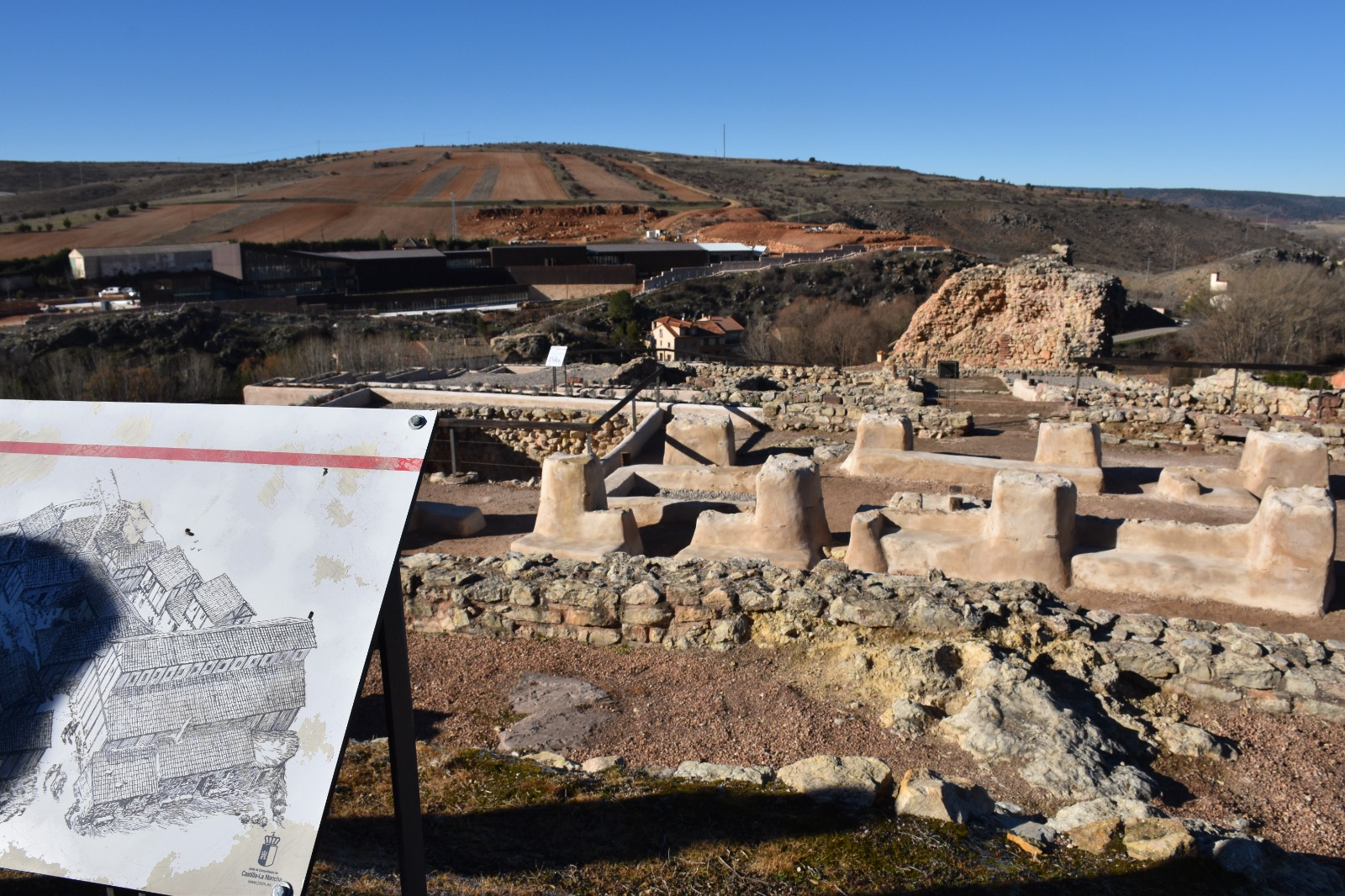
Archaeological site "Prao de los Judíos" ("Meadow of the Jews"

During the Peninsular War (1807–1814), the residents' resistance to Napoleonic troops led to the town being set on fire in retaliation. In recognition of their loyalty, the Cortes granted it the title of "Muy Noble y Muy Leal Ciudad" ("Very Noble and Very Loyal City"). By the mid-19th century, there were several proposals to demolish the town's castle. Around the same period, the town had a recorded population of 3,453 inhabitants. It is also described in the eleventh volume of Pascual Madoz’s Diccionario geográfico-estadístico-histórico de España y sus posesiones de Ultramar.

== Main sights ==
- Medieval alcazar (10th–11th centuries), the largest in the province
- Roman bridge (Puente Viejo)
- Convent of St. Francis
- Giraldo (St. Francis Church Bell Tower)
- Church of Santa Clara
- Church of Santa María de San Gil
- Molina-Alto Tajo Geopark, Molina de Aragon is within this Geopark.

== List of settlements in the municipality ==
- Anchuela del Pedregal
- Cubillejo de la Sierra
- Cubillejo del Sitio
- Novella
- Tordelpalo

== Climate ==
Molina de Aragón has a warm-summer mediterranean climate (Köppen climate classification: Csb) with some semi-arid influences. Precipitation is irregular throughout the year, with most rainfall occurring during spring and autumn. Winters are cold for Spanish standards, with temperatures often below 0 °C (32 °F) due to its altitude and its inland location. Summers are warm with mean maximum around 30 °C (86 °F) while the nights remain relatively cool.

Climate data for Molina de Aragón 1062m (1991–2020), extremes (1949-present)
Month	Jan	Feb	Mar	Apr	May	Jun	Jul	Aug	Sep	Oct	Nov	Dec	Year
Record high °C (°F)	21.4 (70.5)	26.8 (80.2)	26.8 (80.2)	29.6 (85.3)	33.2 (91.8)	37.8 (100.0)	38.0 (100.4)	38.0 (100.4)	36.4 (97.5)	30.0 (86.0)	23.6 (74.5)	19.2 (66.6)	38.0 (100.4)
Mean daily maximum °C (°F)	8.8 (47.8)	10.8 (51.4)	14.4 (57.9)	16.5 (61.7)	20.9 (69.6)	26.1 (79.0)	30.0 (86.0)	29.7 (85.5)	24.3 (75.7)	18.4 (65.1)	12.0 (53.6)	9.2 (48.6)	18.4 (65.2)
Daily mean °C (°F)	2.8 (37.0)	3.9 (39.0)	6.8 (44.2)	9.1 (48.4)	13.1 (55.6)	17.5 (63.5)	20.4 (68.7)	20.3 (68.5)	15.9 (60.6)	11.2 (52.2)	6.0 (42.8)	3.3 (37.9)	10.9 (51.5)
Mean daily minimum °C (°F)	−3.3 (26.1)	−3.0 (26.6)	−0.8 (30.6)	1.7 (35.1)	5.2 (41.4)	8.8 (47.8)	10.9 (51.6)	10.9 (51.6)	7.4 (45.3)	4.1 (39.4)	0.0 (32.0)	−2.6 (27.3)	3.3 (37.9)
Record low °C (°F)	−28.2 (−18.8)	−20.2 (−4.4)	−15.6 (3.9)	−8.6 (16.5)	−5.2 (22.6)	−1.8 (28.8)	1.0 (33.8)	0.0 (32.0)	−3.6 (25.5)	−6.4 (20.5)	−15.6 (3.9)	−28.0 (−18.4)	−28.2 (−18.8)
Average precipitation mm (inches)	27.5 (1.08)	24.2 (0.95)	36.6 (1.44)	49.7 (1.96)	59.7 (2.35)	44.9 (1.77)	18.0 (0.71)	23.8 (0.94)	42.6 (1.68)	46.1 (1.81)	39.1 (1.54)	30.9 (1.22)	443.1 (17.45)
Average precipitation days (≥ 1 mm)	5.7	5.2	6.9	8.8	8.7	6.1	2.8	3.0	4.7	7.5	6.9	5.9	72.2
Average snowy days	5.2	4.3	3.6	1.9	0.3	0	0	0	0	0.2	1.6	2.2	19.3
Average relative humidity (%)	74	67	63	62	58	53	47	48	57	67	73	76	62
Mean monthly sunshine hours	133	155	202	207	239	282	335	307	237	177	120	115	2,509
Source: Agencia Estatal de Meteorologia

== Notable persons ==
- Claro Abánades López (1879-1973), Carlist politician and publisher
- Romualdo de Toledo y Robles (1895-1974), Carlist politician and longtime high official of Ministry of Education
- José María Araúz de Robles Estremera (1898-1977), Carlist politician and bull-breeder

== Gallery ==
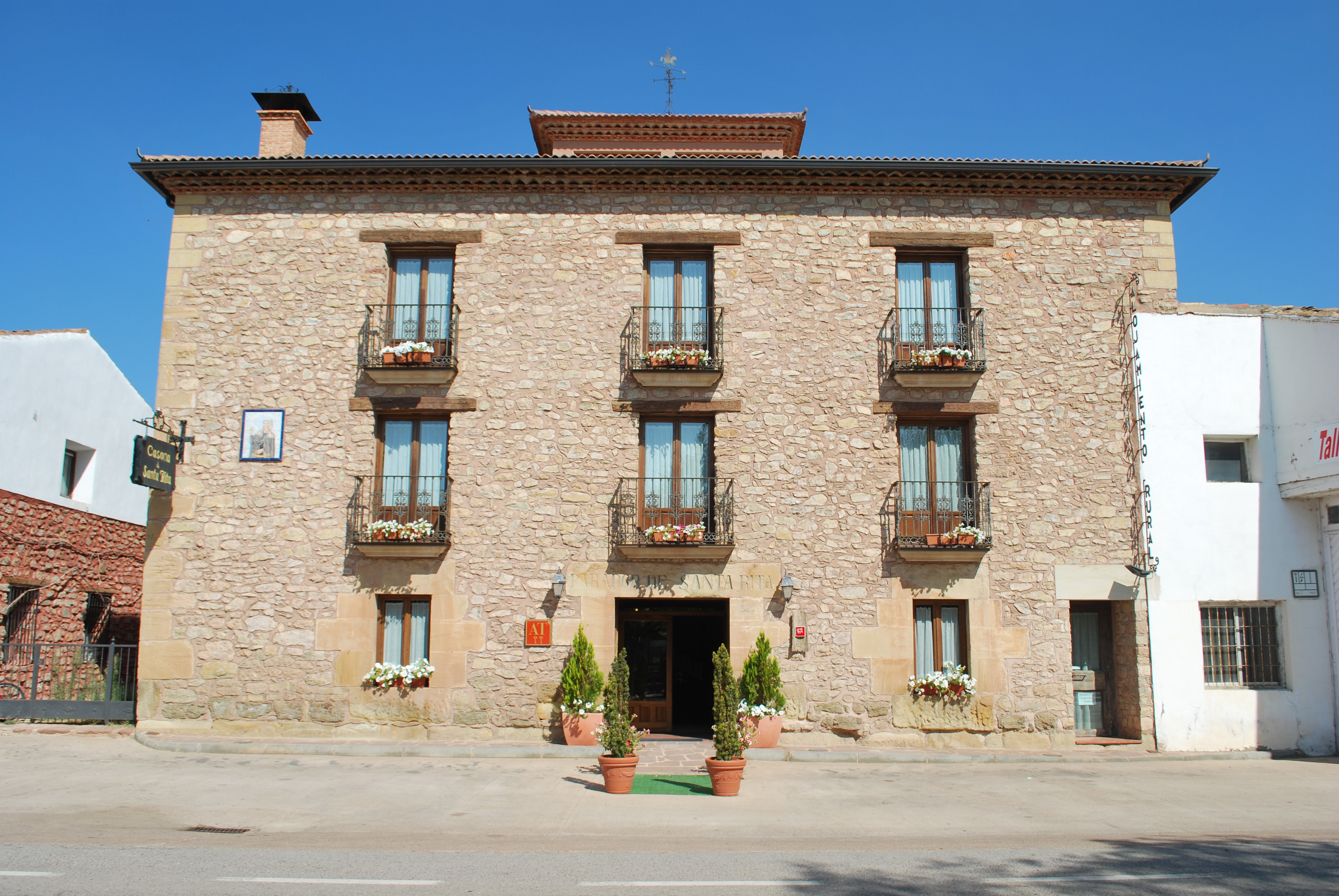
A typical inn (built 1826) at Molina de Aragón, Spain.

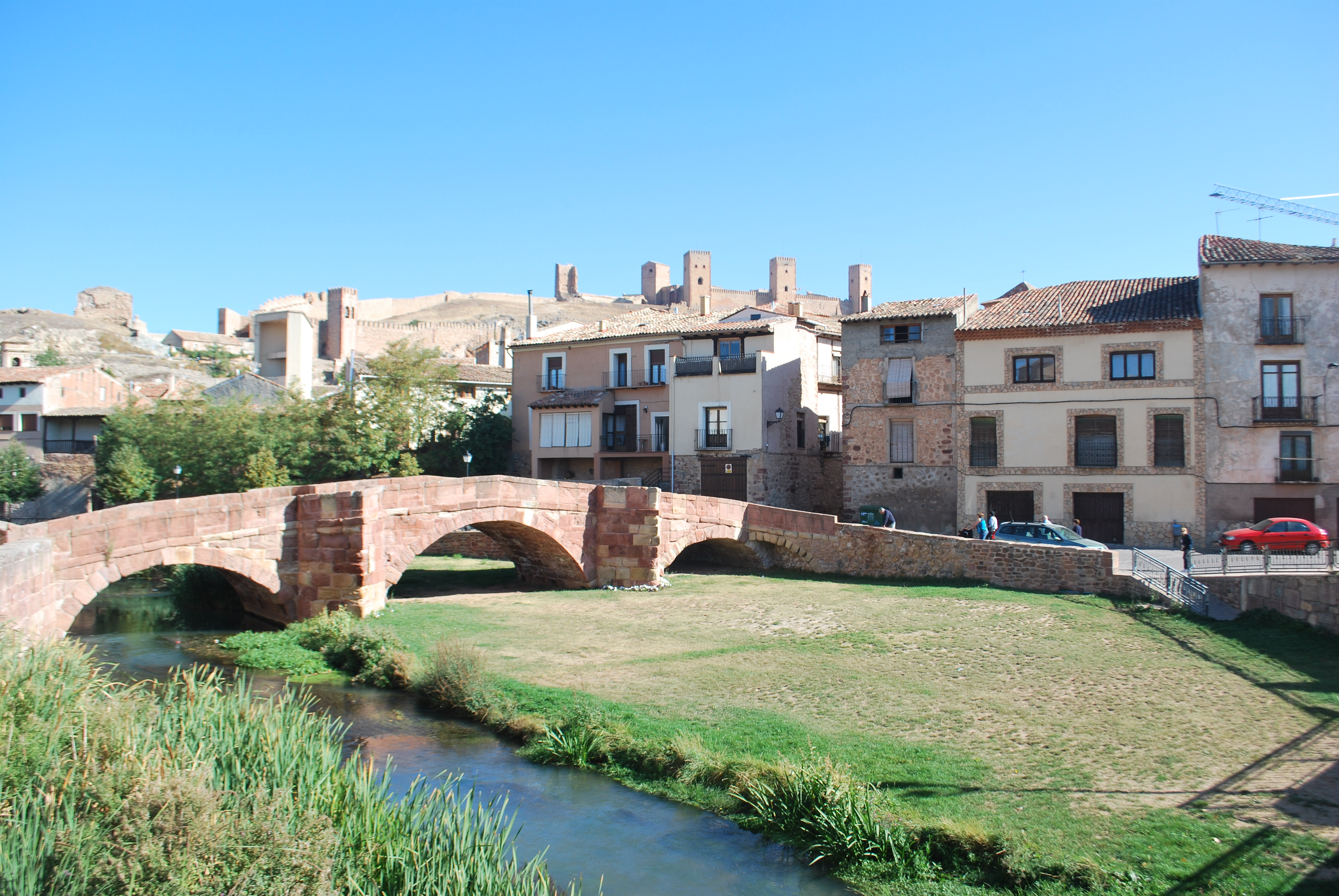
Old bridge over the Gallo river, 13th century, in the background the Medieval alcazar of Molina de Aragón, Spain.

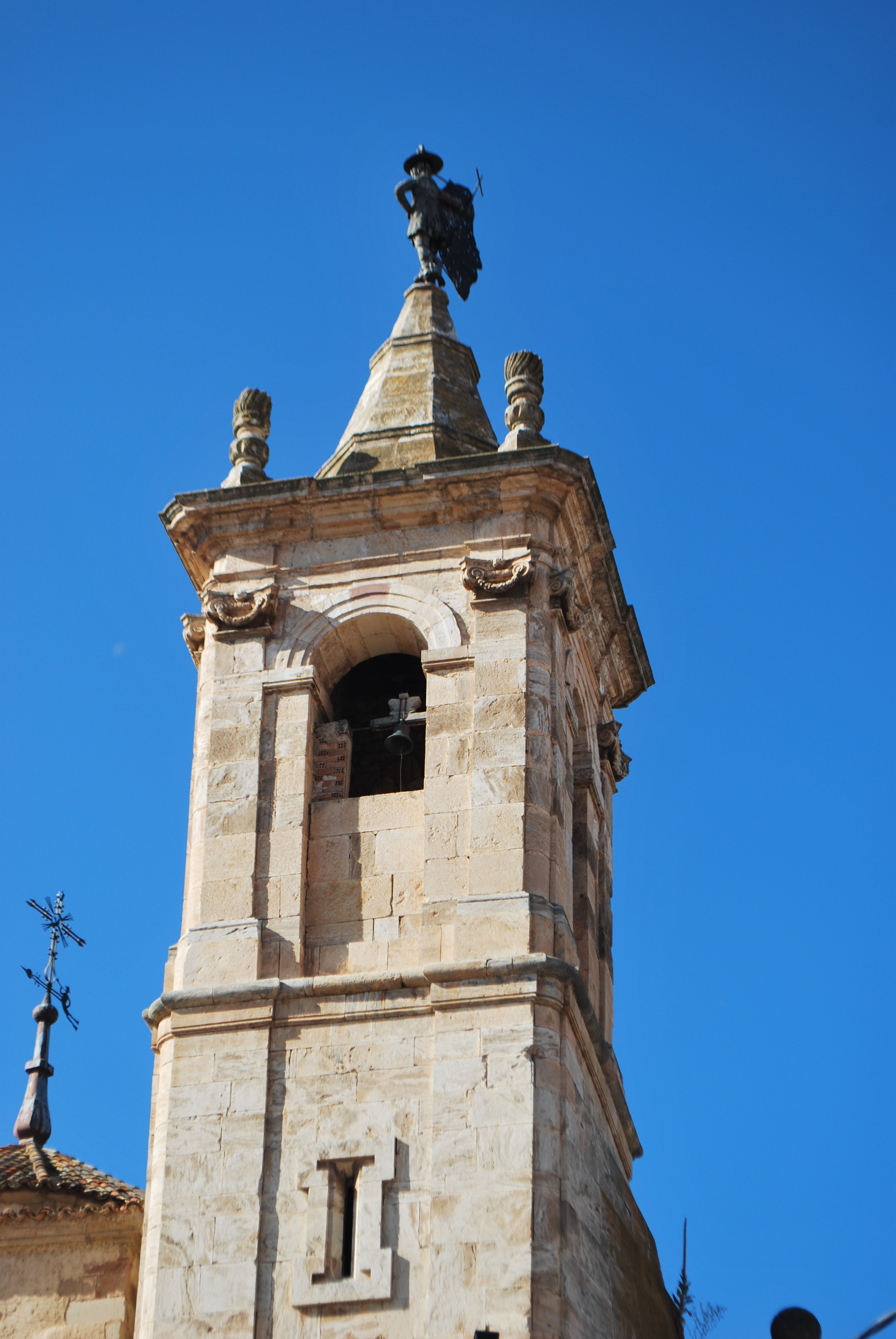
Giraldo on top of St. Francis Church bell Tower.

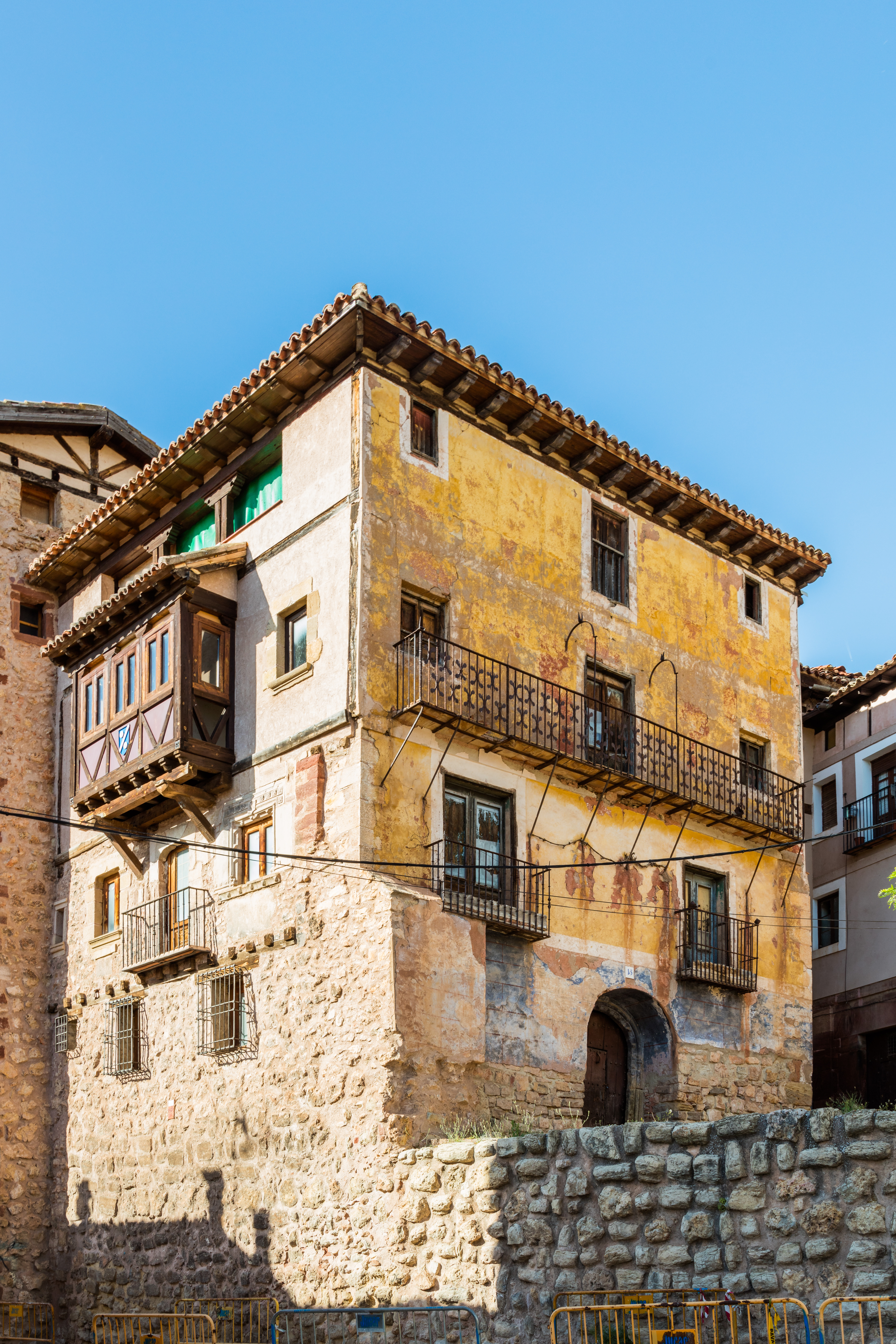
Posada de los Comuneros.

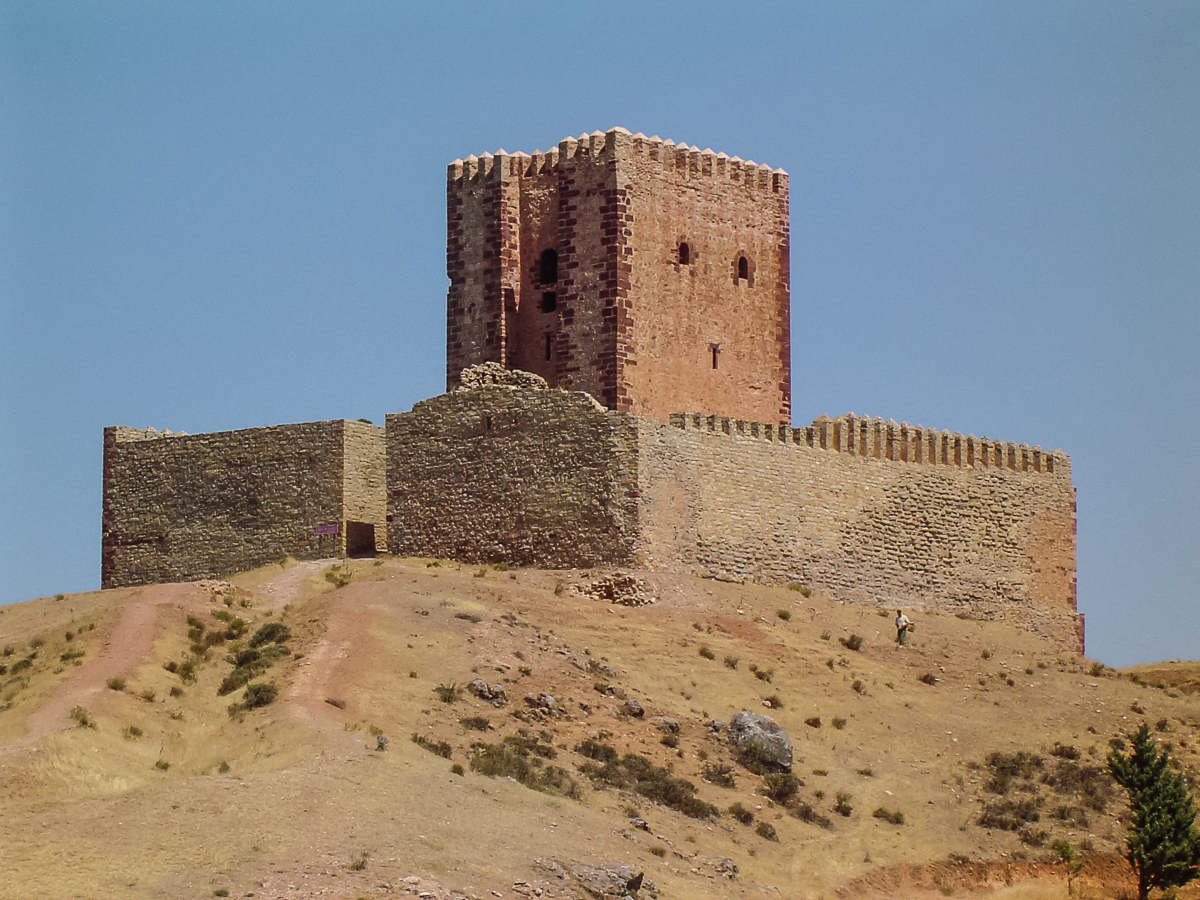
Tower of Aragon.
