= Tortuero =

Tortuero, Spain
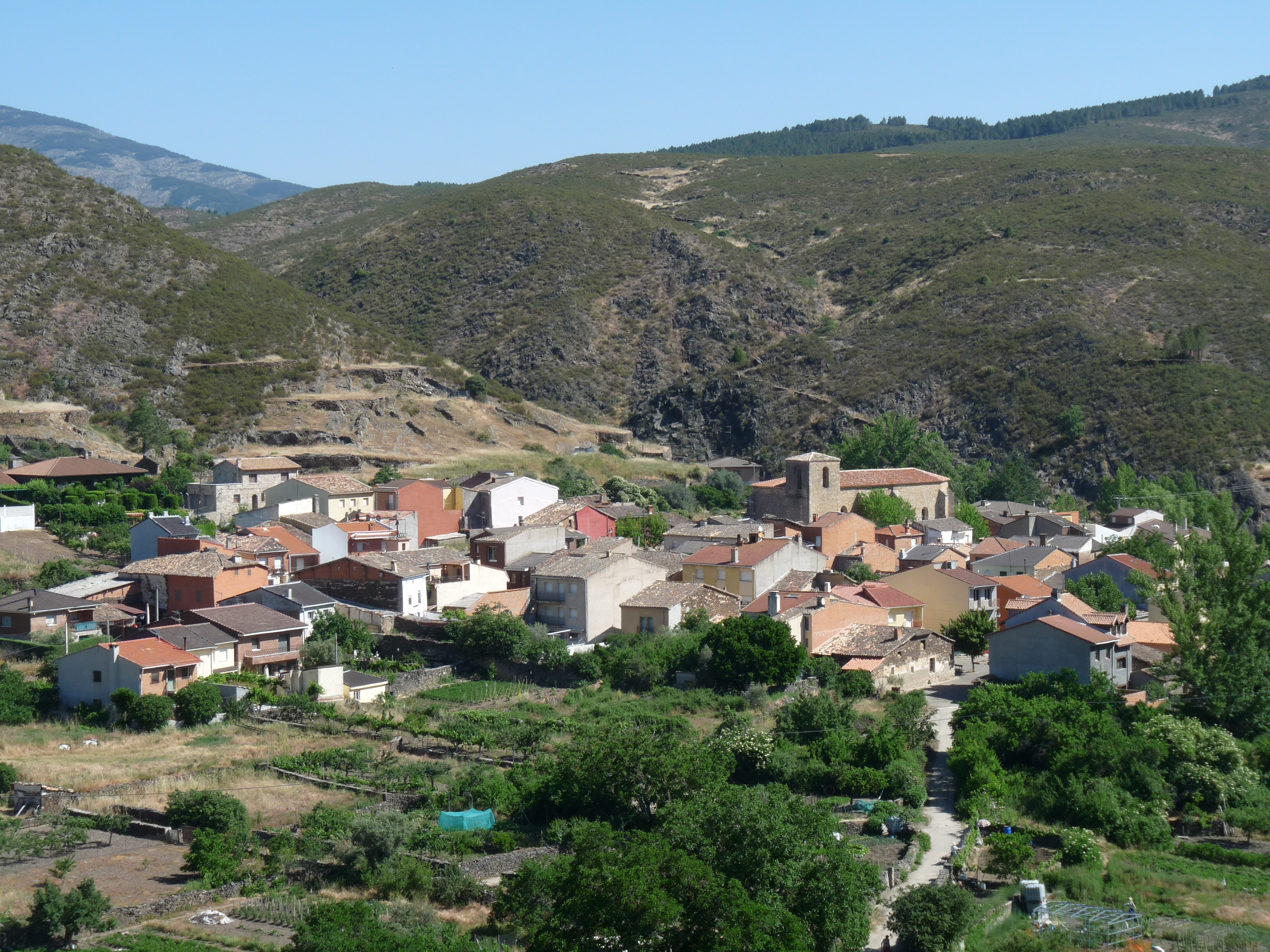

- Location within Province of Guadalajara Location within Castilla-La Mancha Location within Spain
- Coordinates: 40°56′15″N 3°21′08″W
- Country: Spain
- Autonomous community: Castile-La Mancha
- Province: Guadalajara
- Municipality: Tortuero

Area
  - Total: 46 km^{2} (18 sq mi)

Population (2025-01-01)
  - Total: 19
  - Density: 0.41/km^{2} (1.1/sq mi)
- Time zone: UTC+1 (CET)
  - Summer (DST): UTC+2 (CEST)

Tortuero is a municipality located in the province of Guadalajara, Castile-La Mancha, Spain. According to the 2004 census (INE), the municipality has a population of 35 inhabitants.
