= Miedes de Atienza =

Miedes de Atienza, Spain
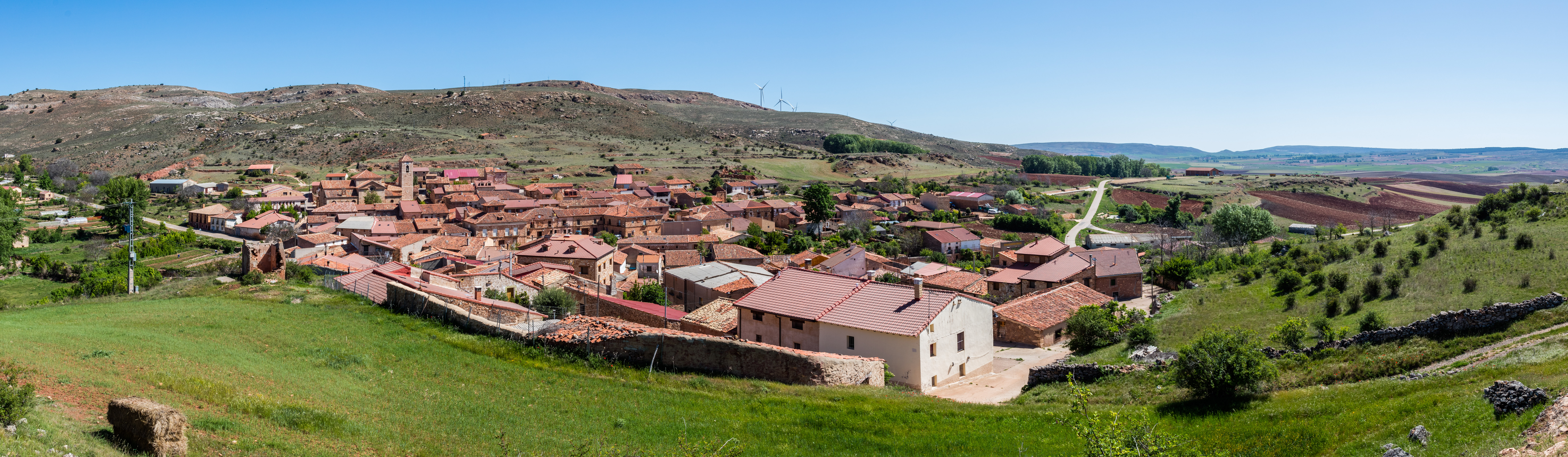

- Coat of arms

- Location within Province of Guadalajara Location within Castilla-La Mancha Location within Spain
- Coordinates: 41°16′05″N 2°57′45″W
- Country: Spain
- Autonomous community: Castile-La Mancha
- Province: Guadalajara
- Municipality: Miedes de Atienza

Area
  - Total: 42.99 km^{2} (16.60 sq mi)

Population (2025-01-01)
  - Total: 60
  - Density: 1.4/km^{2} (3.6/sq mi)
- Time zone: UTC+1 (CET)
  - Summer (DST): UTC+2 (CEST)

Miedes de Atienza is a municipality located in the province of Guadalajara, Castile-La Mancha, Spain. According to the 2023 census (INE), the municipality has a population of 58 inhabitants.
