= Valdepeñas de la Sierra =

Valdepeñas de la Sierra, Spain
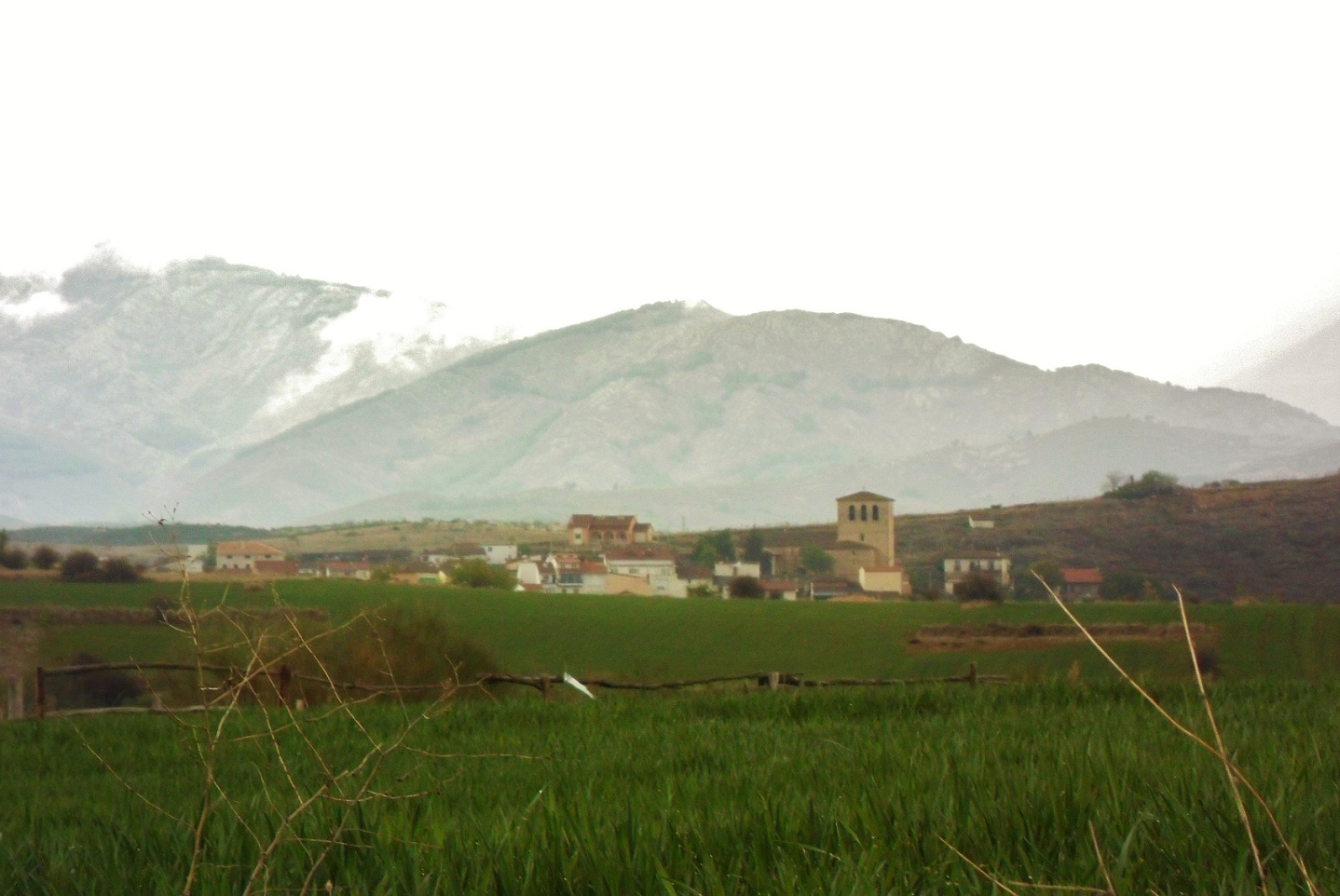
- View of Valdepeñas de la Sierra

- Coat of arms

- Location within Province of Guadalajara Location within Castilla-La Mancha Location within Spain
- Coordinates: 40°54′34″N 3°23′09″W
- Country: Spain
- Autonomous community: Castile-La Mancha
- Province: Guadalajara
- Municipality: Valdepeñas de la Sierra

Area
  - Total: 69 km^{2} (27 sq mi)

Population (2025-01-01)
  - Total: 151
  - Density: 2.2/km^{2} (5.7/sq mi)
- Time zone: UTC+1 (CET)
  - Summer (DST): UTC+2 (CEST)

Valdepeñas de la Sierra is a municipality located in the province of Guadalajara, Castile-La Mancha, Spain. According to the 2006 census (INE), the municipality has a population of 200 inhabitants.
