= Gascueña de Bornova =

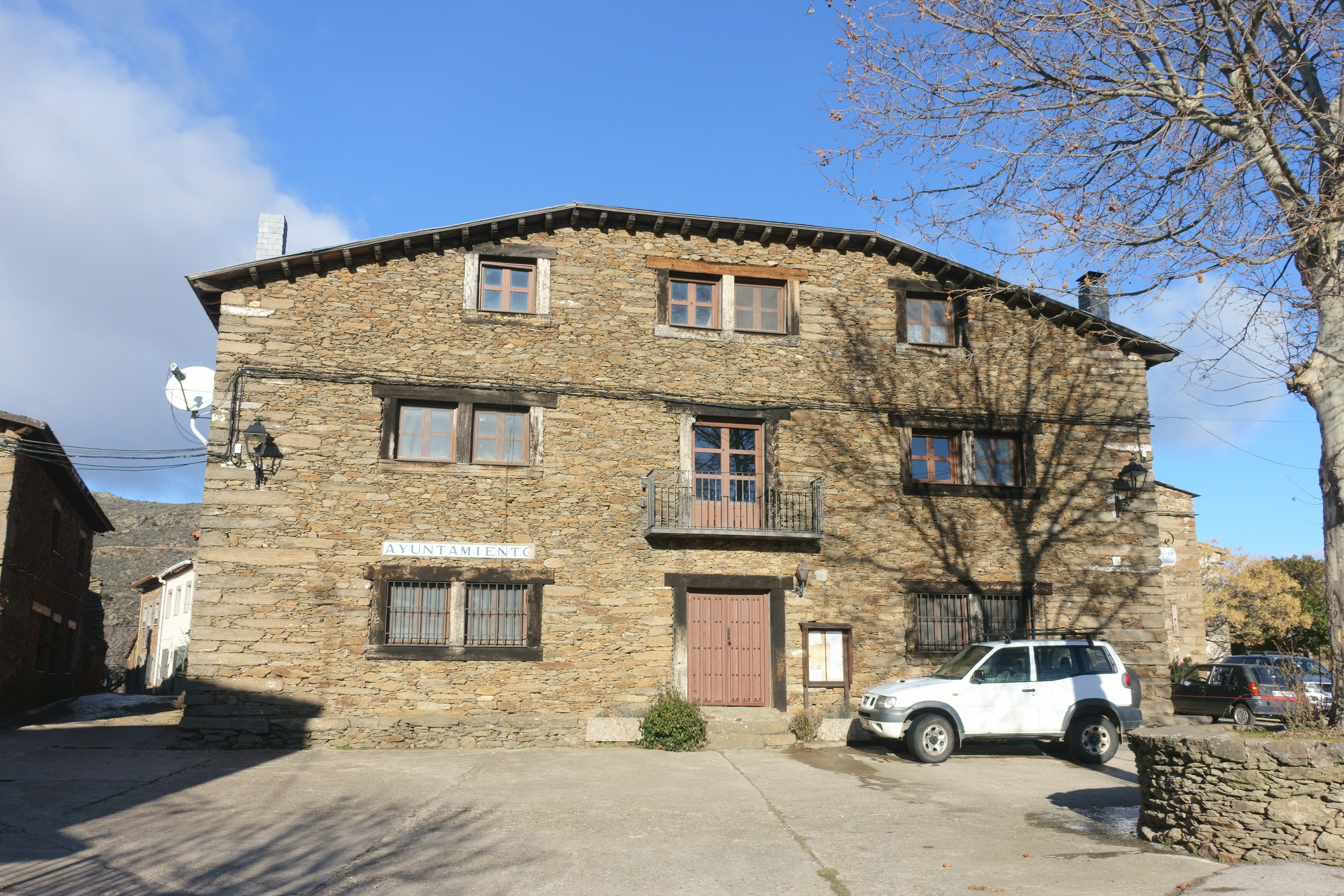
- Town hall

- Location within Province of Guadalajara Location within Castilla-La Mancha Location within Spain
- Country: Spain
- Autonomous community: Castile-La Mancha
- Province: Guadalajara
- Municipality: Gascueña de Bornova

Area
  - Total: 26 km^{2} (10 sq mi)

Population (2025-01-01)
  - Total: 22
  - Density: 0.85/km^{2} (2.2/sq mi)
- Time zone: UTC+1 (CET)
  - Summer (DST): UTC+2 (CEST)

Gascueña de Bornova (Spanish pronunciation: [ɡasˈkweɲa ðe βoɾˈnoβa]) is a municipality located in the province of Guadalajara, Castile-La Mancha, Spain. According to the 2004 census (INE), the municipality has a population of 54 inhabitants.
