= Arbancón =

Arbancón, Spain
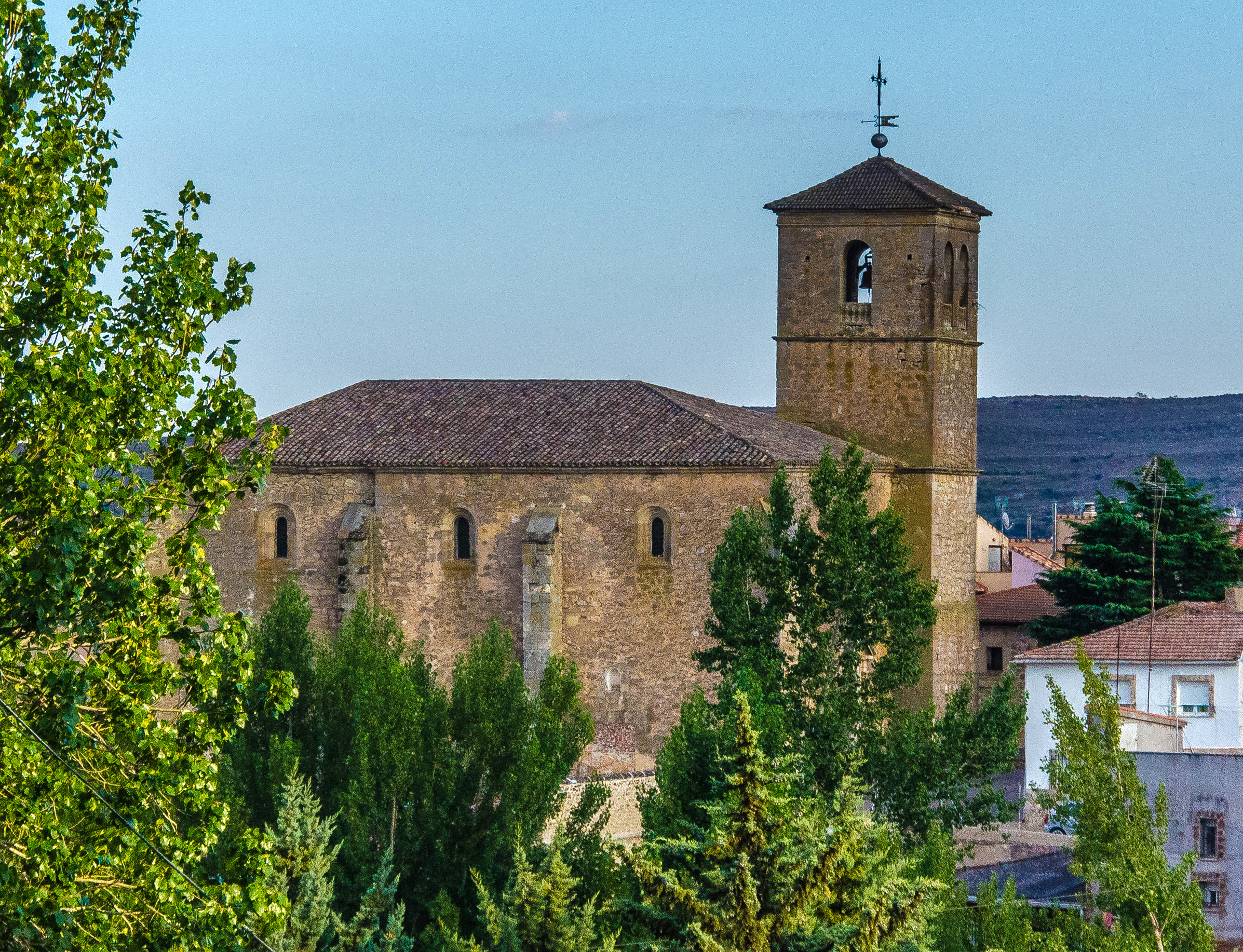

- Coat of arms

- Location within Province of Guadalajara Location within Castilla-La Mancha Location within Spain
- Coordinates: 40°57′57″N 3°06′49″W
- Country: Spain
- Autonomous community: Castile-La Mancha
- Province: Guadalajara
- Municipality: Arbancón

Area
  - Total: 35 km^{2} (14 sq mi)

Population (2025-01-01)
  - Total: 157
  - Density: 4.5/km^{2} (12/sq mi)
- Time zone: UTC+1 (CET)
  - Summer (DST): UTC+2 (CEST)

Arbancón is a municipality located in the province of Guadalajara, Castile-La Mancha, Spain. According to the 2004 census (INE), the municipality has a population of 197 inhabitants.
