= Alarilla =

Alarilla, Spain
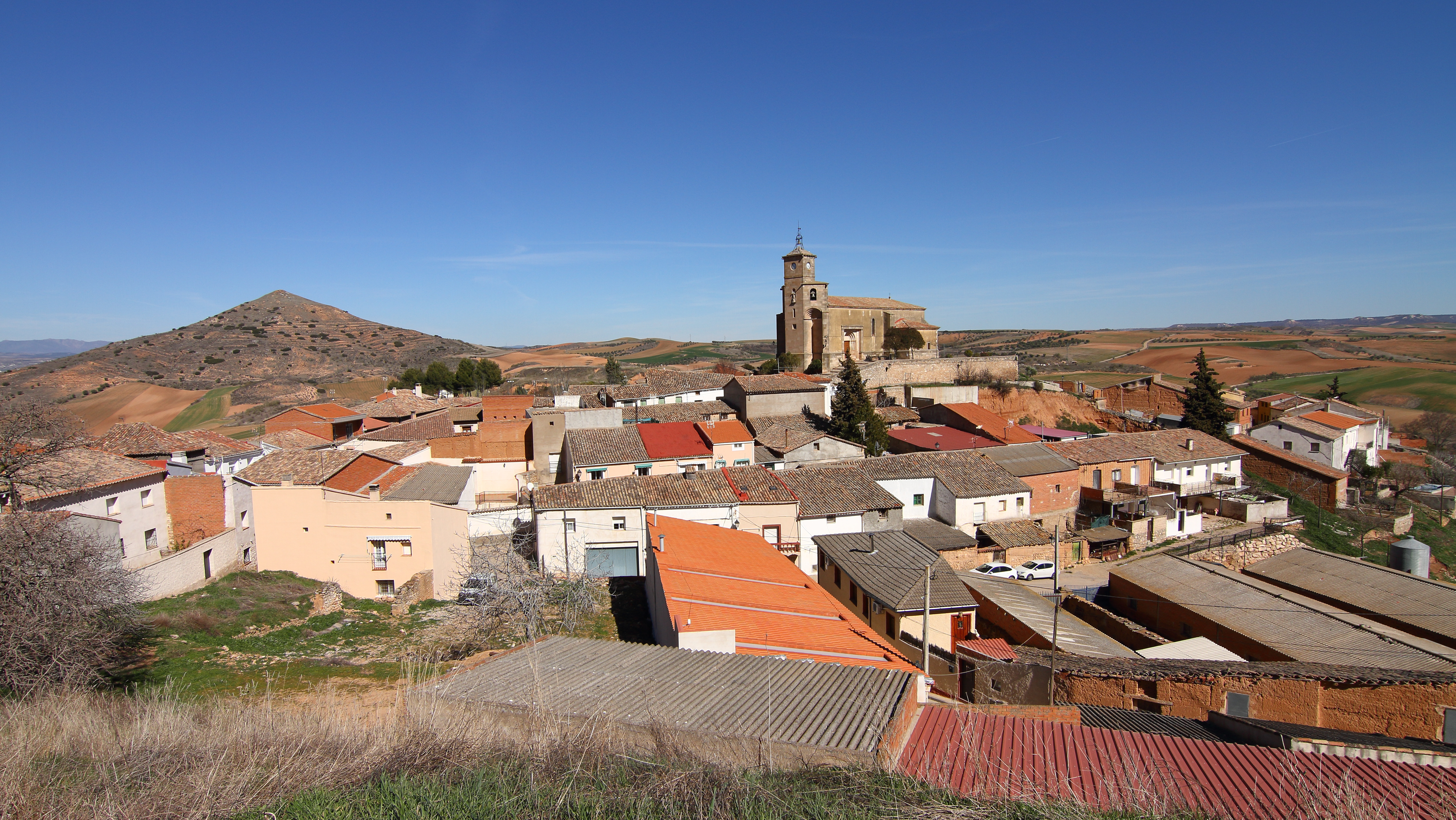

- Coat of arms

- Location within Province of Guadalajara Location within Castilla-La Mancha Location within Spain
- Coordinates: 40°50′56″N 3°06′20″W
- Country: Spain
- Autonomous community: Castile-La Mancha
- Province: Guadalajara
- Municipality: Alarilla

Area
  - Total: 22.29 km^{2} (8.61 sq mi)

Population (2025-01-01)
  - Total: 144
  - Density: 6.46/km^{2} (16.7/sq mi)
- Time zone: UTC+1 (CET)
  - Summer (DST): UTC+2 (CEST)

Alarilla is a municipality located in the province of Guadalajara, Castile-La Mancha, Spain. According to the 2004 census (INE), the municipality has a population of 122 inhabitants.
