= La Toba =

La Toba, Spain
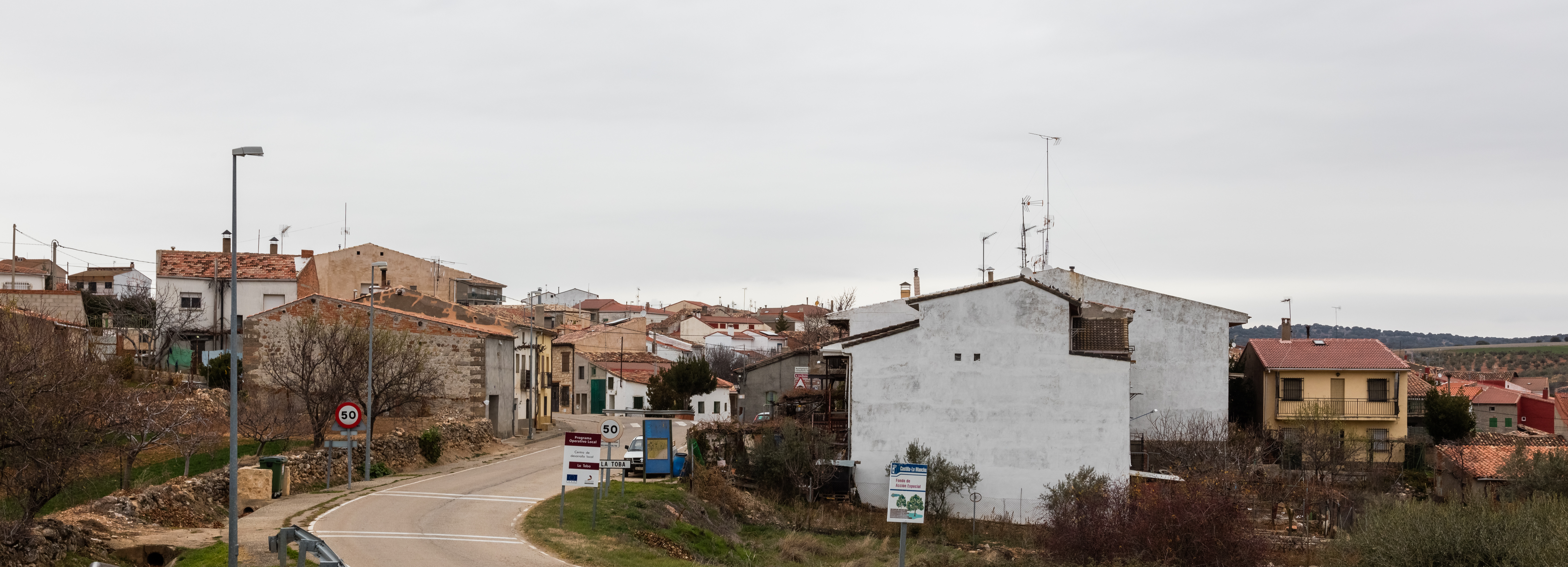

- Flag Coat of arms

- Location within Province of Guadalajara Location within Castilla-La Mancha Location within Spain
- Country: Spain
- Autonomous community: Castile-La Mancha
- Province: Guadalajara
- Municipality: La Toba

Area
  - Total: 36 km^{2} (14 sq mi)

Population (2025-01-01)
  - Total: 70
  - Density: 1.9/km^{2} (5.0/sq mi)
- Time zone: UTC+1 (CET)
  - Summer (DST): UTC+2 (CEST)

La Toba is a municipality located in the province of Guadalajara, Castile-La Mancha, Spain. According to the 2004 census (INE), the municipality has a population of 114 inhabitants.
