= Condemios de Abajo =

Condemios de Abajo, Spain
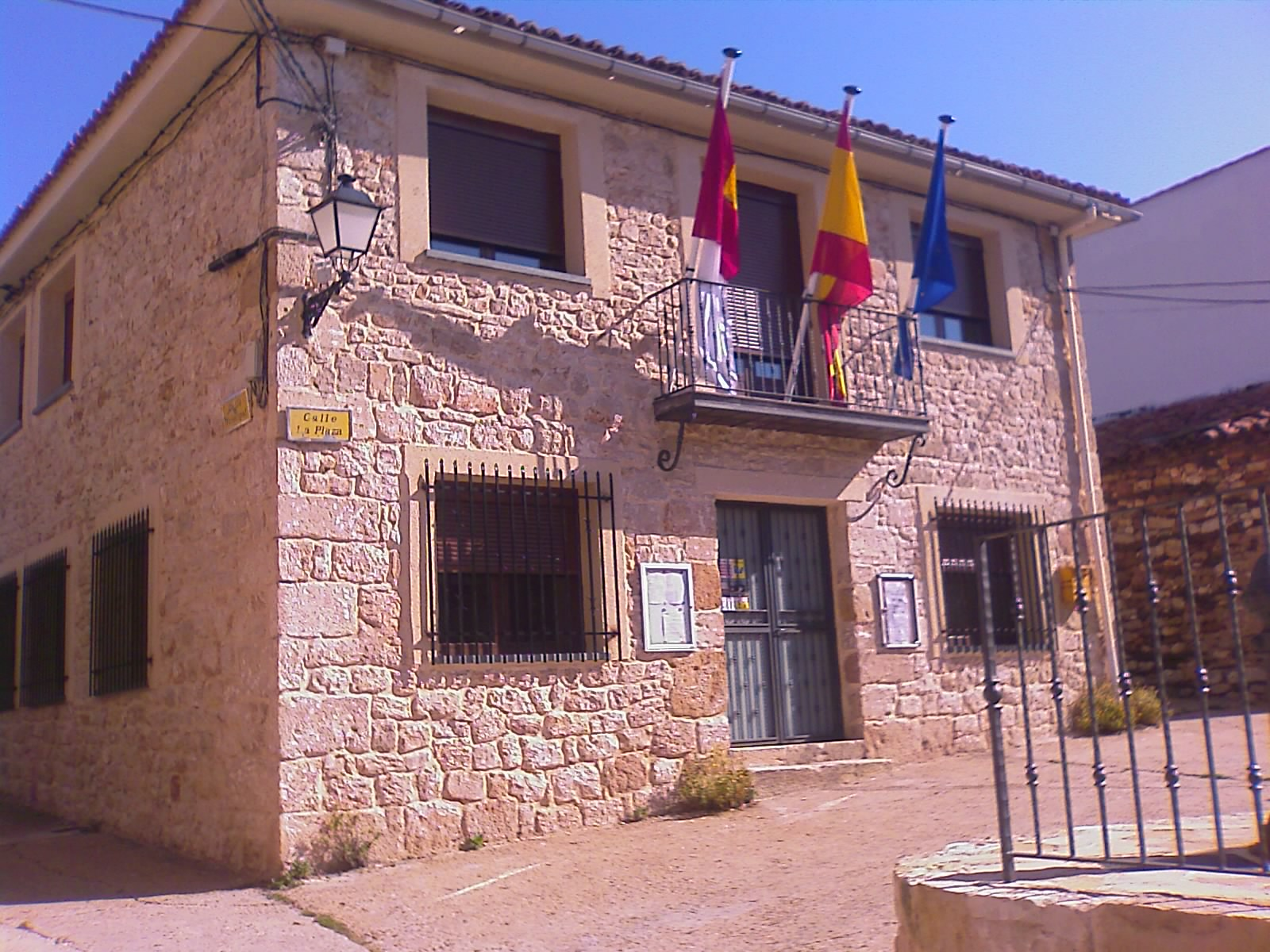

- Location within Province of Guadalajara Location within Castilla-La Mancha Location within Spain
- Country: Spain
- Autonomous community: Castile-La Mancha
- Province: Guadalajara
- Municipality: Condemios de Abajo

Area
  - Total: 12 km^{2} (4.6 sq mi)

Population (2025-01-01)
  - Total: 14
  - Density: 1.2/km^{2} (3.0/sq mi)
- Time zone: UTC+1 (CET)
  - Summer (DST): UTC+2 (CEST)

Condemios de Abajo is a municipality located in the province of Guadalajara, Castile-La Mancha, Spain. According to the 2004 census (INE), the municipality has a population of 29 inhabitants.
