= Semillas =

Semillas, Spain
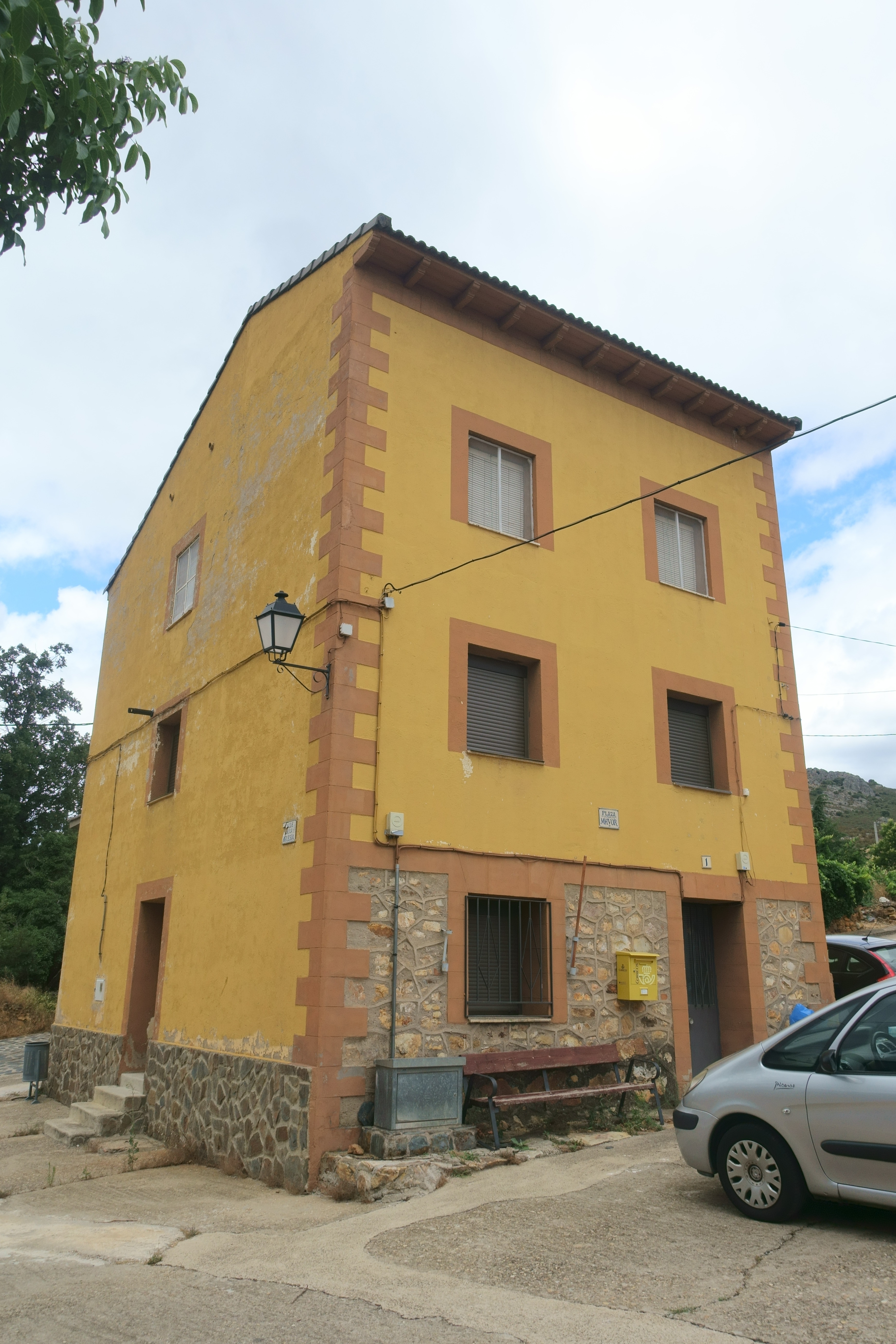
- Town hall

- Location within Province of Guadalajara Location within Castilla-La Mancha Location within Spain
- Country: Spain
- Autonomous community: Castile-La Mancha
- Province: Guadalajara
- Municipality: Semillas

Area
  - Total: 49 km^{2} (19 sq mi)

Population (2025-01-01)
  - Total: 25
  - Density: 0.51/km^{2} (1.3/sq mi)
- Time zone: UTC+1 (CET)
  - Summer (DST): UTC+2 (CEST)

Semillas is a municipality located in the province of Guadalajara, Castile-La Mancha, Spain. According to the 2004 census (INE), the municipality has a population of 50 inhabitants.
