= Ujados =

Ujados, Spain
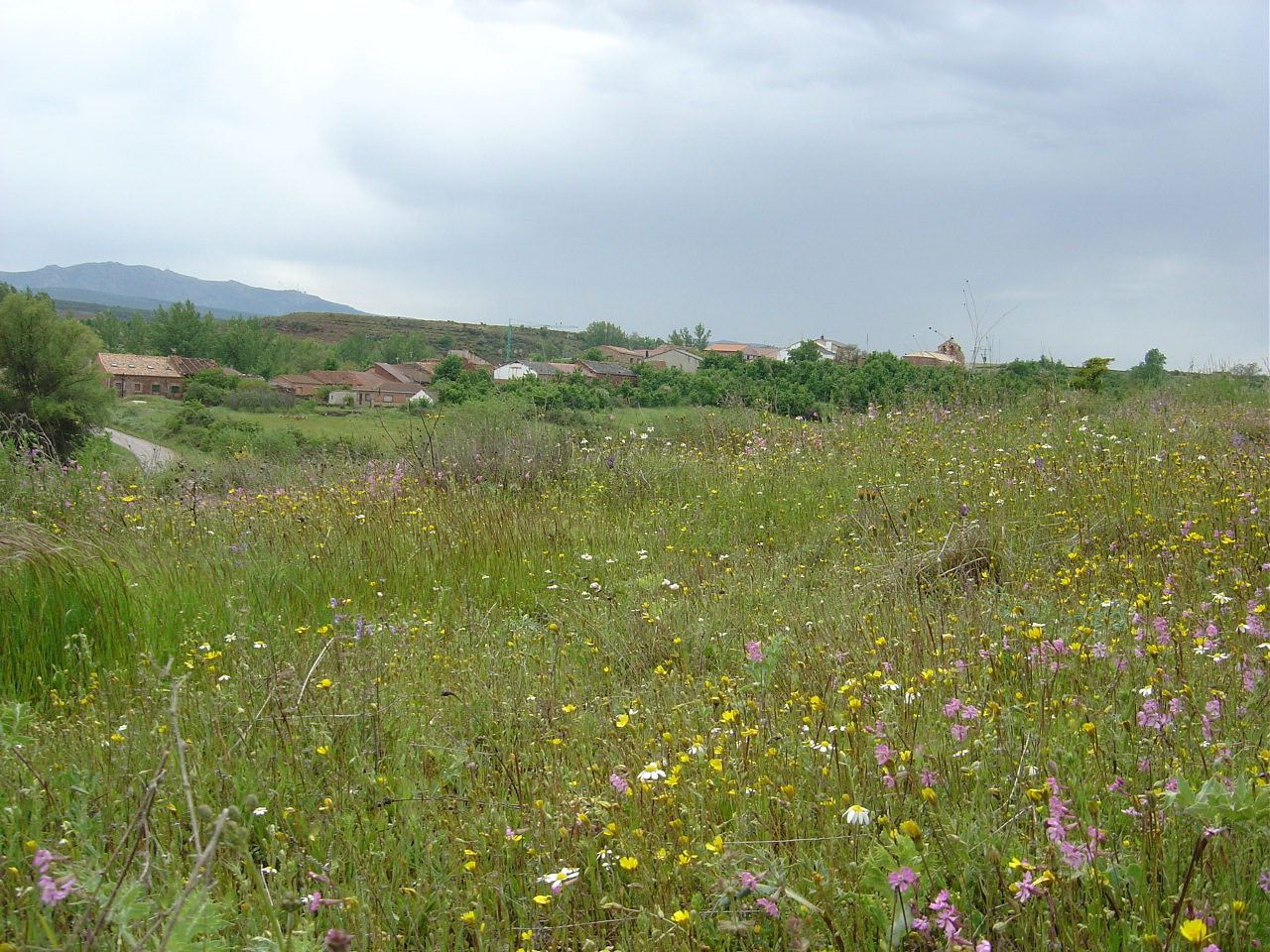

- Located in Spain Ujados, Spain (Castilla-La Mancha) Ujados, Spain (Spain)
- Coordinates: 41°14′11″N 3°00′13″W
- Country: Spain
- Autonomous community: Castile-La Mancha
- Province: Guadalajara
- Municipality: Ujados

Area
  - Total: 11.84 km^{2} (4.57 sq mi)

Population (2025-01-01)
  - Total: 20
  - Density: 1.7/km^{2} (4.4/sq mi)
- Time zone: UTC+1 (CET)
  - Summer (DST): UTC+2 (CEST)

Ujados is a municipality located in the province of Guadalajara, Castile-La Mancha, Spain. According to the 2023 census (INE), the municipality has a population of 25 inhabitants.

== Population ==
Year	Residents
1981	57
1991	48
2001	30
2011	31
2021	30
2025	20

== Geography ==
The municipality of Ujados is located in the northern part of the Province of Guadalajara, within the autonomous community of Castile-La Mancha in central Spain. The municipality lies in the Sierra Norte de Guadalajara area, a rural mountainous region situated near the Sierra de Pela mountain range.

The approximate geographical coordinates of the municipality are:

- Latitude: 41°14′ N (≈ 41.235° N)
- Longitude: 3°00′ W (≈ −3.006° W)
