= Prádena de Atienza =

Prádena de Atienza, Spain
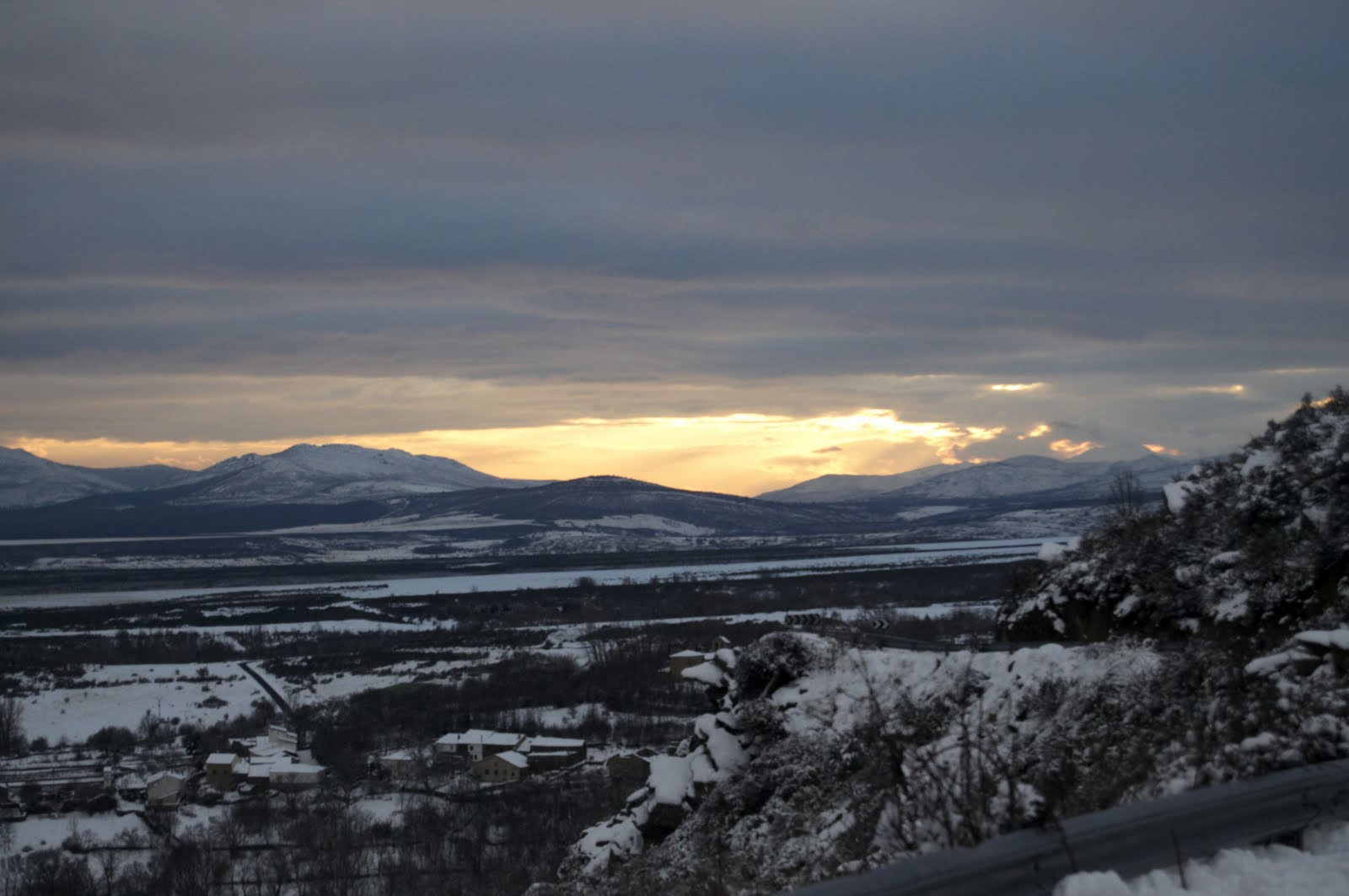

- Location within Province of Guadalajara Location within Castilla-La Mancha Location within Spain
- Country: Spain
- Autonomous community: Castile-La Mancha
- Province: Guadalajara
- Municipality: Prádena de Atienza

Area
  - Total: 28 km^{2} (11 sq mi)

Population (2025-01-01)
  - Total: 45
  - Density: 1.6/km^{2} (4.2/sq mi)
- Time zone: UTC+1 (CET)
  - Summer (DST): UTC+2 (CEST)

Prádena de Atienza is a municipality located in the province of Guadalajara, Castile-La Mancha, Spain. According to the 2004 census (INE), the municipality has a population of 50 inhabitants.

== Geography ==
It has an area of 28.86 km² and a population density of 1.59 inhabitants/km² ( INE 2015).

The inhabitants of Prádena are known as "pradenses." However, residents of nearby towns also call them "praineros," although this term is not widely accepted by the locals.
