= Aldeanueva de Guadalajara =

Aldeanueva de Guadalajara, Spain
- Coat of arms

- Location within Province of Guadalajara Location within Castilla-La Mancha Location within Spain
- Coordinates: 40°40′59″N 3°02′45″W
- Country: Spain
- Autonomous community: Castile-La Mancha
- Province: Guadalajara
- Municipality: Aldeanueva de Guadalajara

Area
  - Total: 16 km^{2} (6.2 sq mi)
- Elevation: 946 m (3,104 ft)

Population (2025-01-01)
  - Total: 107
  - Density: 6.7/km^{2} (17/sq mi)
- Time zone: UTC+1 (CET)
  - Summer (DST): UTC+2 (CEST)

Aldeanueva de Guadalajara is a municipality located in the province of Guadalajara, Castile-La Mancha, Spain. According to the 2004 census (INE), the municipality has a population of 115 inhabitants.
