= Estriégana =

Estriégana, Spain
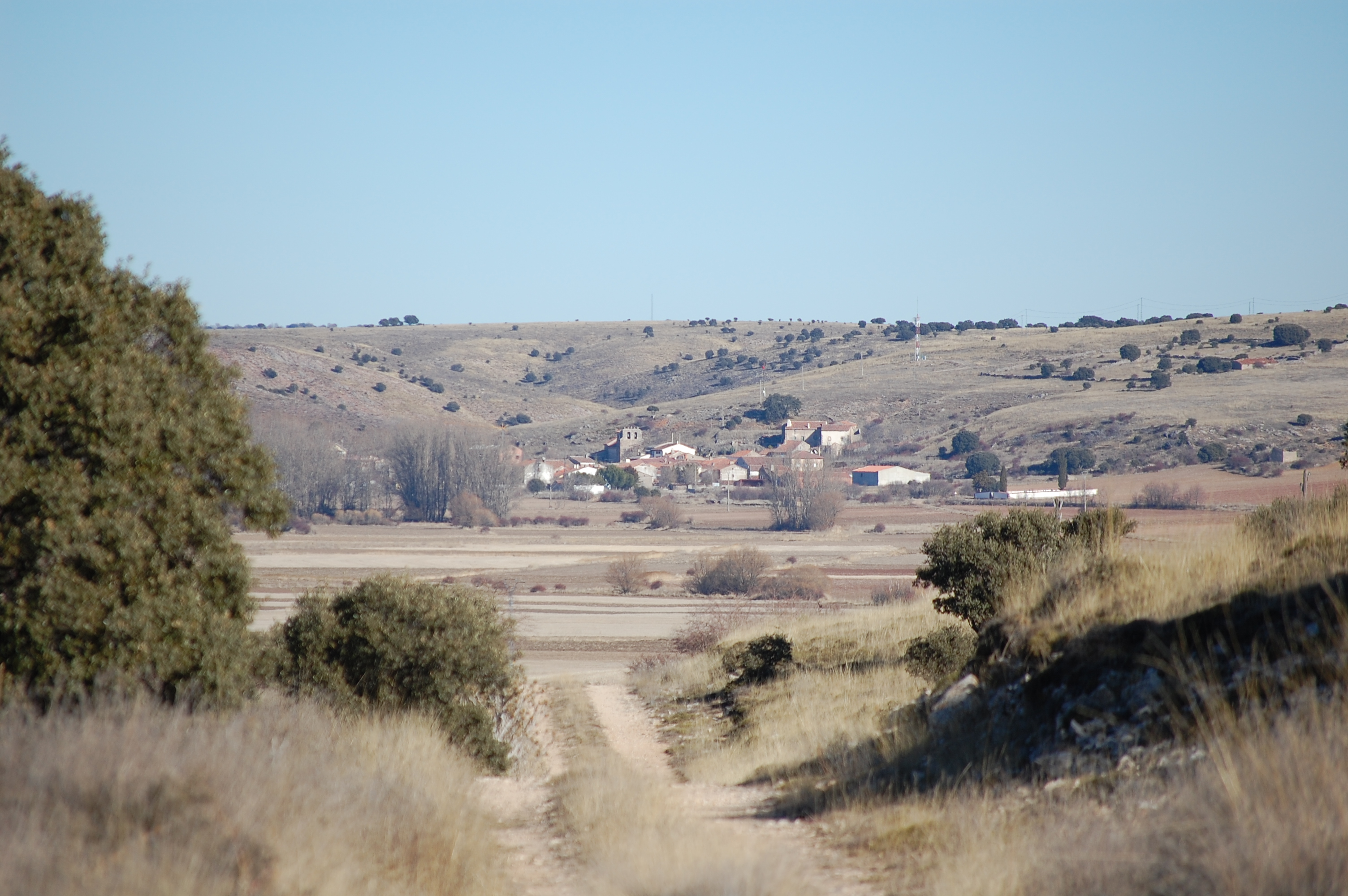

- Coat of arms

- Location within Province of Guadalajara Location within Castilla-La Mancha Location within Spain
- Coordinates: 41°03′33″N 2°31′21″W
- Country: Spain
- Autonomous community: Castile-La Mancha
- Province: Guadalajara
- Municipality: Estriégana

Area
  - Total: 16 km^{2} (6.2 sq mi)

Population (2025-01-01)
  - Total: 13
  - Density: 0.81/km^{2} (2.1/sq mi)
- Time zone: UTC+1 (CET)
  - Summer (DST): UTC+2 (CEST)

Estriégana (Spanish pronunciation: [esˈtɾje.ɣa.na]) is a municipality located in the province of Guadalajara, Castile-La Mancha, Spain. According to the 2004 census (INE), the municipality has a population of 24 inhabitants.
