= Morenilla =

Morenilla, Spain
- Location within Province of Guadalajara Location within Castilla-La Mancha Location within Spain
- Country: Spain
- Autonomous community: Castile-La Mancha
- Province: Guadalajara
- Municipality: Morenilla

Area
  - Total: 28.37 km^{2} (10.95 sq mi)
- Elevation: 1,189 m (3,901 ft)

Population (2025-01-01)
  - Total: 53
  - Density: 1.9/km^{2} (4.8/sq mi)
- Time zone: UTC+1 (CET)
  - Summer (DST): UTC+2 (CEST)

Morenilla is a municipality located in the province of Guadalajara, Castile-La Mancha, Spain. According to the 2004 census (INE), the municipality had a population of 51 inhabitants.
