= El Cubillo de Uceda =

El Cubillo de Uceda, Spain
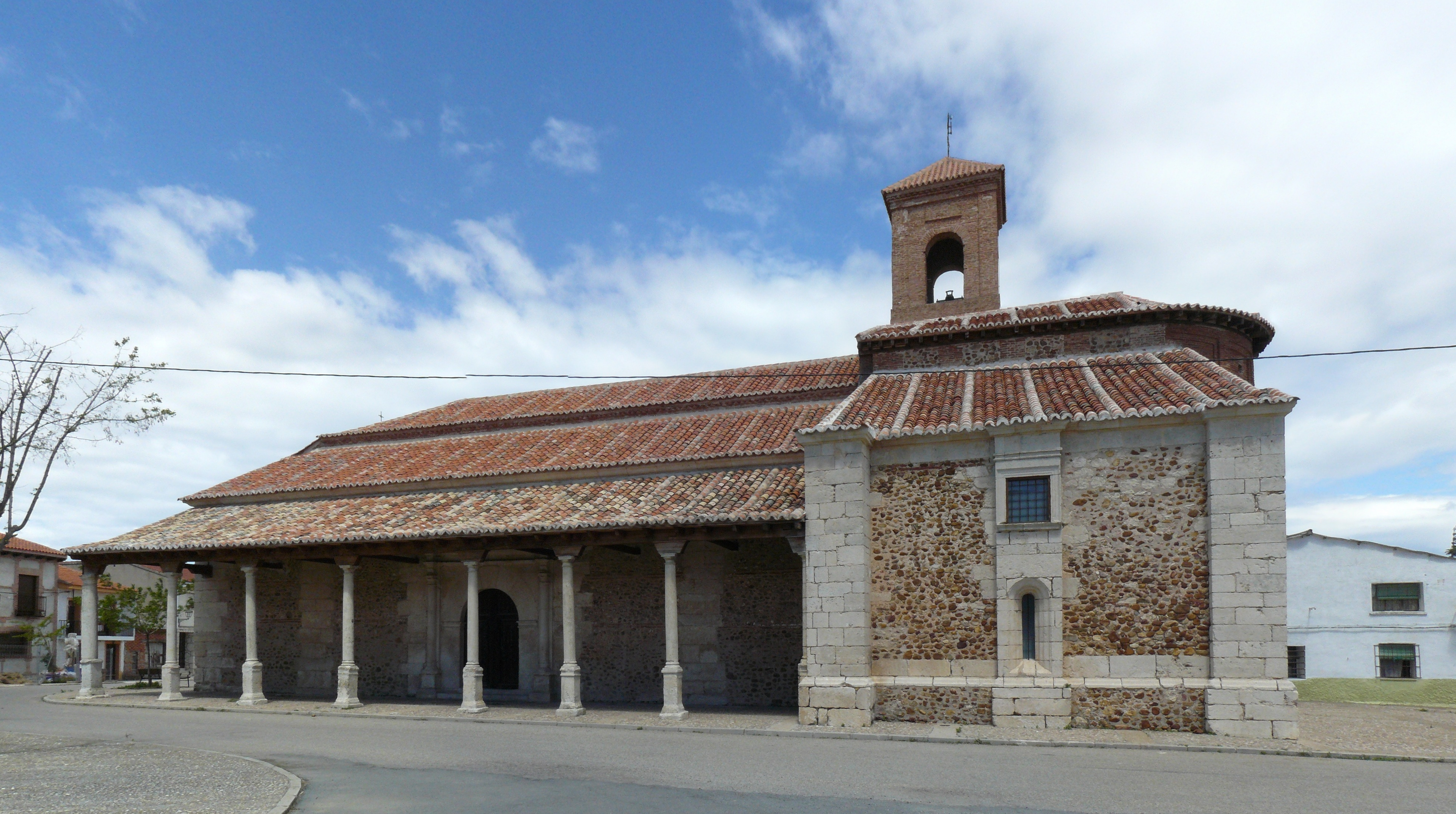

- Coat of arms

- Location within Province of Guadalajara Location within Castilla-La Mancha Location within Spain
- Coordinates: 40°49′30″N 3°24′17″W
- Country: Spain
- Autonomous community: Castile-La Mancha
- Province: Guadalajara
- Municipality: El Cubillo de Uceda

Area
  - Total: 32 km^{2} (12 sq mi)

Population (2025-01-01)
  - Total: 120
  - Density: 3.8/km^{2} (9.7/sq mi)
- Time zone: UTC+1 (CET)
  - Summer (DST): UTC+2 (CEST)

El Cubillo de Uceda is a municipality located in the province of Guadalajara, Castile-La Mancha, Spain. According to the 2004 census (INE), the municipality has a population of 119 inhabitants.
