= Arroyo de las Fraguas =

Arroyo de las Fraguas, Spain
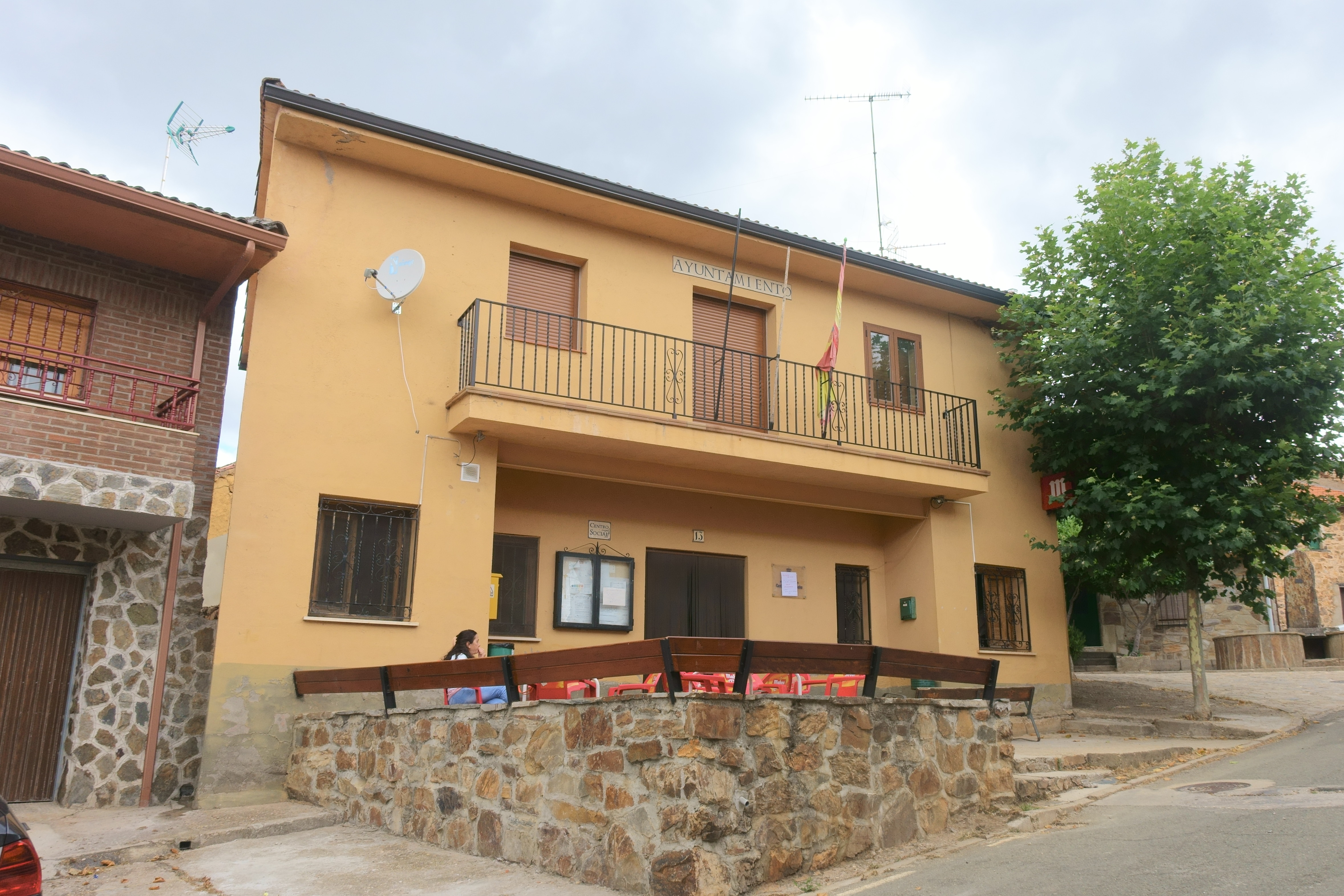
- Town hall

- Location within Province of Guadalajara Location within Castilla-La Mancha Location within Spain
- Coordinates: 41°06′15″N 3°07′49″W
- Country: Spain
- Autonomous community: Castile-La Mancha
- Province: Guadalajara
- Municipality: Arroyo de las Fraguas

Area
  - Total: 21 km^{2} (8.1 sq mi)

Population (2025-01-01)
  - Total: 32
  - Density: 1.5/km^{2} (3.9/sq mi)
- Time zone: UTC+1 (CET)
  - Summer (DST): UTC+2 (CEST)

Arroyo de las Fraguas is a municipality located in the province of Guadalajara, Castile-La Mancha, Spain. According to the 2004 census (INE), the municipality has a population of 42 inhabitants.
