= Torremochuela =

Torremochuela, Spain
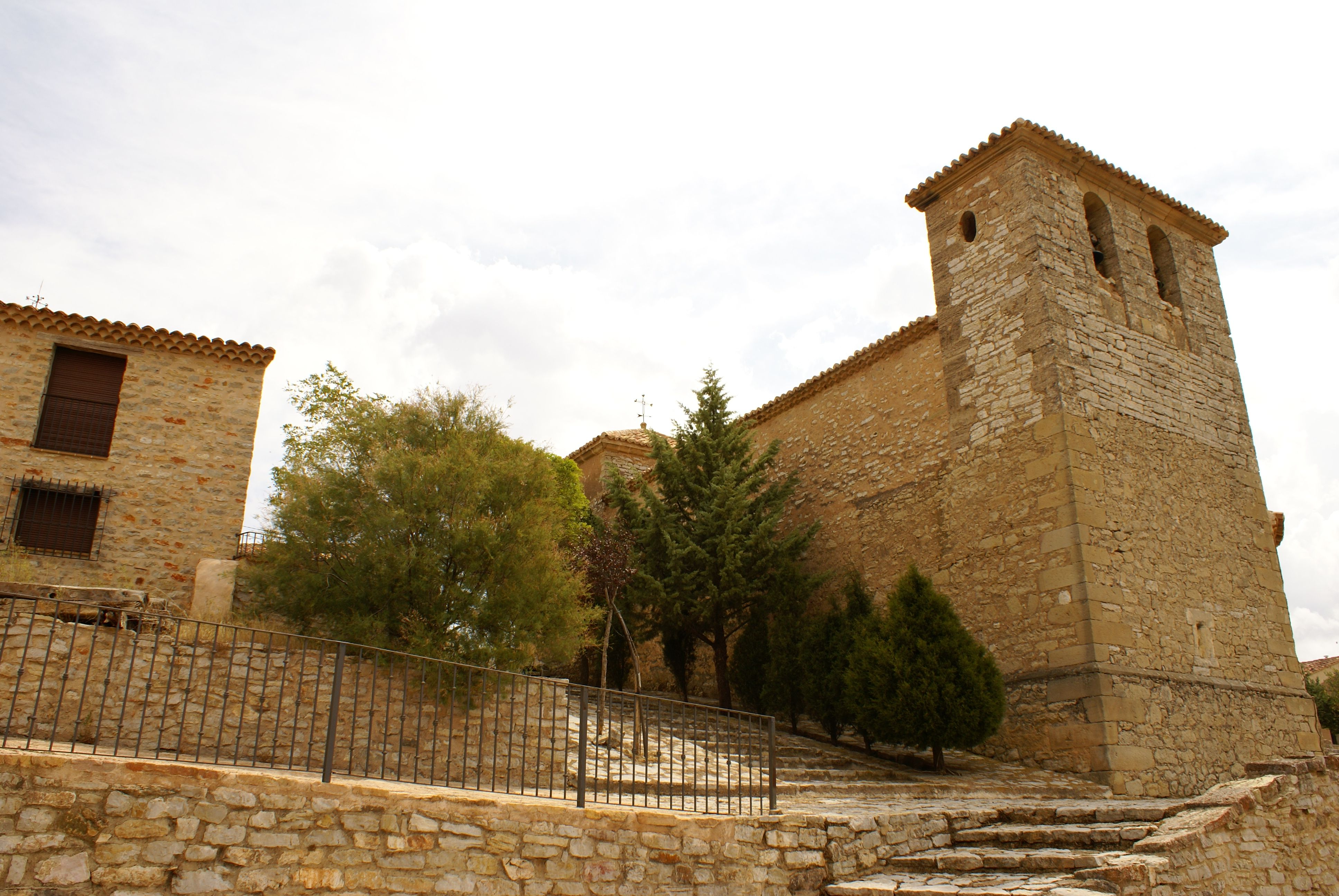

- Location within Province of Guadalajara Location within Castilla-La Mancha Location within Spain
- Coordinates: 40°46′01″N 1°50′25″W
- Country: Spain
- Autonomous community: Castile-La Mancha
- Province: Guadalajara
- Municipality: Torremochuela

Area
  - Total: 17 km^{2} (6.6 sq mi)

Population (2025)
  - Total: 6
  - Density: 0.35/km^{2} (0.91/sq mi)
- Time zone: UTC+1 (CET)
  - Summer (DST): UTC+2 (CEST)

Torremochuela is a municipality located in the province of Guadalajara, Castile-La Mancha, Spain.

== Demography ==
According to the 2025 census (INE), the municipality has a population of 6 inhabitants.
