= Negredo =

Negredo, Spain
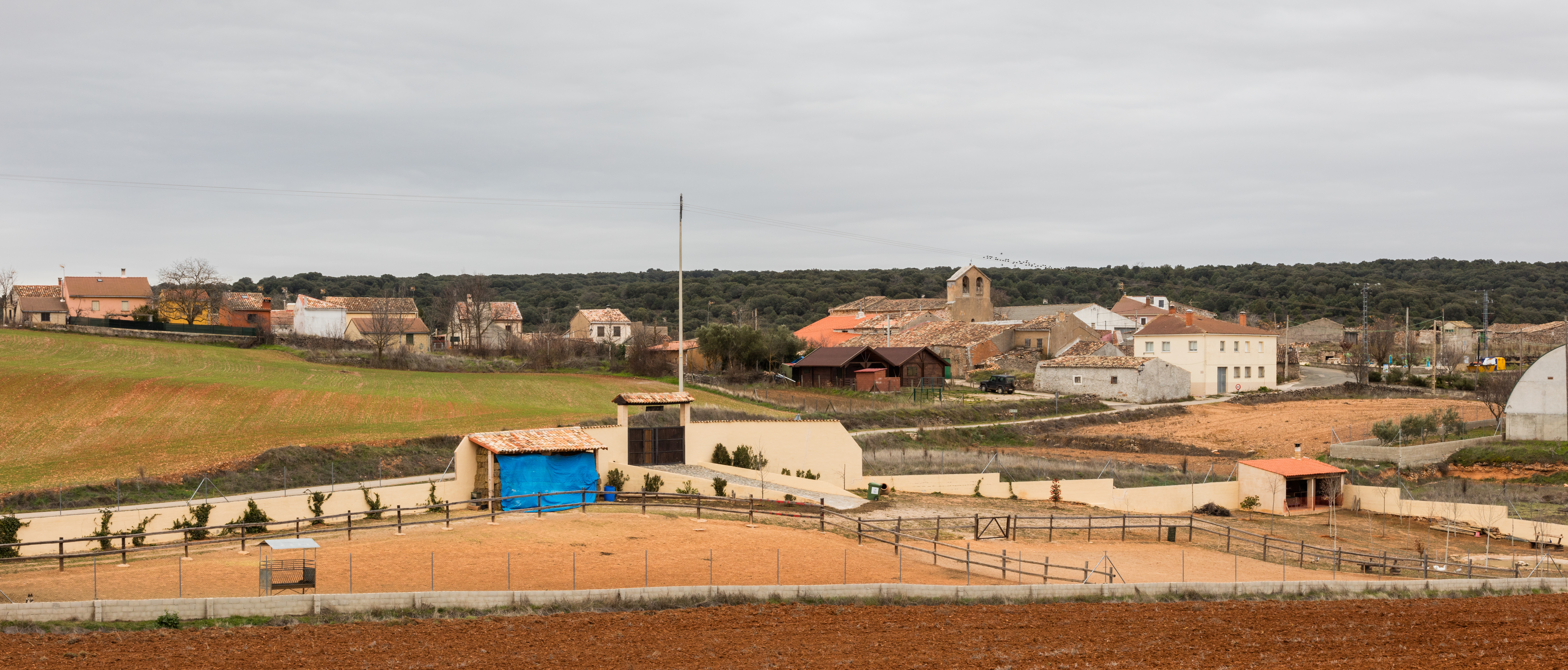

- Location within Province of Guadalajara Location within Castilla-La Mancha Location within Spain
- Country: Spain
- Autonomous community: Castile-La Mancha
- Province: Guadalajara
- Municipality: Negredo

Area
  - Total: 18.34 km^{2} (7.08 sq mi)
- Elevation: 987 m (3,238 ft)

Population (2025-01-01)
  - Total: 12
  - Density: 0.65/km^{2} (1.7/sq mi)
- Time zone: UTC+1 (CET)
  - Summer (DST): UTC+2 (CEST)

Negredo is a municipality located in the province of Guadalajara, Castile-La Mancha, Spain. According to the 2004 census (INE), the municipality had a population of 20 inhabitants.
