= Robledo de Corpes =

Coordinates: 41°07′09″N 2°56′54″W

Robledo de Corpes, Spain
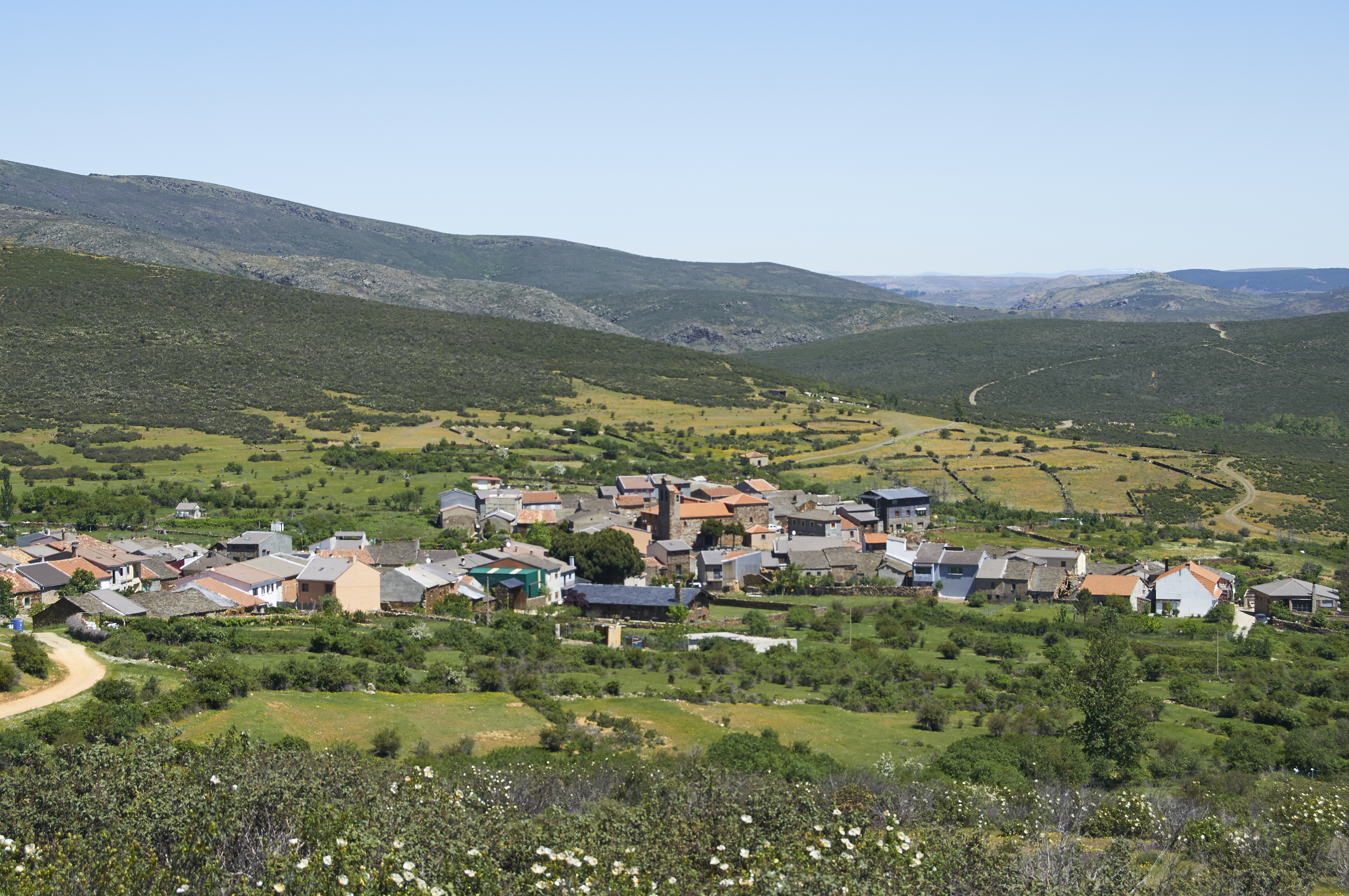
- Panoramic view of Robledo de Corpes

- Flag Coat of arms
- Interactive map of Robledo de Corpes, Spain
- Country: Spain
- Autonomous community: Castile-La Mancha
- Province: Guadalajara
- Municipality: Robledo de Corpes

Area
  - Total: 40 km^{2} (15 sq mi)

Population (2025-01-01)
  - Total: 39
  - Density: 0.98/km^{2} (2.5/sq mi)
- Time zone: UTC+1 (CET)
  - Summer (DST): UTC+2 (CEST)

Robledo de Corpes is a municipality located in the province of Guadalajara, Castile-La Mancha, Spain. According to the 2004 census (INE), the municipality has a population of 108 inhabitants.
