= Sacecorbo =

Sacecorbo, Spain
- Location within Province of Guadalajara Location within Castilla-La Mancha Location within Spain
- Country: Spain
- Autonomous community: Castile-La Mancha
- Province: Guadalajara
- Municipality: Sacecorbo

Area
  - Total: 72 km^{2} (28 sq mi)

Population (2025-01-01)
  - Total: 90
  - Density: 1.3/km^{2} (3.2/sq mi)
- Time zone: UTC+1 (CET)
  - Summer (DST): UTC+2 (CEST)

Sacecorbo is a municipality located in the province of Guadalajara, Castile-La Mancha, Spain. According to the 2004 census (INE), the municipality has a population of 163 inhabitants.
