= List of municipalities in Guadalajara =

Map of Spain with the province of Guadalajara highlighted

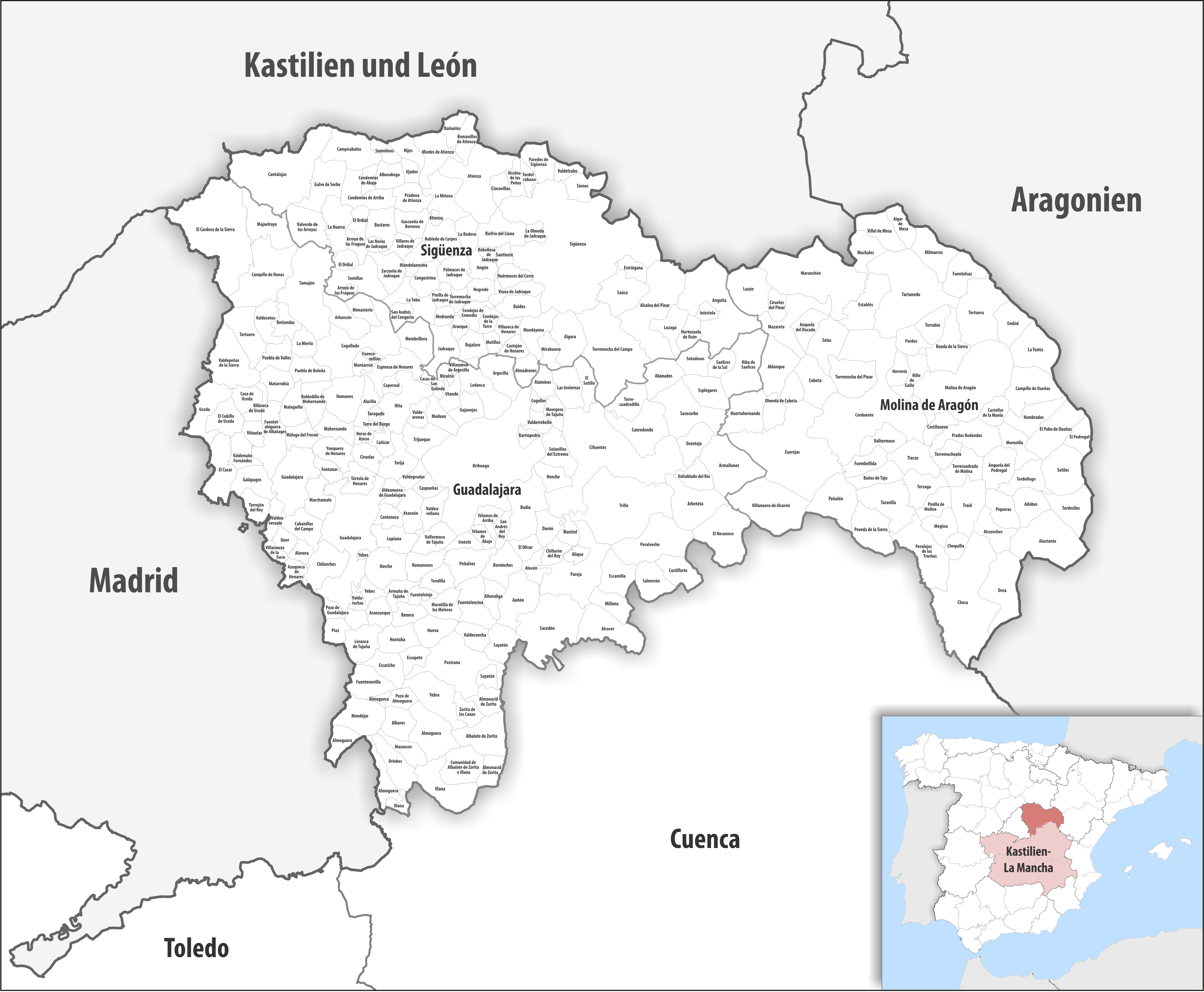
Map of the municipalities in the province of Guadalajara

Guadalajara is a province in the autonomous community of Castilla–La Mancha, Spain. The provinve is divided into 288 municipalities. As of the 2023 Spanish census, Guadalajara is the 42nd most populous of Spain's 50 provinces, with 275,082 inhabitants, and the 17th largest by land area, spanning 12,168 km^{2} (4,698 sq mi). Municipalities are the most basic local political division in Spain and can only belong to one province. They enjoy a large degree of autonomy in their local administration, being in charge of tasks such as urban planning, water supply, lighting, roads, local police, and firefighting.

The organisation of municipalities in Spain is outlined by the local government law Ley 7/1985, de 2 de abril, Reguladora de las Bases del Régimen Local (transl. Law 7/1985, of 2 April, Regulating the Bases of the Local Administration), which was passed by the Cortes Generales—Spain’s national parliament—on 2 April 1985 and finalised by royal decree on 18 April 1986. Municipalities in Guadalajara are also governed by the Statute of Autonomy of Castilla-La Mancha, which includes provisions concerning their relations with Castilla–La Mancha's autonomous government. All citizens of Spain are required to register in the municipality in which they reside. Each municipality is a corporation (Note: Within the context of local government in Spain, a corporation is a legal entity representing a municipality. Each municipality is empowered to govern over a specific piece of land and its population.) with independent legal personhood: its governing body is called the ayuntamiento (municipal council or corporation), a term often also used to refer to the municipal offices (city and town halls). The ayuntamiento is composed of the mayor (Spanish: alcalde), the deputy mayors (tenientes de alcalde) and the councillors (concejales), who form the plenary (pleno), the deliberative body. Municipalities are categorised by population for determining the number of councillors: three when the population is up to 100 inhabitants, five for 101–250, seven for 251–1,000, nine for 1,001–2,000, eleven for 2,001–5,000, thirteen for 5,001–10,000, seventeen for 10,001–20,000, twenty-one for 20,001–50,000, and twenty-five for 50,001–100,000.

The mayor and the deputy mayors are elected by the plenary assembly, which is itself elected by universal suffrage. Elections in municipalities with more than 250 inhabitants are carried out following a proportional representation system with closed lists, whilst those with a population lower than 250 use a block plurality voting system with open lists. The plenary assembly must meet periodically, with meetings occurring more or less frequently depending on the population of the municipality: monthly for those whose population is larger than 20,000, once every two months if it ranges between 5,001 and 20,000, and once every three months if it does not exceed 5,000. Many ayuntamientos also have a local governing board (Spanish: junta de gobierno local), which is appointed by the mayor from amongst the councillors and is required for municipalities of over 5,000 inhabitants. The board, whose role is to assist the mayor between meetings of the plenary assembly, may not include more than one third of the councillors.

The largest municipality by population in the province as of the 2023 Spanish census is Guadalajara, its capital, with 88,886 residents, while the smallest is Torremochuela, with 6 residents. The largest municipality by area is Sigüenza, which spans 386.87 square kilometres (149.37 sq mi), while Torre del Burgo is the smallest at 4.91 square kilometres (1.90 sq mi).

== Municipalities ==
Largest municipalities in the province of Guadalajara by population

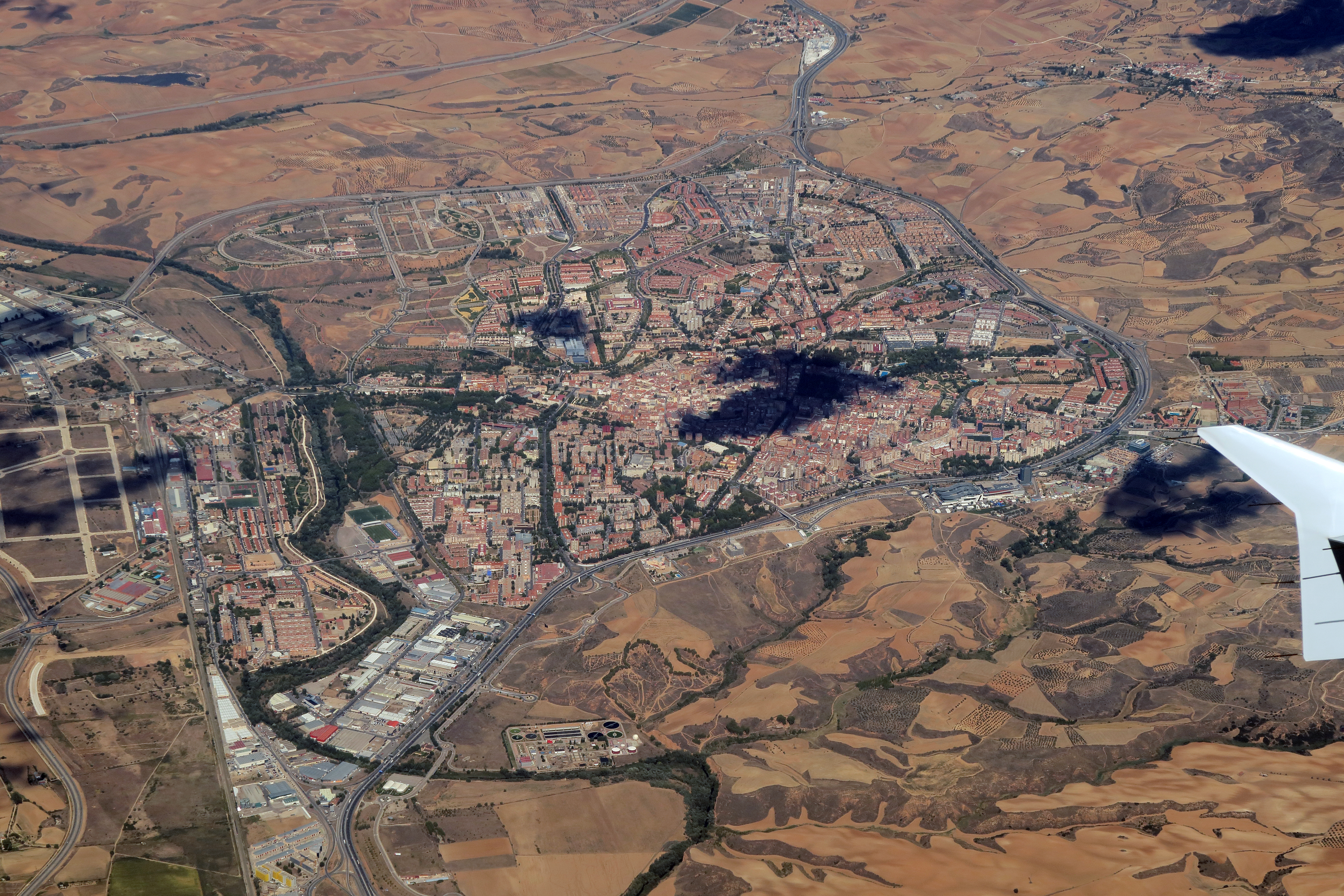
Guadalajara is the province's capital and largest municipality by population.

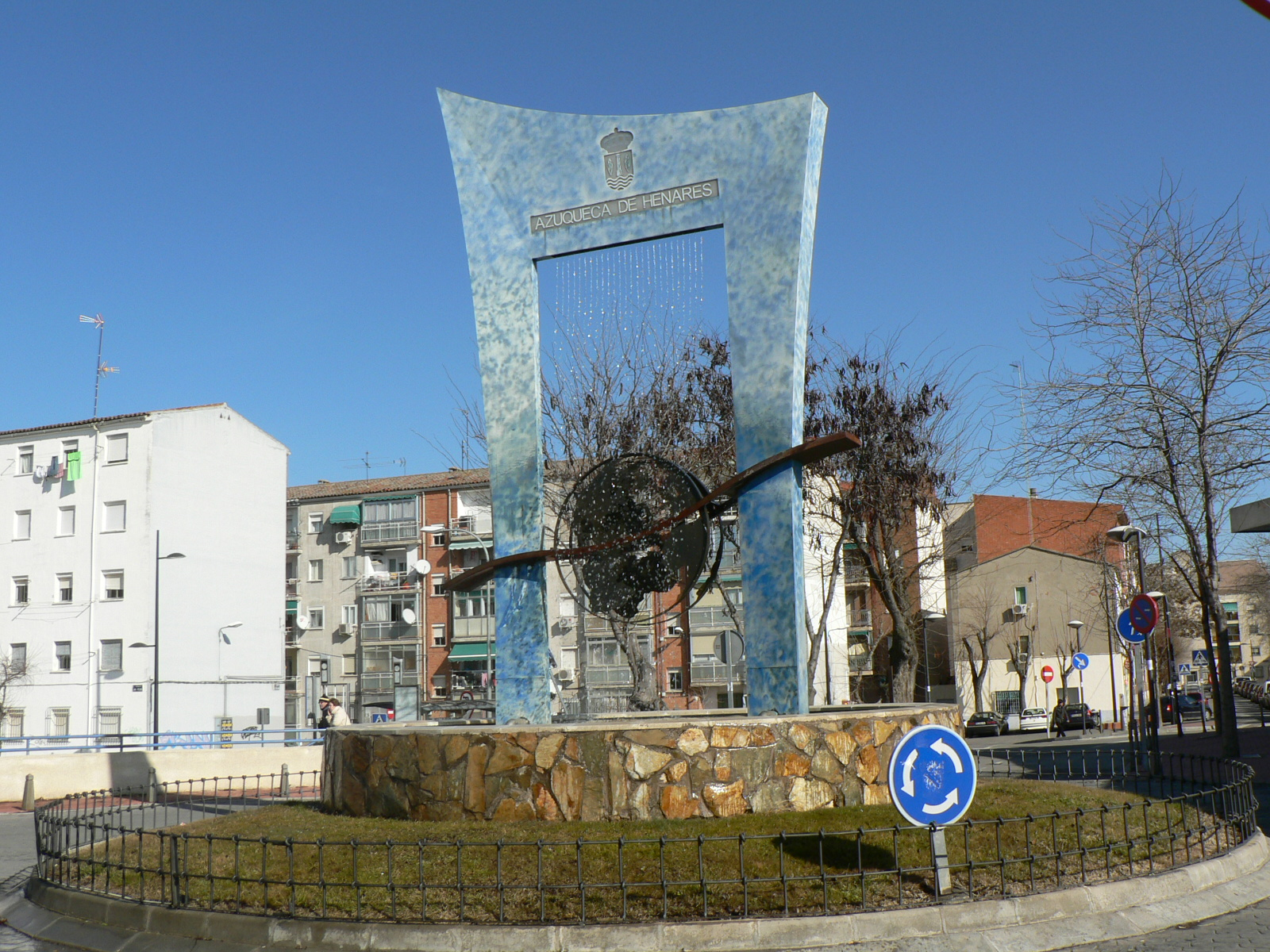
Azuqueca de Henares, the second largest municipality by population in the province of Guadalajara

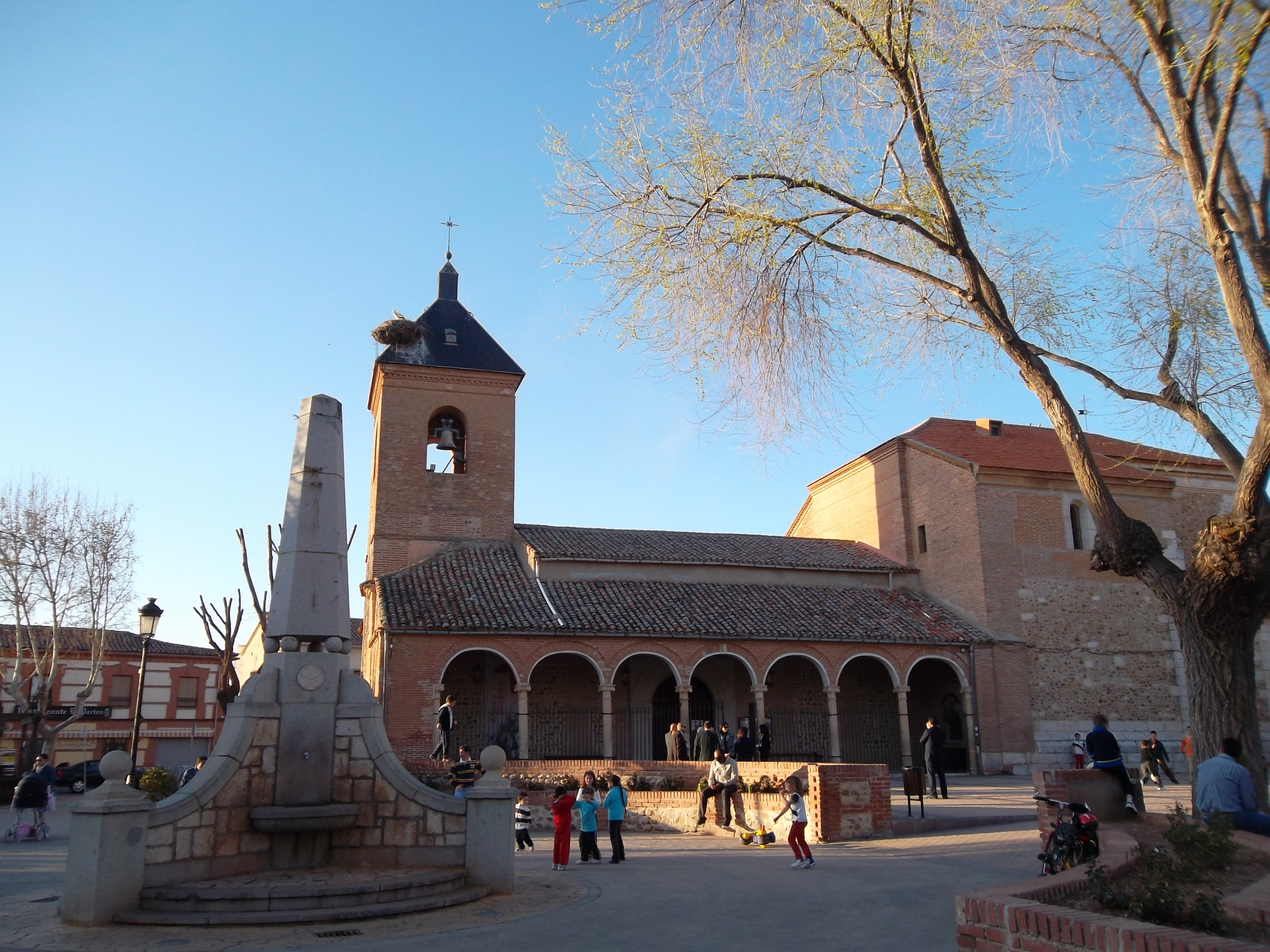
Alovera is the province of Guadalajara's third largest municipality by population.

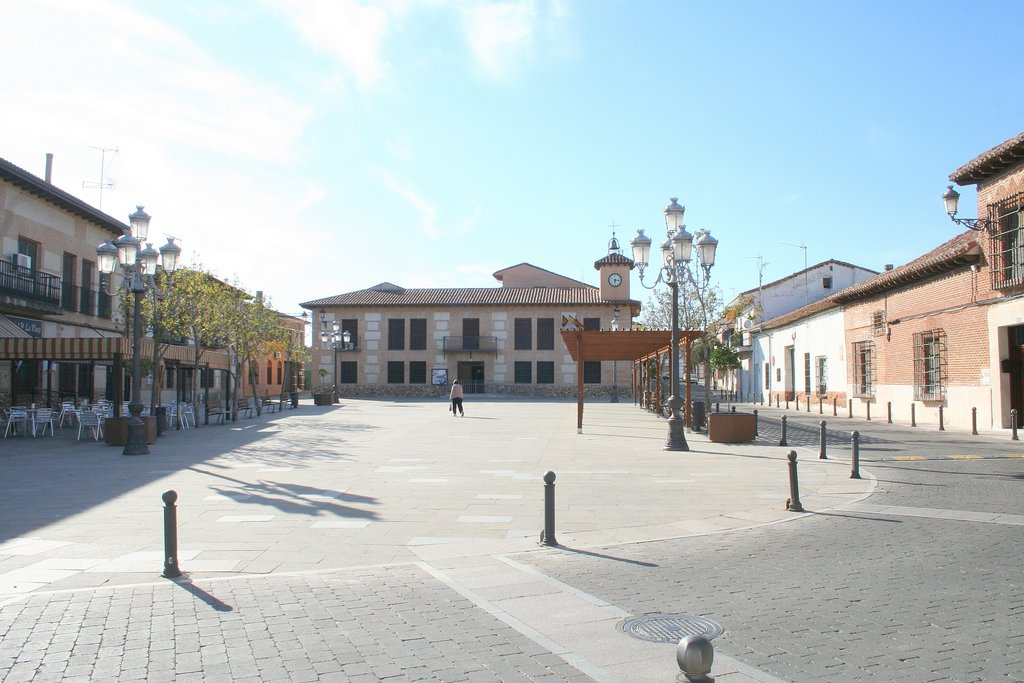
El Casar, the province of Guadalajara's fourth largest municipality by population

† Provincial capital

Municipalities in the province of Guadalajara
Name	Population (2023 census)	Population (2011 census)	Population change	Land area (km^{2})	Population density (2023)
Abánades	63	72	−12.5%	36.08	1.7/km^{2}
Ablanque	68	103	−34.0%	51.40	1.3/km^{2}
Adobes	30	52	−42.3%	32.66	0.9/km^{2}
Alaminos	62	70	−11.4%	19.50	3.2/km^{2}
Alarilla	141	113	+24.8%	22.14	6.4/km^{2}
Albalate de Zorita	1,137	1,081	+5.2%	53.32	21.3/km^{2}
Albares	526	542	−3.0%	29.44	17.9/km^{2}
Albendiego	46	43	+7.0%	22.91	2.0/km^{2}
Alcocer	340	327	+4.0%	61.19	5.6/km^{2}
Alcolea de las Peñas	12	16	−25.0%	16.66	0.7/km^{2}
Alcolea del Pinar	331	390	−15.1%	113.35	2.9/km^{2}
Alcoroches	133	160	−16.9%	32.25	4.1/km^{2}
Aldeanueva de Guadalajara	104	105	−1.0%	16.06	6.5/km^{2}
Algar de Mesa	46	68	−32.4%	23.83	1.9/km^{2}
Algora	101	100	+1.0%	46.95	2.2/km^{2}
Alhóndiga	169	206	−18.0%	19.26	8.8/km^{2}
Alique	14	23	−39.1%	10.92	1.3/km^{2}
Almadrones	59	93	−36.6%	21.03	2.8/km^{2}
Almoguera	1,414	1,472	−3.9%	119.42	11.8/km^{2}
Almonacid de Zorita	646	791	−18.3%	44.90	14.4/km^{2}
Alocén	159	151	+5.3%	17.88	8.9/km^{2}
Alovera	13,459	12,099	+11.2%	13.81	974.6/km^{2}
Alustante	136	221	−38.5%	93.04	1.5/km^{2}
Angón	7	17	−58.8%	20.41	0.3/km^{2}
Anguita	160	215	−25.6%	127.22	1.3/km^{2}
Anquela del Ducado	60	87	−31.0%	25.66	2.3/km^{2}
Anquela del Pedregal	27	24	+12.5%	38.23	0.7/km^{2}
Aranzueque	383	463	−17.3%	21.24	18.0/km^{2}
Arbancón	147	169	−13.0%	34.93	4.2/km^{2}
Arbeteta	19	47	−59.6%	63.00	0.3/km^{2}
Argecilla	71	77	−7.8%	40.70	1.7/km^{2}
Armallones	54	73	−26.0%	77.75	0.7/km^{2}
Armuña de Tajuña	273	249	+9.6%	20.70	13.2/km^{2}
Arroyo de las Fraguas	33	42	−21.4%	21.35	1.5/km^{2}
Atanzón	95	98	−3.1%	28.03	3.4/km^{2}
Atienza	440	487	−9.7%	104.28	4.2/km^{2}
Auñón	146	201	−27.4%	52.71	2.8/km^{2}
Azuqueca de Henares	35,352	34,572	+2.3%	19.75	1,790.0/km^{2}
Baides	56	91	−38.5%	29.87	1.9/km^{2}
Baños de Tajo	15	18	−16.7%	28.28	0.5/km^{2}
Bañuelos	13	24	−45.8%	18.77	0.7/km^{2}
Barriopedro	20	24	−16.7%	10.68	1.9/km^{2}
Berninches	50	79	−36.7%	35.36	1.4/km^{2}
La Bodera	21	37	−43.2%	21.76	1.0/km^{2}
Brihuega	2,777	2,788	−0.4%	296.41	9.4/km^{2}
Budia	208	212	−1.9%	66.09	3.1/km^{2}
Bujalaro	47	65	−27.7%	22.53	2.1/km^{2}
Bustares	71	81	−12.3%	30.38	2.3/km^{2}
Cabanillas del Campo	11,023	9,686	+13.8%	34.91	315.8/km^{2}
Campillo de Dueñas	78	92	−15.2%	60.63	1.3/km^{2}
Campillo de Ranas	156	189	−17.5%	91.69	1.7/km^{2}
Campisábalos	90	83	+8.4%	54.01	1.7/km^{2}
Canredondo	87	106	−17.9%	63.52	1.4/km^{2}
Cantalojas	126	160	−21.3%	157.06	0.8/km^{2}
Cañizar	72	82	−12.2%	15.41	4.7/km^{2}
El Cardoso de la Sierra	57	75	−24.0%	186.70	0.3/km^{2}
Casa de Uceda	100	126	−20.6%	21.38	4.7/km^{2}
El Casar	13,345	11,498	+16.1%	52.11	256.1/km^{2}
Casas de San Galindo	19	26	−26.9%	11.61	1.6/km^{2}
Caspueñas	138	115	+20.0%	14.79	9.3/km^{2}
Castejón de Henares	61	90	−32.2%	15.95	3.8/km^{2}
Castellar de la Muela	24	38	−36.8%	21.38	1.1/km^{2}
Castilforte	58	66	−12.1%	33.97	1.7/km^{2}
Castilnuevo	8	7	+14.3%	19.54	0.4/km^{2}
Cendejas de Enmedio	70	95	−26.3%	19.02	3.7/km^{2}
Cendejas de la Torre	25	40	−37.5%	14.07	1.8/km^{2}
Centenera	146	105	+39.0%	17.41	8.4/km^{2}
Checa	285	346	−17.6%	181.43	1.6/km^{2}
Chequilla	14	14	0.0%	15.30	0.9/km^{2}
Chiloeches	3,974	3,139	+26.6%	45.37	87.6/km^{2}
Chillarón del Rey	88	114	−22.8%	17.29	5.1/km^{2}
Cifuentes	1,687	2,104	−19.8%	220.23	7.7/km^{2}
Cincovillas	23	24	−4.2%	16.40	1.4/km^{2}
Ciruelas	141	118	+19.5%	21.68	6.5/km^{2}
Ciruelos del Pinar	28	34	−17.6%	16.80	1.7/km^{2}
Cobeta	101	128	−21.1%	43.59	2.3/km^{2}
Cogollor	22	33	−33.3%	8.32	2.6/km^{2}
Cogolludo	558	665	−16.1%	96.87	5.8/km^{2}
Condemios de Abajo	12	26	−53.8%	12.07	1.0/km^{2}
Condemios de Arriba	116	143	−18.9%	43.11	2.7/km^{2}
Congostrina	14	34	−58.8%	26.04	0.5/km^{2}
Copernal	39	35	+11.4%	10.10	3.9/km^{2}
Corduente	310	403	−23.1%	232.92	1.3/km^{2}
El Cubillo de Uceda	119	176	−32.4%	32.27	3.7/km^{2}
Driebes	349	425	−17.9%	37.91	9.2/km^{2}
Durón	115	118	−2.5%	23.32	4.9/km^{2}
Embid	30	53	−43.4%	36.20	0.8/km^{2}
Escamilla	65	82	−20.7%	39.27	1.7/km^{2}
Escariche	188	207	−9.2%	30.09	6.2/km^{2}
Escopete	68	72	−5.6%	19.01	3.6/km^{2}
Espinosa de Henares	661	787	−16.0%	39.42	16.8/km^{2}
Esplegares	37	42	−11.9%	37.45	1.0/km^{2}
Establés	32	45	−28.9%	52.27	0.6/km^{2}
Estriégana	11	18	−38.9%	16.19	0.7/km^{2}
Fontanar	2,633	2,321	+13.4%	15.49	170.0/km^{2}
Fuembellida	11	16	−31.2%	26.05	0.4/km^{2}
Fuencemillán	88	125	−29.6%	7.25	12.1/km^{2}
Fuentelahiguera de Albatages	116	125	−7.2%	52.54	2.2/km^{2}
Fuentelencina	323	324	−0.3%	44.30	7.3/km^{2}
Fuentelsaz	92	108	−14.8%	40.41	2.3/km^{2}
Fuentelviejo	52	49	+6.1%	12.88	4.0/km^{2}
Fuentenovilla	607	623	−2.6%	37.34	16.3/km^{2}
Gajanejos	61	54	+13.0%	25.49	2.4/km^{2}
Galápagos	2,730	2,259	+20.8%	33.91	80.5/km^{2}
Galve de Sorbe	96	119	−19.3%	49.36	1.9/km^{2}
Gascueña de Bornova	31	61	−49.2%	26.52	1.2/km^{2}
Guadalajara†	88,886	84,404	+5.3%	235.49	377.5/km^{2}
Henche	85	101	−15.8%	23.05	3.7/km^{2}
Heras de Ayuso	228	232	−1.7%	10.24	22.3/km^{2}
Herrería	20	23	−13.0%	19.14	1.0/km^{2}
Hiendelaencina	115	148	−22.3%	19.22	6.0/km^{2}
Hijes	20	29	−31.0%	20.71	1.0/km^{2}
Hita	318	402	−20.9%	56.49	5.6/km^{2}
Hombrados	51	38	+34.2%	37.84	1.3/km^{2}
Hontoba	432	316	+36.7%	32.14	13.4/km^{2}
Horche	2,776	2,482	+11.8%	44.44	62.5/km^{2}
Hortezuela de Océn	40	65	−38.5%	19.89	2.0/km^{2}
La Huerce	56	56	0.0%	41.04	1.4/km^{2}
Huérmeces del Cerro	42	55	−23.6%	19.83	2.1/km^{2}
Huertahernando	56	61	−8.2%	51.32	1.1/km^{2}
Hueva	112	142	−21.1%	31.76	3.5/km^{2}
Humanes	1,730	1,587	+9.0%	48.02	36.0/km^{2}
Illana	896	879	+1.9%	70.33	12.7/km^{2}
Iniéstola	18	22	−18.2%	10.05	1.8/km^{2}
Las Inviernas	58	80	−27.5%	34.09	1.7/km^{2}
Irueste	68	62	+9.7%	14.25	4.8/km^{2}
Jadraque	1,437	1,646	−12.7%	38.98	36.9/km^{2}
Jirueque	49	71	−31.0%	10.58	4.6/km^{2}
Ledanca	107	111	−3.6%	47.32	2.3/km^{2}
Loranca de Tajuña	1,512	1,368	+10.5%	36.40	41.5/km^{2}
Lupiana	296	270	+9.6%	30.92	9.6/km^{2}
Luzaga	68	92	−26.1%	29.70	2.3/km^{2}
Luzón	63	78	−19.2%	56.98	1.1/km^{2}
Majaelrayo	53	60	−11.7%	54.94	1.0/km^{2}
Málaga del Fresno	174	202	−13.9%	24.04	7.2/km^{2}
Malaguilla	194	142	+36.6%	28.51	6.8/km^{2}
Mandayona	306	359	−14.8%	33.18	9.2/km^{2}
Mantiel	30	60	−50.0%	15.33	2.0/km^{2}
Maranchón	213	261	−18.4%	153.21	1.4/km^{2}
Marchamalo	8,276	6,405	+29.2%	30.90	267.8/km^{2}
Masegoso de Tajuña	74	84	−11.9%	17.39	4.3/km^{2}
Matarrubia	70	59	+18.6%	28.21	2.5/km^{2}
Matillas	105	159	−34.0%	10.52	10.0/km^{2}
Mazarete	27	49	−44.9%	56.17	0.5/km^{2}
Mazuecos	320	325	−1.5%	23.77	13.5/km^{2}
Medranda	68	97	−29.9%	11.44	5.9/km^{2}
Megina	32	48	−33.3%	27.89	1.1/km^{2}
Membrillera	95	119	−20.2%	38.33	2.5/km^{2}
Miedes de Atienza	58	77	−24.7%	42.99	1.3/km^{2}
La Mierla	40	37	+8.1%	19.82	2.0/km^{2}
Millana	117	147	−20.4%	27.81	4.2/km^{2}
Milmarcos	70	111	−36.9%	43.91	1.6/km^{2}
La Miñosa	30	40	−25.0%	44.00	0.7/km^{2}
Mirabueno	90	98	−8.2%	19.46	4.6/km^{2}
Miralrío	56	89	−37.1%	8.21	6.8/km^{2}
Mochales	40	62	−35.5%	32.65	1.2/km^{2}
Mohernando	181	203	−10.8%	26.35	6.9/km^{2}
Molina de Aragón	3,331	3,641	−8.5%	168.33	19.8/km^{2}
Monasterio	15	19	−21.1%	21.47	0.7/km^{2}
Mondéjar	2,858	2,724	+4.9%	48.43	59.0/km^{2}
Montarrón	30	31	−3.2%	11.17	2.7/km^{2}
Moratilla de los Meleros	109	135	−19.3%	29.15	3.7/km^{2}
Morenilla	55	47	+17.0%	28.37	1.9/km^{2}
Muduex	110	114	−3.5%	22.23	4.9/km^{2}
Las Navas de Jadraque	37	31	+19.4%	9.03	4.1/km^{2}
Negredo	13	27	−51.9%	18.34	0.7/km^{2}
Ocentejo	16	25	−36.0%	30.95	0.5/km^{2}
El Olivar	88	138	−36.2%	17.27	5.1/km^{2}
Olmeda de Cobeta	61	80	−23.8%	39.62	1.5/km^{2}
La Olmeda de Jadraque	19	15	+26.7%	11.71	1.6/km^{2}
El Ordial	35	34	+2.9%	29.98	1.2/km^{2}
Orea	196	240	−18.3%	71.25	2.8/km^{2}
Pálmaces de Jadraque	47	62	−24.2%	29.41	1.6/km^{2}
Pardos	40	54	−25.9%	23.15	1.7/km^{2}
Paredes de Sigüenza	24	33	−27.3%	32.95	0.7/km^{2}
Pareja	466	529	−11.9%	91.60	5.1/km^{2}
Pastrana	923	1,062	−13.1%	95.70	9.6/km^{2}
El Pedregal	63	88	−28.4%	23.20	2.7/km^{2}
Peñalén	80	100	−20.0%	59.18	1.4/km^{2}
Peñalver	183	221	−17.2%	40.98	4.5/km^{2}
Peralejos de las Truchas	159	153	+3.9%	70.76	2.2/km^{2}
Peralveche	85	90	−5.6%	81.31	1.0/km^{2}
Pinilla de Jadraque	51	63	−19.0%	13.27	3.8/km^{2}
Pinilla de Molina	12	22	−45.5%	23.18	0.5/km^{2}
Pioz	5,263	3,510	+49.9%	19.42	271.0/km^{2}
Piqueras	35	60	−41.7%	32.31	1.1/km^{2}
El Pobo de Dueñas	100	141	−29.1%	55.28	1.8/km^{2}
Poveda de la Sierra	113	146	−22.6%	51.70	2.2/km^{2}
Pozo de Almoguera	114	122	−6.6%	16.72	6.8/km^{2}
Pozo de Guadalajara	1,628	1,309	+24.4%	11.81	137.8/km^{2}
Prádena de Atienza	56	43	+30.2%	28.86	1.9/km^{2}
Prados Redondos	53	96	−44.8%	53.43	1.0/km^{2}
Puebla de Beleña	54	57	−5.3%	29.15	1.9/km^{2}
Puebla de Valles	67	81	−17.3%	27.46	2.4/km^{2}
Quer	1,039	679	+53.0%	14.32	72.6/km^{2}
Rebollosa de Jadraque	10	15	−33.3%	7.67	1.3/km^{2}
El Recuenco	70	86	−18.6%	75.18	0.9/km^{2}
Renera	101	126	−19.8%	20.23	5.0/km^{2}
Retiendas	54	55	−1.8%	20.99	2.6/km^{2}
Riba de Saelices	103	126	−18.3%	66.68	1.5/km^{2}
Rillo de Gallo	46	61	−24.6%	25.90	1.8/km^{2}
Riofrío del Llano	64	45	+42.2%	42.93	1.5/km^{2}
Robledillo de Mohernando	181	128	+41.4%	29.65	6.1/km^{2}
Robledo de Corpes	47	71	−33.8%	41.11	1.1/km^{2}
Romanillos de Atienza	31	50	−38.0%	23.84	1.3/km^{2}
Romanones	116	126	−7.9%	28.88	4.0/km^{2}
Rueda de la Sierra	37	59	−37.3%	51.01	0.7/km^{2}
Sacecorbo	104	107	−2.8%	72.44	1.4/km^{2}
Sacedón	1,582	1,800	−12.1%	111.32	14.2/km^{2}
Saelices de la Sal	48	57	−15.8%	19.37	2.5/km^{2}
Salmerón	144	190	−24.2%	36.39	4.0/km^{2}
San Andrés del Congosto	76	94	−19.1%	15.27	5.0/km^{2}
San Andrés del Rey	39	38	+2.6%	14.71	2.7/km^{2}
Santiuste	16	24	−33.3%	10.53	1.5/km^{2}
Saúca	46	52	−11.5%	48.96	0.9/km^{2}
Sayatón	67	110	−39.1%	45.38	1.5/km^{2}
Selas	37	67	−44.8%	44.82	0.8/km^{2}
Semillas	29	39	−25.6%	49.91	0.6/km^{2}
Setiles	81	97	−16.5%	56.77	1.4/km^{2}
Sienes	47	65	−27.7%	29.50	1.6/km^{2}
Sigüenza	4,745	4,889	−2.9%	386.87	12.3/km^{2}
Solanillos del Extremo	86	106	−18.9%	34.83	2.5/km^{2}
Somolinos	28	36	−22.2%	14.78	1.9/km^{2}
El Sotillo	34	48	−29.2%	24.25	1.4/km^{2}
Sotodosos	29	45	−35.6%	28.95	1.0/km^{2}
Tamajón	149	180	−17.2%	116.28	1.3/km^{2}
Taragudo	52	42	+23.8%	6.42	8.1/km^{2}
Taravilla	42	46	−8.7%	60.68	0.7/km^{2}
Tartanedo	159	173	−8.1%	148.18	1.1/km^{2}
Tendilla	318	393	−19.1%	22.84	13.9/km^{2}
Terzaga	19	21	−9.5%	33.81	0.6/km^{2}
Tierzo	37	40	−7.5%	40.06	0.9/km^{2}
La Toba	74	109	−32.1%	36.60	2.0/km^{2}
Tordelrábano	16	61	−73.8%	11.62	1.4/km^{2}
Tordellego	43	16	+168.8%	33.47	1.3/km^{2}
Tordesilos	94	118	−20.3%	46.49	2.0/km^{2}
Torija	1,717	1,610	+6.6%	35.07	49.0/km^{2}
Torrecuadrada de Molina	19	24	−20.8%	35.80	0.5/km^{2}
Torrecuadradilla	29	33	−12.1%	32.88	0.9/km^{2}
Torre del Burgo	502	175	+186.9%	4.91	102.2/km^{2}
Torrejón del Rey	6,205	5,117	+21.3%	25.52	243.1/km^{2}
Torremocha de Jadraque	20	30	−33.3%	11.17	1.8/km^{2}
Torremocha del Campo	193	241	−19.9%	141.25	1.4/km^{2}
Torremocha del Pinar	35	48	−27.1%	50.47	0.7/km^{2}
Torremochuela	6	11	−45.5%	17.82	0.3/km^{2}
Torrubia	25	24	+4.2%	28.18	0.9/km^{2}
Tórtola de Henares	1,380	939	+47.0%	26.77	51.6/km^{2}
Tortuera	170	222	−23.4%	82.21	2.1/km^{2}
Tortuero	20	18	+11.1%	46.86	0.4/km^{2}
Traíd	22	33	−33.3%	48.59	0.5/km^{2}
Trijueque	1,569	1,378	+13.9%	35.63	44.0/km^{2}
Trillo	1,386	1,524	−9.1%	161.59	8.6/km^{2}
Uceda	3,152	2,601	+21.2%	46.77	67.4/km^{2}
Ujados	26	31	−16.1%	11.84	2.2/km^{2}
Utande	33	45	−26.7%	19.04	1.7/km^{2}
Valdarachas	46	37	+24.3%	9.69	4.7/km^{2}
Valdearenas	86	86	0.0%	15.44	5.6/km^{2}
Valdeavellano	107	93	+15.1%	24.02	4.5/km^{2}
Valdeaveruelo	1,208	1,077	+12.2%	17.25	70.0/km^{2}
Valdeconcha	47	42	+11.9%	23.47	2.0/km^{2}
Valdegrudas	51	68	−25.0%	13.92	3.7/km^{2}
Valdelcubo	38	71	−46.5%	13.83	2.7/km^{2}
Valdenuño Fernández	335	276	+21.4%	24.86	13.5/km^{2}
Valdepeñas de la Sierra	145	192	−24.5%	70.05	2.1/km^{2}
Valderrebollo	33	42	−21.4%	14.61	2.3/km^{2}
Valdesotos	29	25	+16.0%	27.30	1.1/km^{2}
Valfermoso de Tajuña	85	67	+26.9%	29.45	2.9/km^{2}
Valhermoso	23	39	−41.0%	29.09	0.8/km^{2}
Valtablado del Río	8	14	−42.9%	25.21	0.3/km^{2}
Valverde de los Arroyos	91	90	+1.1%	45.21	2.0/km^{2}
Viana de Jadraque	39	50	−22.0%	24.43	1.6/km^{2}
Villanueva de Alcorón	144	188	−23.4%	99.17	1.5/km^{2}
Villanueva de Argecilla	34	42	−19.0%	5.28	6.4/km^{2}
Villanueva de la Torre	6,616	6,351	+4.2%	11.21	590.2/km^{2}
Villares de Jadraque	50	61	−18.0%	17.20	2.9/km^{2}
Villaseca de Henares	25	34	−26.5%	17.19	1.5/km^{2}
Villaseca de Uceda	49	53	−7.5%	13.28	3.7/km^{2}
Villel de Mesa	164	224	−26.8%	37.10	4.4/km^{2}
Viñuelas	186	136	+36.8%	15.46	12.0/km^{2}
Yebes	5,201	2,099	+147.8%	17.49	297.4/km^{2}
Yebra	496	645	−23.1%	56.49	8.8/km^{2}
Yélamos de Abajo	59	69	−14.5%	12.46	4.7/km^{2}
Yélamos de Arriba	85	109	−22.0%	18.32	4.6/km^{2}
Yunquera de Henares	4,425	3,720	+19.0%	31.06	142.5/km^{2}
La Yunta	95	113	−15.9%	56.19	1.7/km^{2}
Zaorejas	116	155	−25.2%	189.14	0.6/km^{2}
Zarzuela de Jadraque	60	43	+39.5%	32.04	1.9/km^{2}
Zorita de los Canes	59	99	−40.4%	20.23	2.9/km^{2}
Province of Guadalajara	275,082	257,442	+6.9%	12,168.41	22.6/km^{2}
Castilla–La Mancha	2,084,086	2,106,331	−1.1%	79,410.62	26.2/km^{2}
Spain	48,085,361	46,815,916	+2.7%	504,755.17	95.3/km^{2}

== See also ==
- Geography of Spain
- List of municipalities of Spain
