= Montarrón =

- Municipality
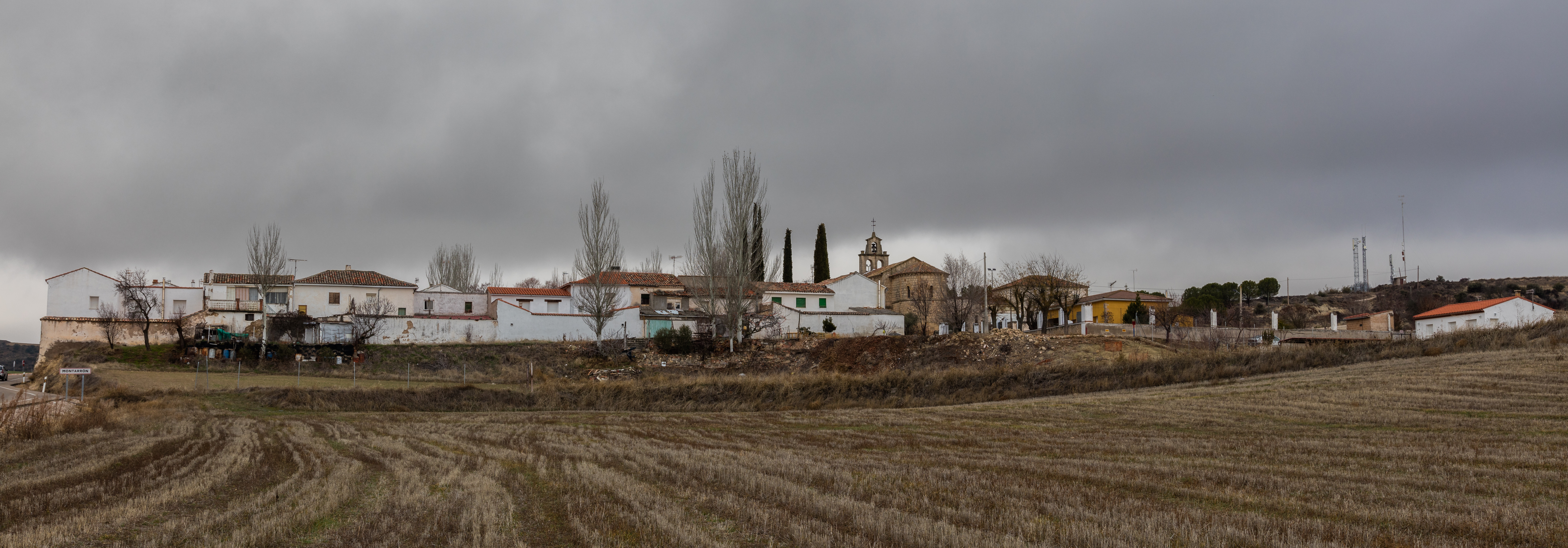

- Coat of arms

- Location within Province of Guadalajara Location within Castilla-La Mancha Location within Spain
- Country: Spain
- Autonomous community: Castilla–La Mancha
- Province: Guadalajara

Area
  - Total: 11 km^{2} (4.2 sq mi)

Population (2025-01-01)
  - Total: 31
  - Density: 2.8/km^{2} (7.3/sq mi)
- Time zone: UTC+1 (CET)
  - Summer (DST): UTC+2 (CEST)

Montarrón is a municipality of Spain located in the province of Guadalajara, Castile-La Mancha. As of 2004, it had a registered population of 44 (INE).

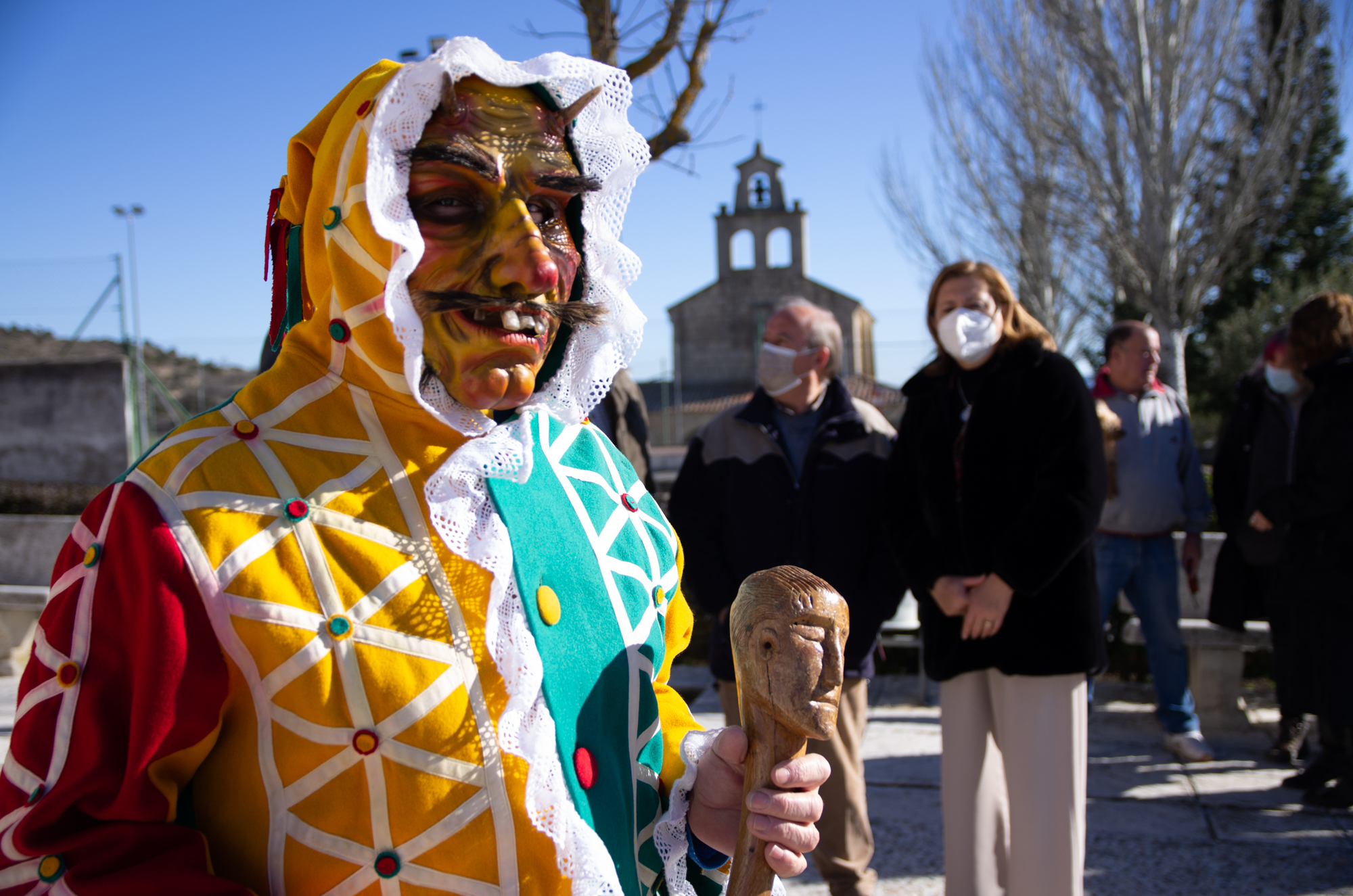
Local Botargas, a folk tradition proposed for immaterial BIC

== See also ==
- List of municipalities in Guadalajara
