= Villanueva de Argecilla =

Villanueva de Argecilla, Spain
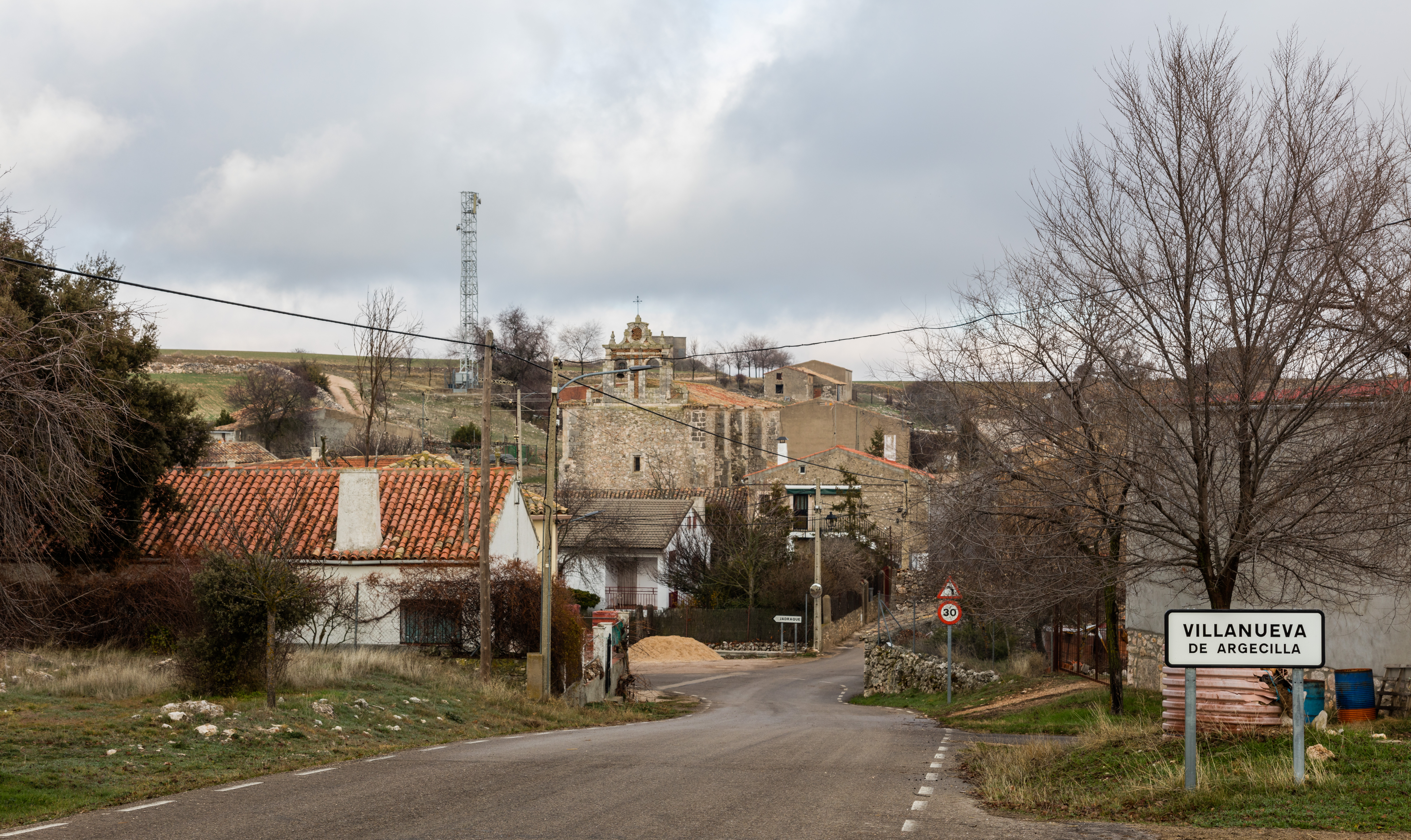

- Flag Coat of arms

- Location within Province of Guadalajara Location within Castilla-La Mancha Location within Spain
- Coordinates: 40°54′11″N 2°54′46″W
- Country: Spain
- Autonomous community: Castile-La Mancha
- Province: Guadalajara
- Municipality: Villanueva de Argecilla

Area
  - Total: 5 km^{2} (1.9 sq mi)

Population (2025-01-01)
  - Total: 30
  - Density: 6.0/km^{2} (16/sq mi)
- Time zone: UTC+1 (CET)
  - Summer (DST): UTC+2 (CEST)

Villanueva de Argecilla (Spanish: Villanueva de Argecilla) — is a municipality located in the province of Guadalajara, Castile-La Mancha, Spain. According to the 2004 census (INE), the municipality has a population of 48 inhabitants.
