= Anquela del Pedregal =

Municipality in Castile-La Mancha, Spain

Anquela del Pedregal, Spain
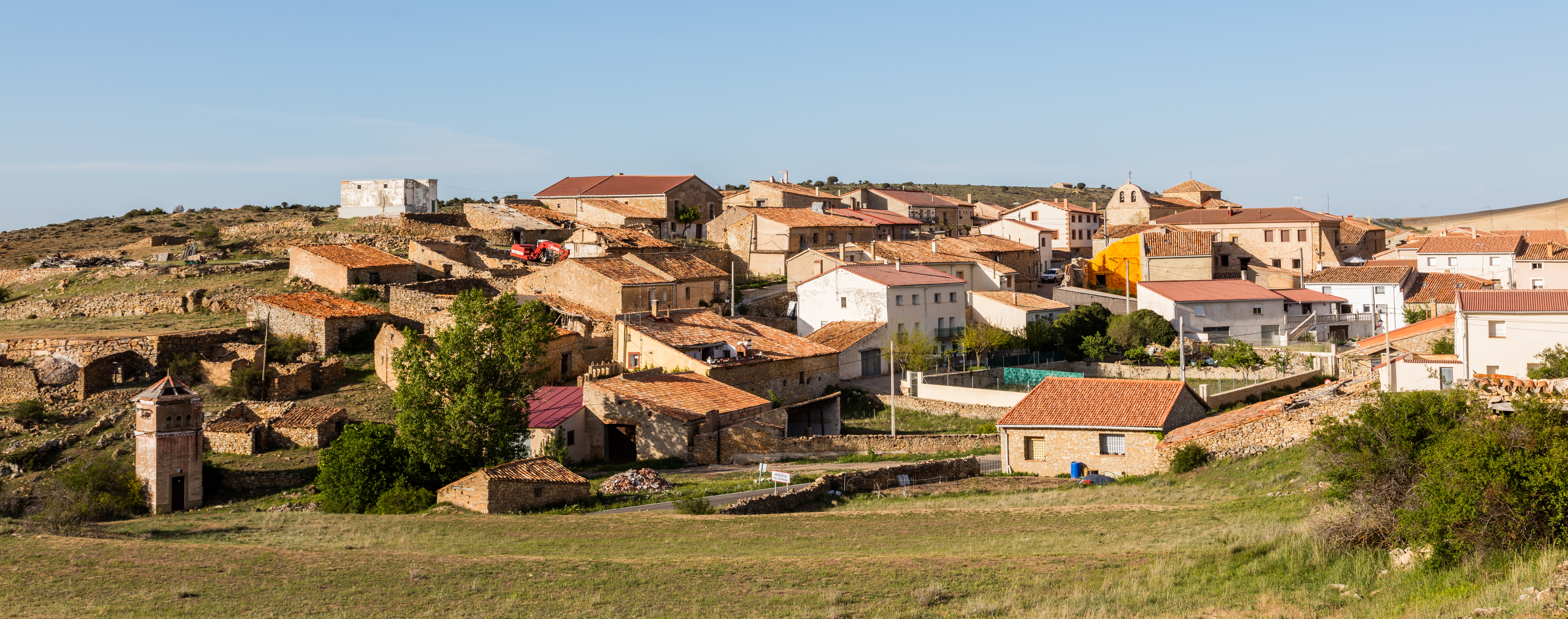

- Location within Province of Guadalajara Location within Castilla-La Mancha Location within Spain
- Coordinates: 40°44′40″N 1°44′8″W
- Country: Spain
- Autonomous community: Castile-La Mancha
- Province: Guadalajara
- Municipality: Anquela del Pedregal

Area
  - Total: 38 km^{2} (15 sq mi)

Population (2025-01-01)
  - Total: 28
  - Density: 0.74/km^{2} (1.9/sq mi)
- Time zone: UTC+1 (CET)
  - Summer (DST): UTC+2 (CEST)

Anquela del Pedregal is a municipality located in the province of Guadalajara, Castile-La Mancha, Spain. According to the 2004 census (INE), the municipality has a population of 22 inhabitants.
