= Saelices de la Sal =

Saelices de la Sal, Spain
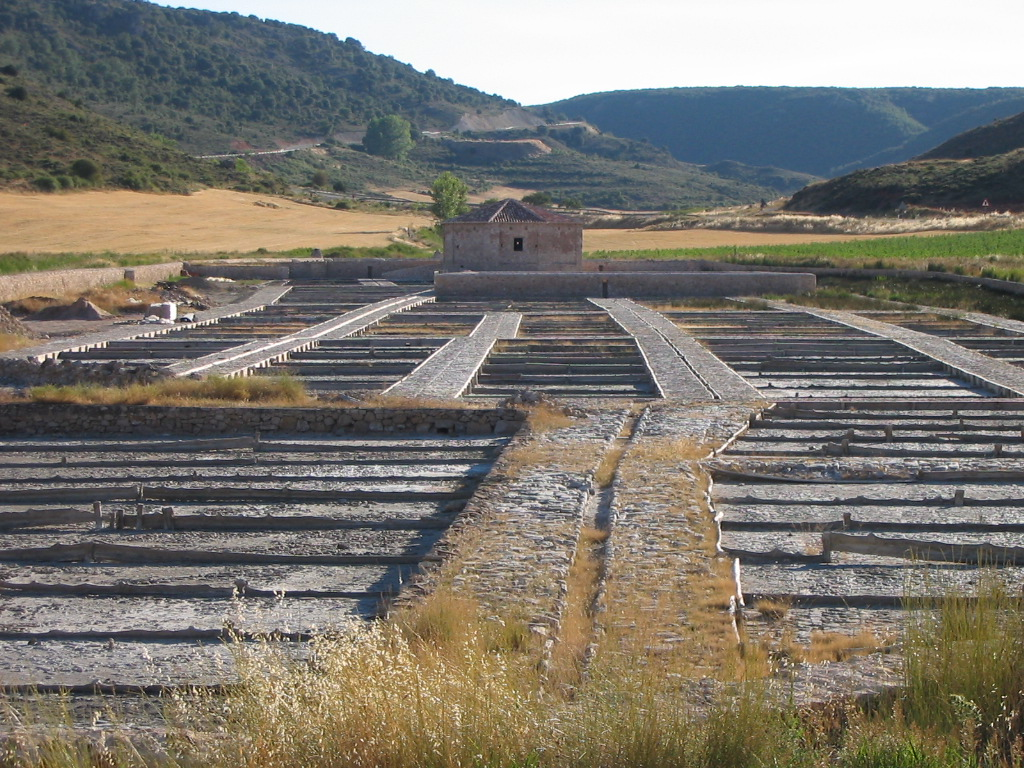

- Location within Province of Guadalajara Location within Castilla-La Mancha Location within Spain
- Coordinates: 40°54′29″N 2°19′16″W
- Country: Spain
- Autonomous community: Castile-La Mancha
- Province: Guadalajara
- Municipality: Saelices de la Sal

Area
  - Total: 19 km^{2} (7.3 sq mi)

Population (2025-01-01)
  - Total: 41
  - Density: 2.2/km^{2} (5.6/sq mi)
- Time zone: UTC+1 (CET)
  - Summer (DST): UTC+2 (CEST)

Saelices de la Sal is a municipality located in the province of Guadalajara, Castile-La Mancha, Spain.

The municipality derives its name from its historic salt works, with records of salt extraction in the area dating back to 1203. The salt works were damaged during the Spanish Civil War, but in 2023, Minister of Education, Culture and Sports Rosa Ana Rodríguez Perez announced that as part of restoration projects in the province of Guadalajara, the salt works would be allocated part of a 1.3 million euro budget for restoration works.

According to the 2025 census (INE), the municipality has a population of 41 inhabitants.
