= Valdeconcha =

Valdeconcha, Spain
- Flag Coat of arms

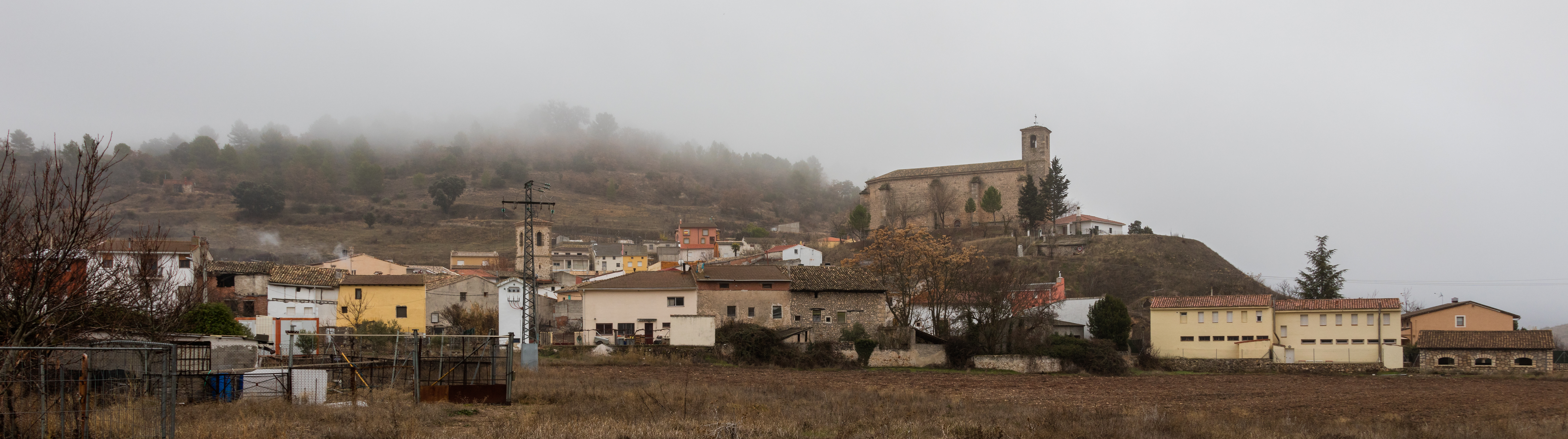

- Location within Province of Guadalajara Location within Castilla-La Mancha Location within Spain
- Coordinates: 40°27′22″N 2°52′36″W
- Country: Spain
- Autonomous community: Castile-La Mancha
- Province: Guadalajara
- Municipality: Valdeconcha

Area
  - Total: 23 km^{2} (8.9 sq mi)

Population (2025-01-01)
  - Total: 42
  - Density: 1.8/km^{2} (4.7/sq mi)
- Time zone: UTC+1 (CET)
  - Summer (DST): UTC+2 (CEST)

Valdeconcha is a municipality in the province of Guadalajara, Castile-La Mancha, Spain. According to the 2018 census (INE), it had a population of 40.
