= Armallones =

Armallones, Spain
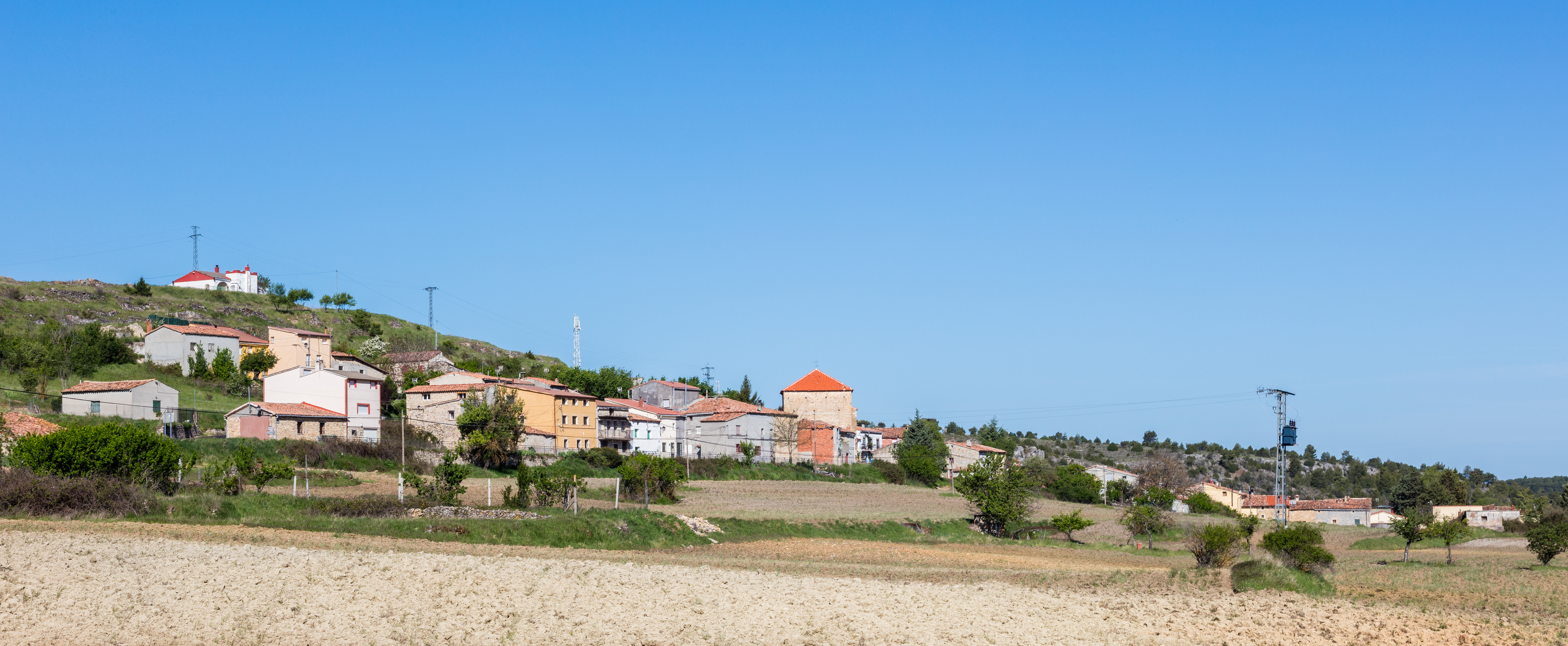

- Coat of arms

- Location within Province of Guadalajara Location within Castilla-La Mancha Location within Spain
- Coordinates: 40°44′16″N 2°18′9″W
- Country: Spain
- Autonomous community: Castile-La Mancha
- Province: Guadalajara
- Municipality: Armallones

Area
  - Total: 77.18 km^{2} (29.80 sq mi)
- Elevation: 1,206 m (3,957 ft)

Population (2025-01-01)
  - Total: 52
  - Density: 0.67/km^{2} (1.7/sq mi)
- Time zone: UTC+1 (CET)
  - Summer (DST): UTC+2 (CEST)

Armallones is a municipality located in the province of Guadalajara, Castile-La Mancha, Spain. According to the 2004 census (INE), the municipality had a population of 61 inhabitants.
