= Bañuelos =

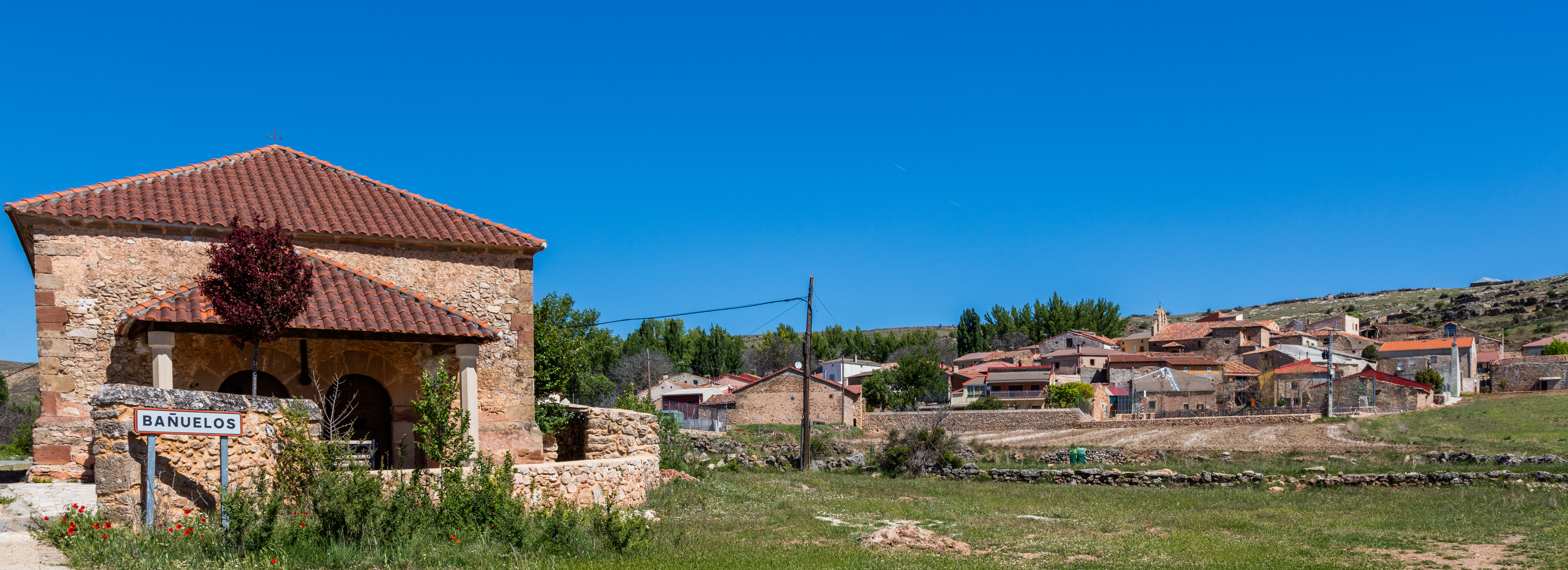

- Bañuelos within Guadalajara

- Location within Province of Guadalajara Location within Castilla-La Mancha Location within Spain
- Coordinates: 41°17′14″N 2°54′46″W
- Country: Spain
- Autonomous community: Castile-La Mancha
- Province: Guadalajara
- Municipality: Bañuelos

Area
  - Total: 18 km^{2} (6.9 sq mi)

Population (2025-01-01)
  - Total: 10
  - Density: 0.56/km^{2} (1.4/sq mi)
- Time zone: UTC+1 (CET)
  - Summer (DST): UTC+2 (CEST)

Bañuelos is a municipality located in the province of Guadalajara, Castile-La Mancha, Spain. According to the 2023 census, the municipality has a population of 13 inhabitants.
