= Luzón =

- Municipality
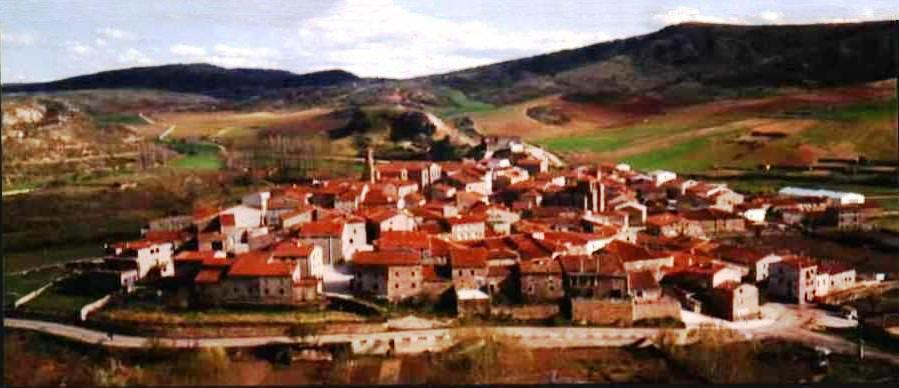

- Coat of arms

- Location within Spain Location within Castilla-La Mancha Location within Province of Guadalajara
- Coordinates: 41°1′37″N 2°16′32″W
- Country: Spain
- Autonomous community: Castilla–La Mancha
- Province: Guadalajara

Area
  - Total: 56.98 km^{2} (22.00 sq mi)
- Elevation: 1,176 m (3,858 ft)

Population (2025-01-01)
  - Total: 50
  - Density: 0.88/km^{2} (2.3/sq mi)
- Demonym: Luzonero/Luzonera or Luzonense
- Time zone: UTC+1 (CET)
  - Summer (DST): UTC+2 (CEST)
- Postal code: 19285

Luzón is a municipality of Spain located in the province of Guadalajara, in the autonomous community of Castile-La Mancha. According to the 2012 census of the INE, the municipality has a population of only 79 inhabitants, having undergone a severe population decline since the last half of the twentieth century.

== Location ==
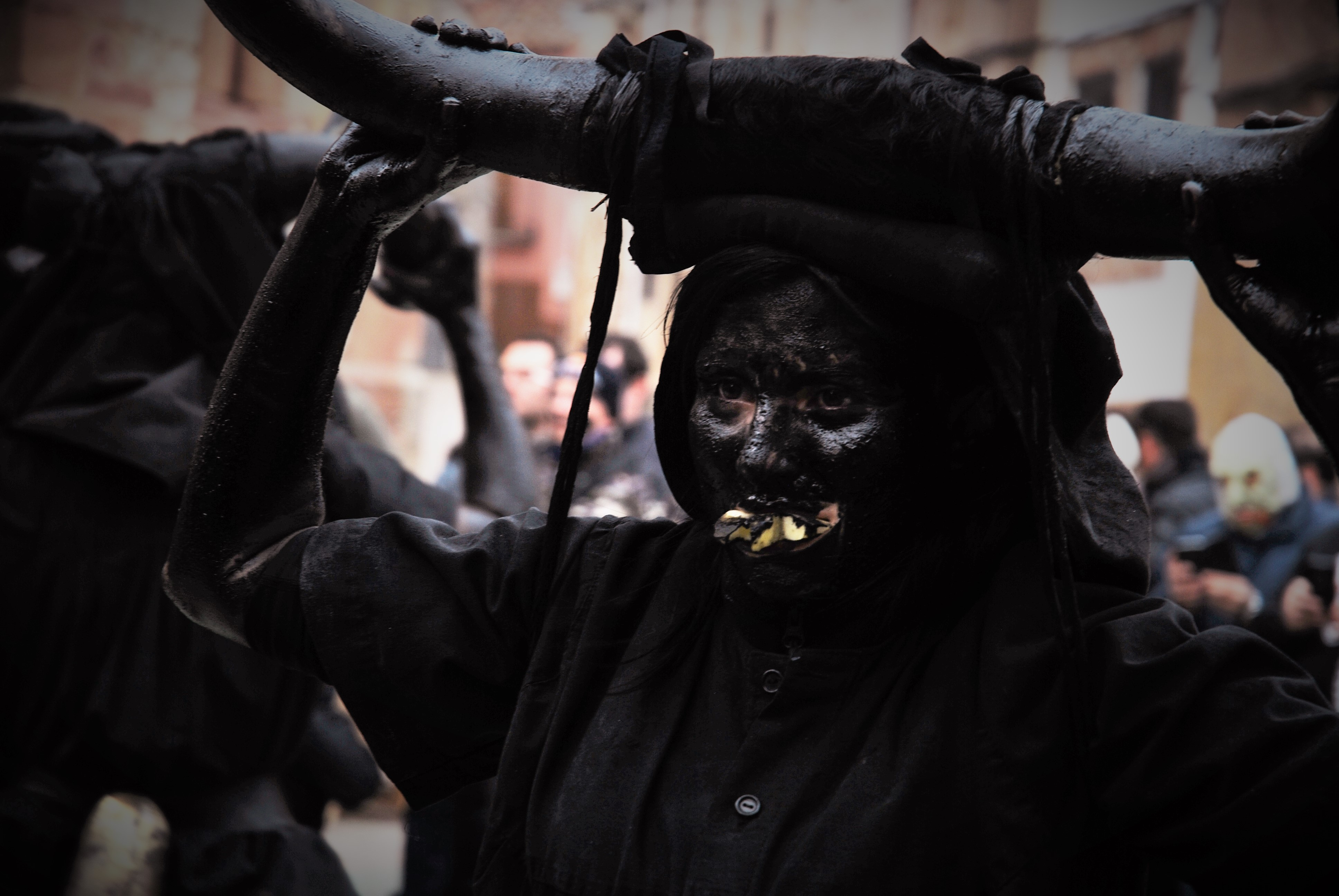
During the carnival locals traditionally dress up as demons.

Luzón is located on top of a small hillock peaked by the parish church which is dedicated to Saint Peter the Apostle and belongs to the Roman Catholic Diocese of Sigüenza-Guadalajara.

This town lies within the Tajuña river valley, at the feet of the Sierra de Solorio range of the Sistema Ibérico mountain ranges. The nearest towns are Anguita to the west and Maranchón to the east.

== See also ==
- List of municipalities in Guadalajara
