= Clares =

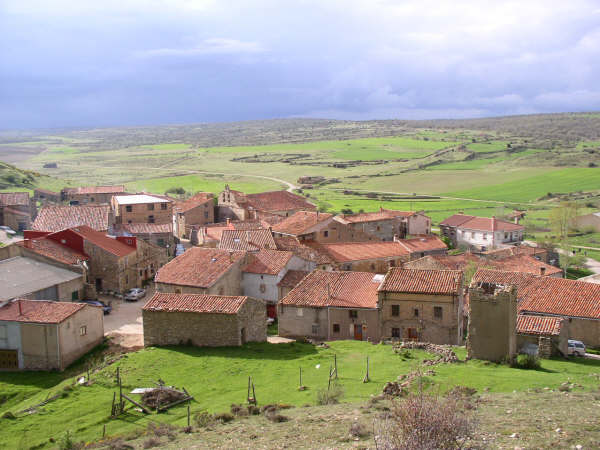
- View of Clares in 2007
- Coordinates: 41.0351°N 2.1427°W
- Country: Spain
- Autonomous community: Castile-La Mancha
- Province: Guadalajara
- Municipality: Maranchón

Area
  - Total: 17.2 km^{2} (6.6 sq mi)
- Elevation: 1,281 m (4,203 ft)

Population (2021)
  - Total: 8
  - Density: 0.47/km^{2} (1.2/sq mi)
- Time zone: UTC+1 (CET)
  - Summer (DST): UTC+2 (CEST)
- Website: soydeclares.es

Clares is a small village in the Guadalajara province, incorporated since 1969 in the Maranchón municipality, belonging to the Señorio de Molina-Alto Tajo region in the autonomous community of Castilla-La Mancha, Spain.

== Geography ==
=== Location ===
Clares is in the north of the Guadalajara province, 108 km from the provincial capital.

=== Demography ===
The population, as of 1 January 2021, is of 8 inhabitants.

=== Climate ===
The annual average temperature is 8-10 °C, and the average temperature of the hottest month in the summer is less than 25 °C. The total annual amount of precipitation is about 500 mm, with two peaks in spring and autumn.

=== Orography ===
Clares' highest point is the Alto del Monte (1362 m), and its lowest point is in Valdeclares (1280 m). The origin of the Tajuña River is near the village.

=== Flora ===
Clares belongs to the Praramera de Maranchón.

== Traditional Celebrations ==
- Burning of "el Judas"
- Virgen del Lluvio (Virgin of the Rain)
- San Roque
- Virgen del Rosario (Virgin of the Rosary)
- El Ojeo (the beating)

== Interesting buildings ==
- Local Church
- Ermita de San Roque
- Ermita de la Virgen del Lluvio
- Bread oven

== How to get to Clares ==
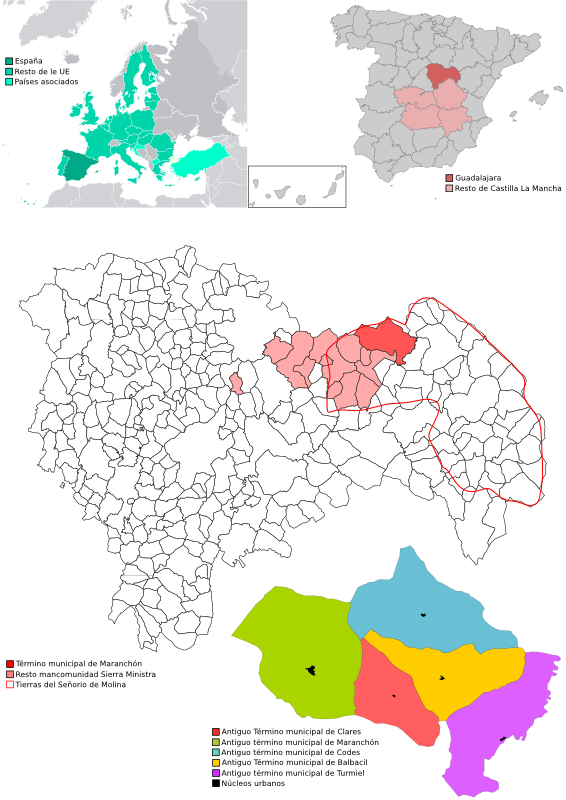
Ubication of Clares

=== By Car ===
Take exit 135 on road A-2, then enter N211 and continue there 21 km until you reach Maranchón. Then you take road GU-408 to Clares / Codes / Balbacil / Valle del Mesa. Then, 700m later, take GU-407 to Clares / Balbacil. Finally, take the entrance to Clares.

=== By bus ===
The line Madrid / Guadalajara / Teruel / Valencia has a stop in Maranchón, 6 km from Clares.

=== By train ===
The nearest train stations are in Medinaceli (32 km, roads: SO-411, GU-411, N-211, GU-408 y GU-407) and in Arcos de Jalón (30 km, roads: SO-P-3009, GU-405, N-211, GU-408 y GU-407), both of them are on the Madrid - Zaragoza line.
