= Chinchón =

Municipality in Spain

- Municipality
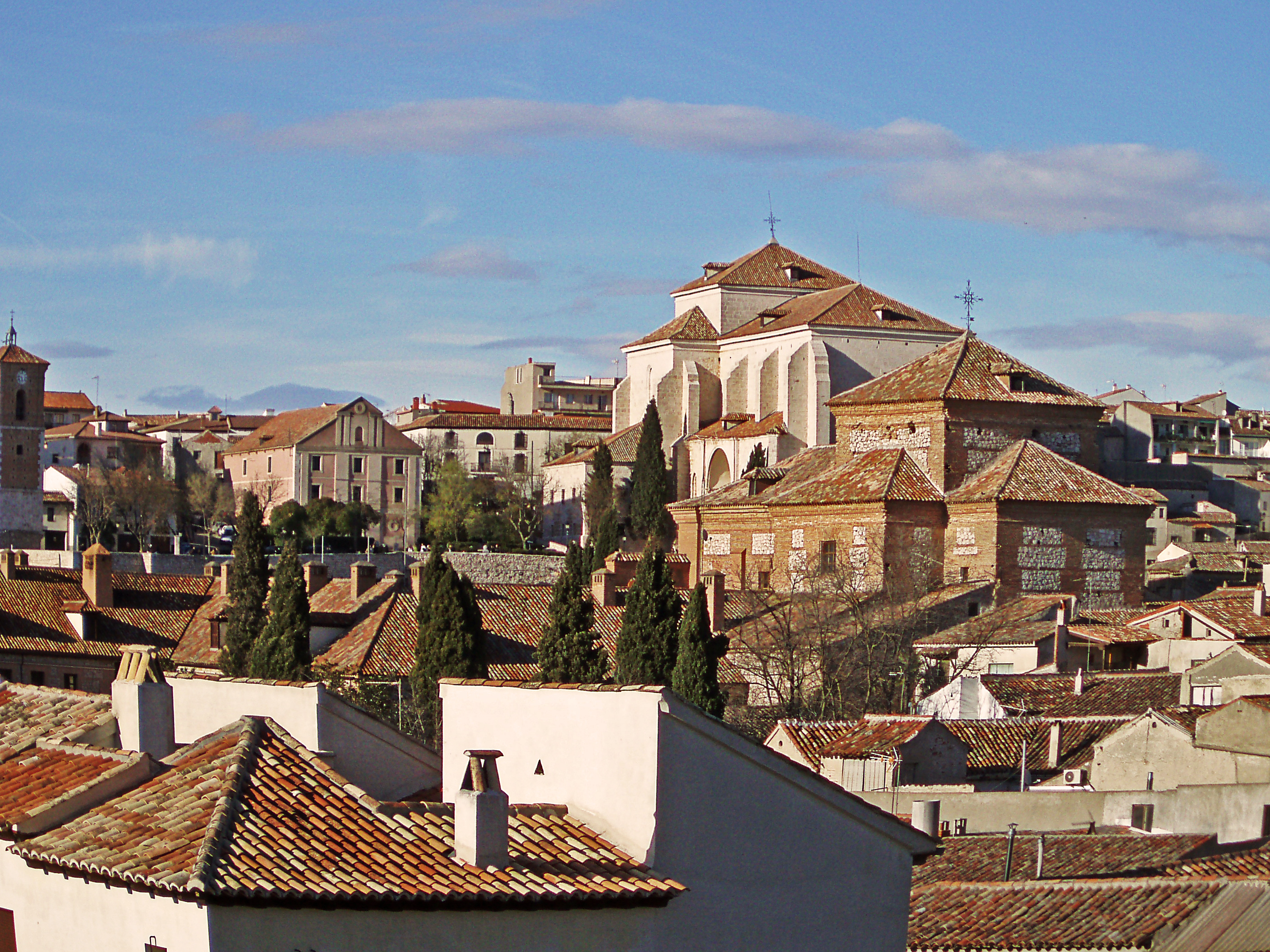

- Flag Coat of arms

- Location in Spain Chinchón (Spain)
- Coordinates: 40°8′22″N 3°25′35″W
- Country: Spain
- Region: Community of Madrid

Area
  - Total: 115.91 km^{2} (44.75 sq mi)
- Elevation: 753 m (2,470 ft)

Population (2025-01-01)
  - Total: 5,800
  - Density: 50/km^{2} (130/sq mi)
- Demonym: Chinchonete /-a
- Time zone: UTC+1 (CET)
  - Summer (DST): UTC+2 (CEST)
- Postal code: 28370
- Website: Official website

Spanish Cultural Heritage
- Type: Non-movable
- Criteria: Historic ensemble
- Designated: 14 June 1974
- Reference no.: RI-53-0000174

Chinchón (Spanish: [tʃinˈtʃon]) is a town and municipality in the Community of Madrid, Spain. Located 50 km south-east of the city of Madrid, the municipality covers an area of 115.91 km^{2}. As of 2018, it has a population of 5,239. Its historic centre, with a notable main square, was declared a Heritage Site in 1974.

== Heritage ==
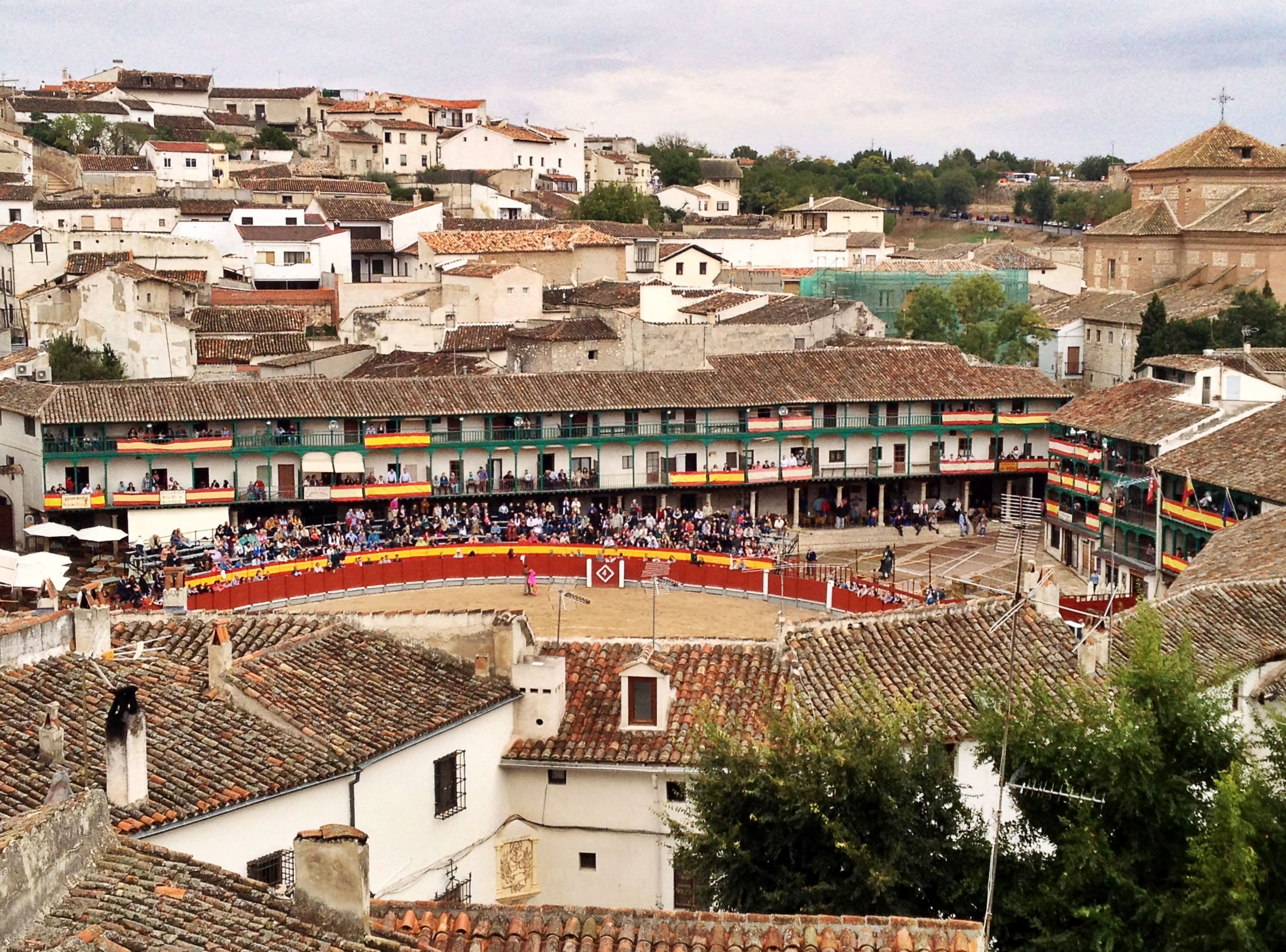
The main square from the Mirador

=== Plaza Mayor ===
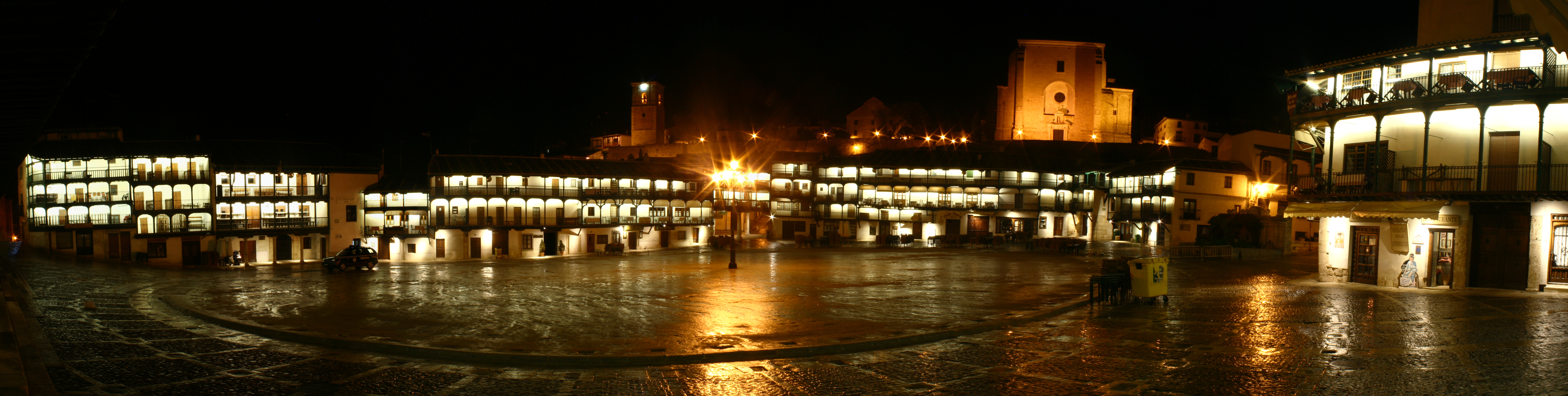
Chinchón's Plaza Mayor is an example of popular architecture. The first houses with arcades and balconies were built in the 15th century, and it was completely closed in the 17th century.

It has an irregular shape in plan with a simple and orderly structure in elevation. The buildings have three floors, with lintelled galleries and 234 wooden balconies called claros, supported by upright wooden pillars.

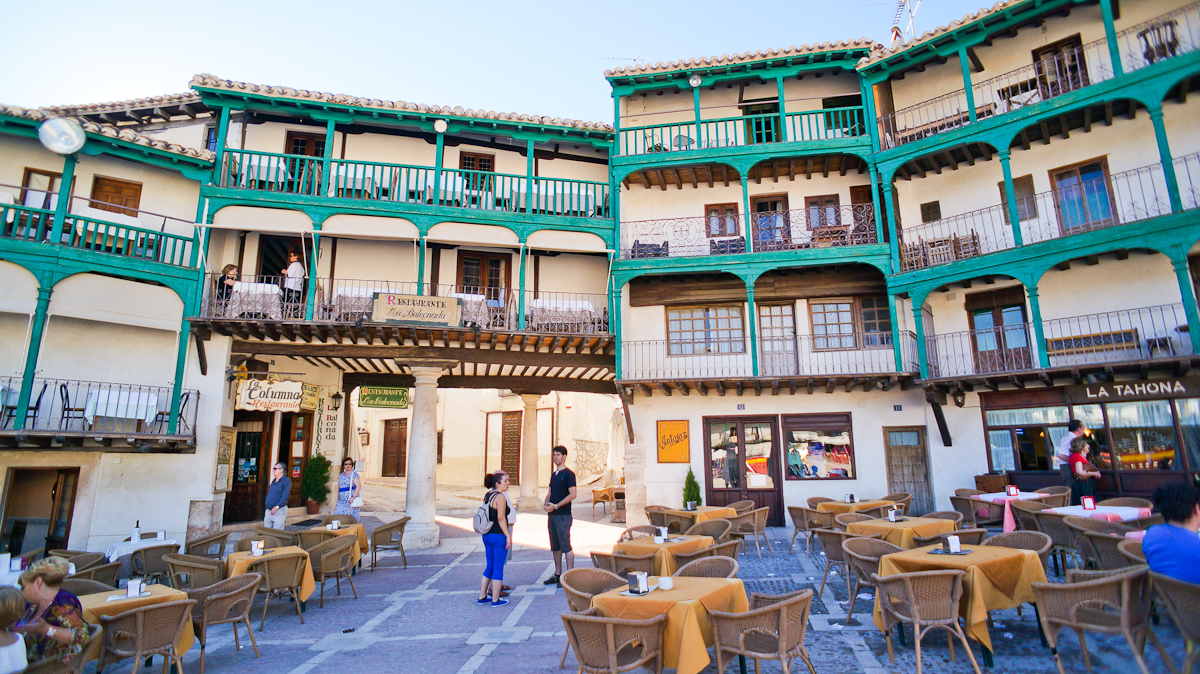
Corner of the main square

Since its construction, the square has hosted numerous activities: royal festivals, proclamations, theatre (corral de comedias), games, bullfights, executions, autos sacramentales, religious political and military events, in addition to serving as a film set (e.g. the bullfighting scene of the film Around the World in Eighty Days). In 1992 a referendum was called on the question of recovering the blue colour that the square wore since the 17th century until recent times, as proposed by the architect Salvador Pérez Arroyo. The Chinchoneses approached the City Council to vote in an informal referendum in which the colour green triumphed, since it was the colour that the inhabitants had always known in their lifetime.

=== Church of Our Lady of the Assumption ===
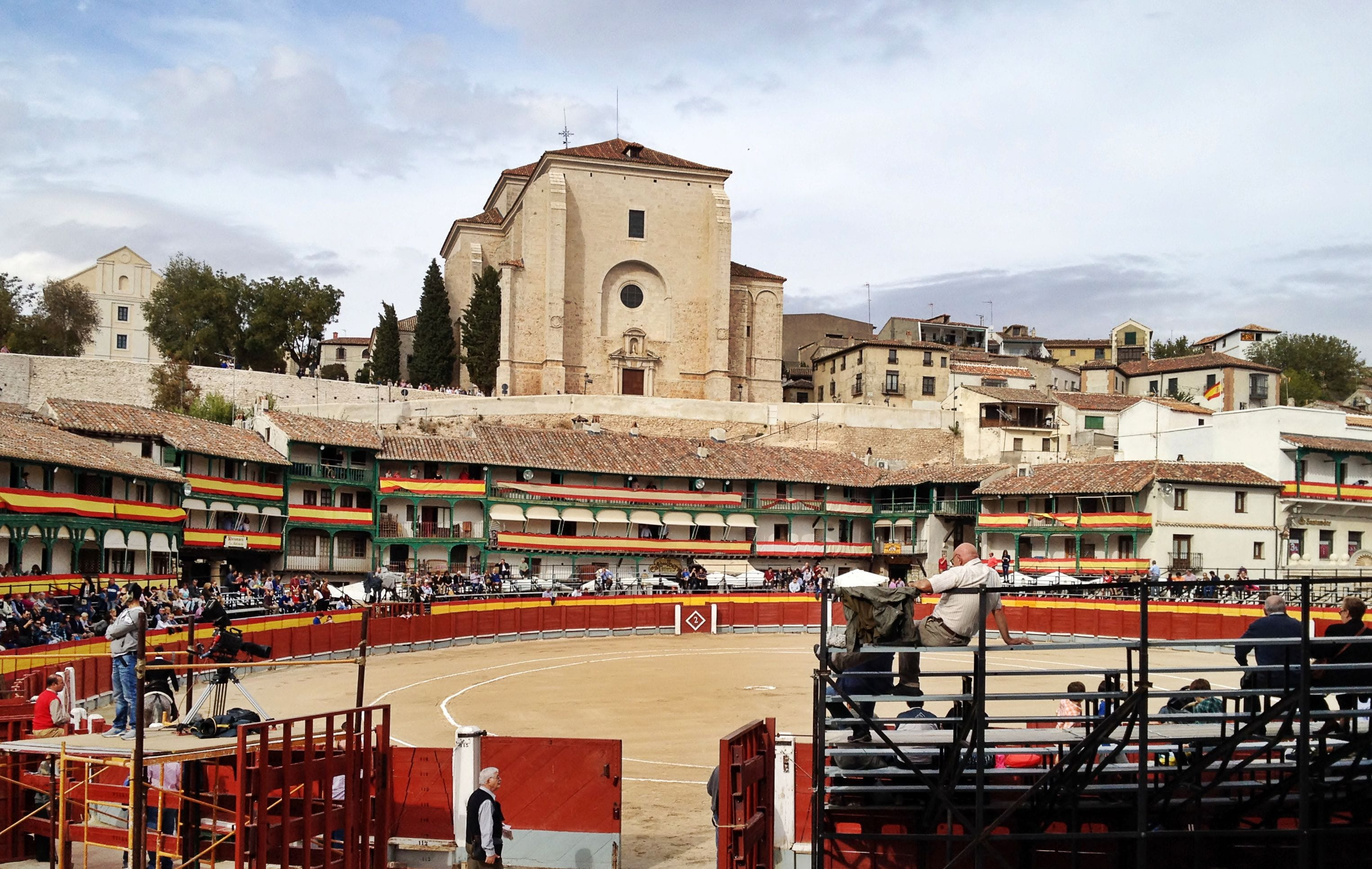
The church soaring above the main square

Its construction began in 1534 as a chapel attached to the Count's palace with a Gothic architecture project, by Alonso de Covarrubias, and it was finished in 1626, after a forty-eight year halt in the works. The counts of Chinchón would only finance the church with three conditions, namely: having a privileged view at mass, displaying the county coats of arms on the main façade and that all the counts would be buried in the church, below the altar; and it took forty-eight years for the agreement to be established. Diego Fernández de Cabrera, third Count of Chinchón and steward of Felipe II and his Council of State, hired the best masters who had worked in El Escorial. In 1808 the French troops set the church on fire, and it was restored twenty years later.

The current church combines the styles Gothic, Plateresque, Renaissance and Baroque. It is worth highlighting, in the centre of the main altarpiece, the magnificent painting of the Assumption of the Virgin painted around 1812 by the hand of Francisco de Goya, commissioned by his brother Camilo, chaplain of the counts.

=== Clock tower ===
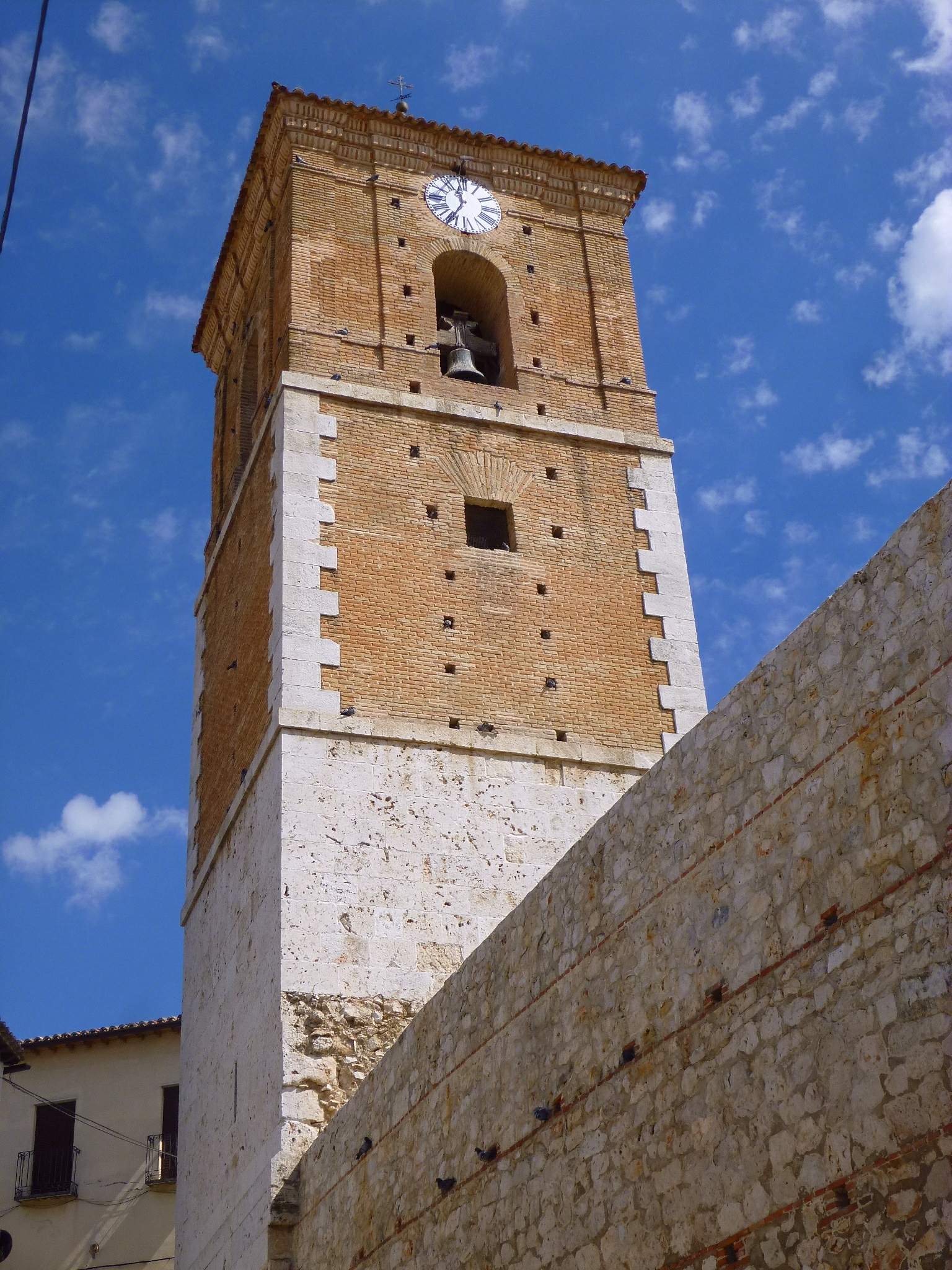

This tower was part of the old parish church of Nuestra Señora de Gracia, built before the 15th century. The church itself was destroyed by napoleonic troops in 1808. The void left by the missing building is now a small garden called El Mirador (the lookout), the surface of which is built on top of the debris caused by the destruction of the church, completely buried at the foot of the tower. The tower and its bells are still used for its traditional function, such as tolling on the passing of neighbours, or to announce religious acts and events. It also has a civil use since 1755 when a clock was installed, and still today chimes at the hours and half-hours.

=== Castle of the Counts ===
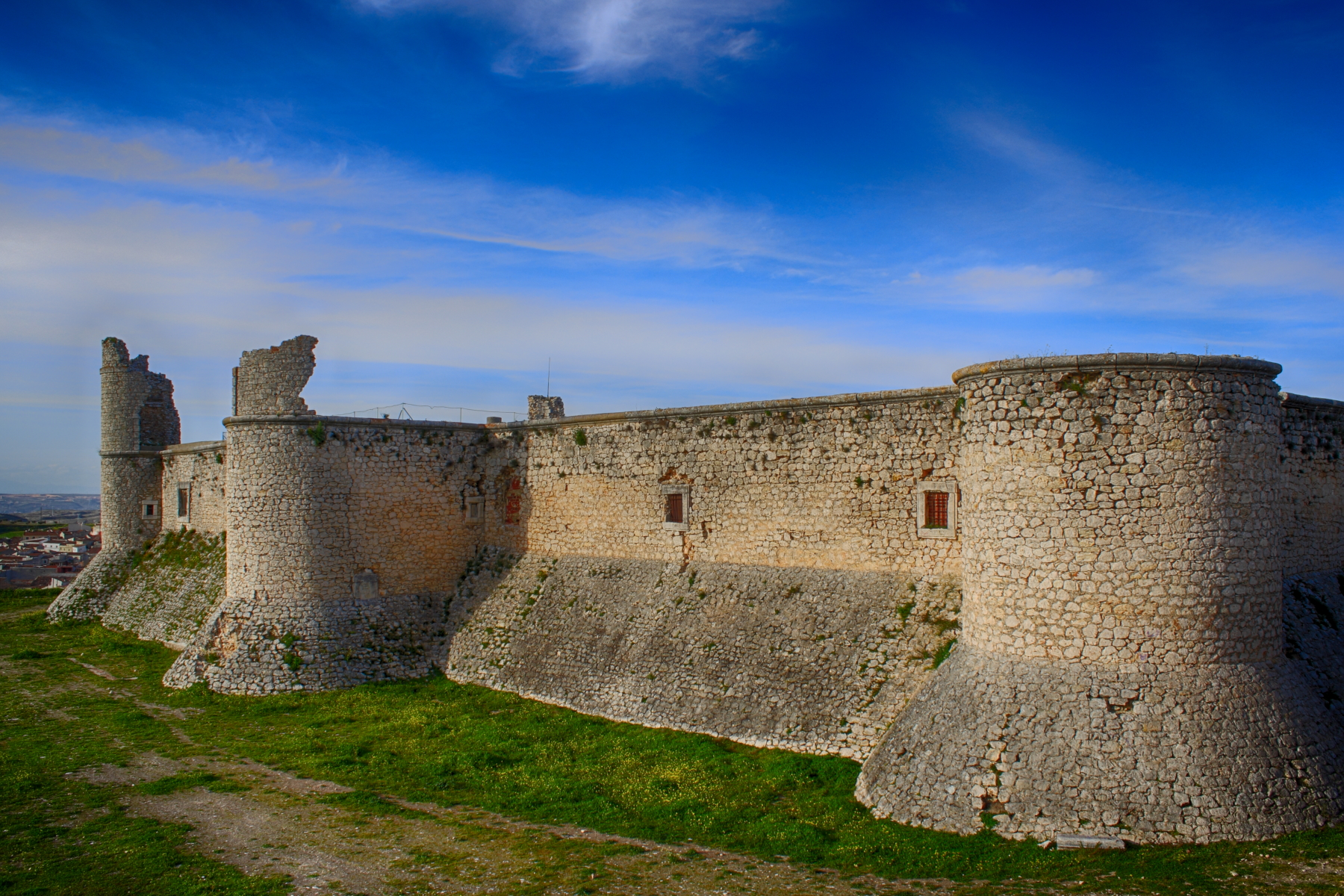

It was built at the end of the 15th century, although it was destroyed during the Revolt of the Comuneros in 1520. The 3rd Count of Chinchón, Diego Fernández de Cabrera, decided to rebuild it in the second half of the 16th century. Its appearance is in line with Renaissance architecture. Robust and very horizontal, it sought to avoid enemy artillery fire. The sloping walls are intended to make access difficult for sappers. The castle was abandoned in the 18th century after being the residence of the counts. The War of the Spanish Succession marked the beginning of its final deterioration as the imperial troops of the Marquis de la Mina besieged and after a fire. Later, in the Spanish War of Independence in 1808, the troops under General Victor also carried out plunder and burned the castle. Its last use was as a liquor factory in the 20th century, as well as serving as a film set in many occasions.

=== Convent of San Agustín ===
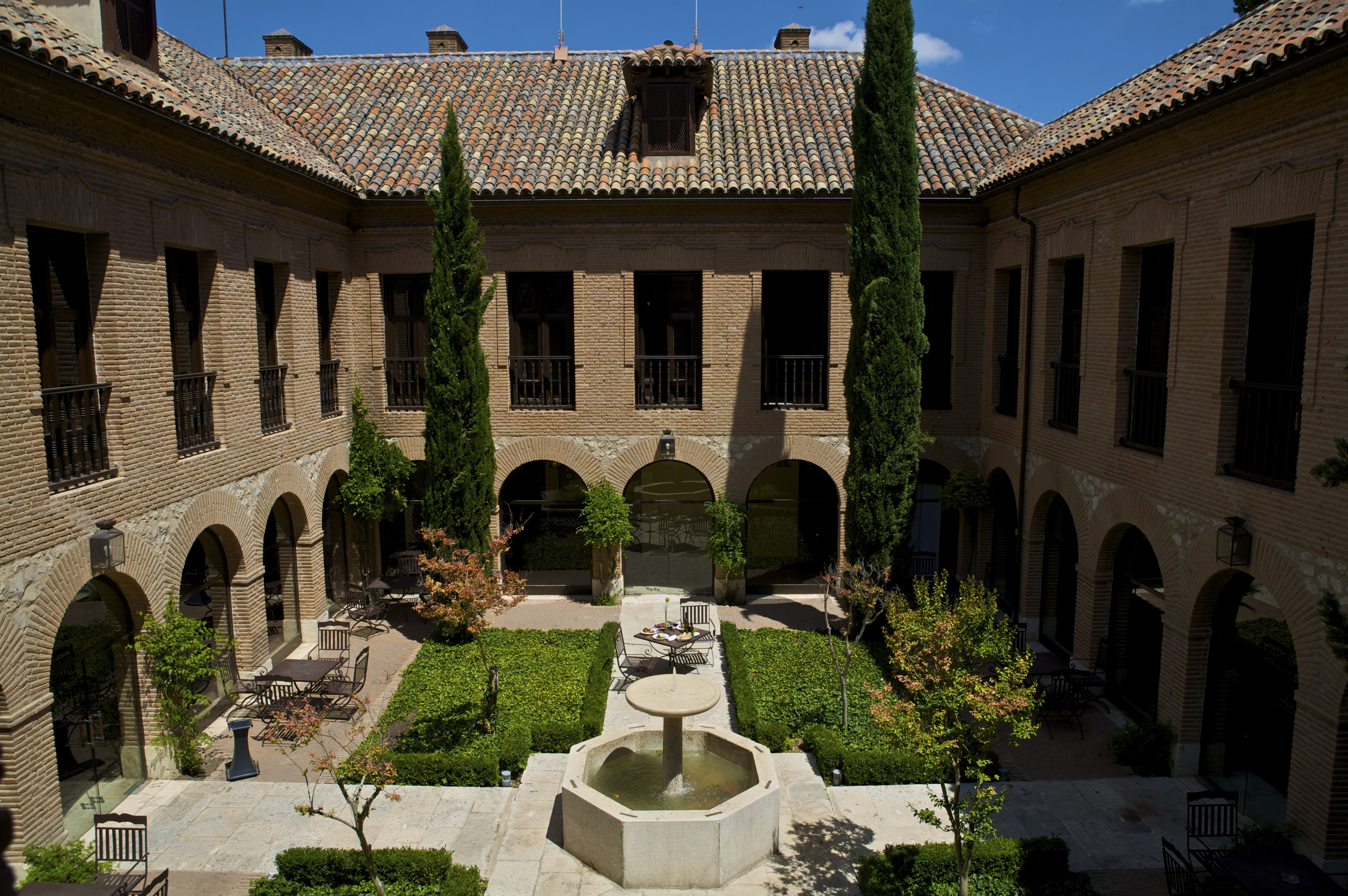

It currently houses the Parador of Chinchón, after having been rebuilt and restored by the architect Juan de Palazuelo in 1982 and after being donated by the Chinchón city council to the State. The first convent of Augustinians was founded at the end of the 15th century by Andrés de Cabrera and Beatriz de Bobadilla. The current one was built around 1626. During the War of the Succession the Archduke Charles of Austria stayed in it. During the 18th and 19th centuries it was a humanistic training center where theology, grammar and Latin were taught. After the confiscation of Mendizábal, in 1842, it became a court and prison for the judicial district. In the 20th century, the District and Investigation Courts were established. Its dependencies today make up the Parador and, in the case of the church, the hermitage of Nuestra Señora del Rosario.

=== Convent of the Poor Clares ===
It was founded in 1653 by the V Count of Chinchón, Don Francisco Fausto Fernández de Cabrera. The features of Spanish Baroque architecture are well defined, following the style of Juan de Herrera. The building is very austere, using materials such as brick and hand-sized stonework. The Pantheon of the V Counts of Chinchón is made of marble and is located in the choir of the Convent church. It was restored in 1995.

=== Castillo de Casasola ===
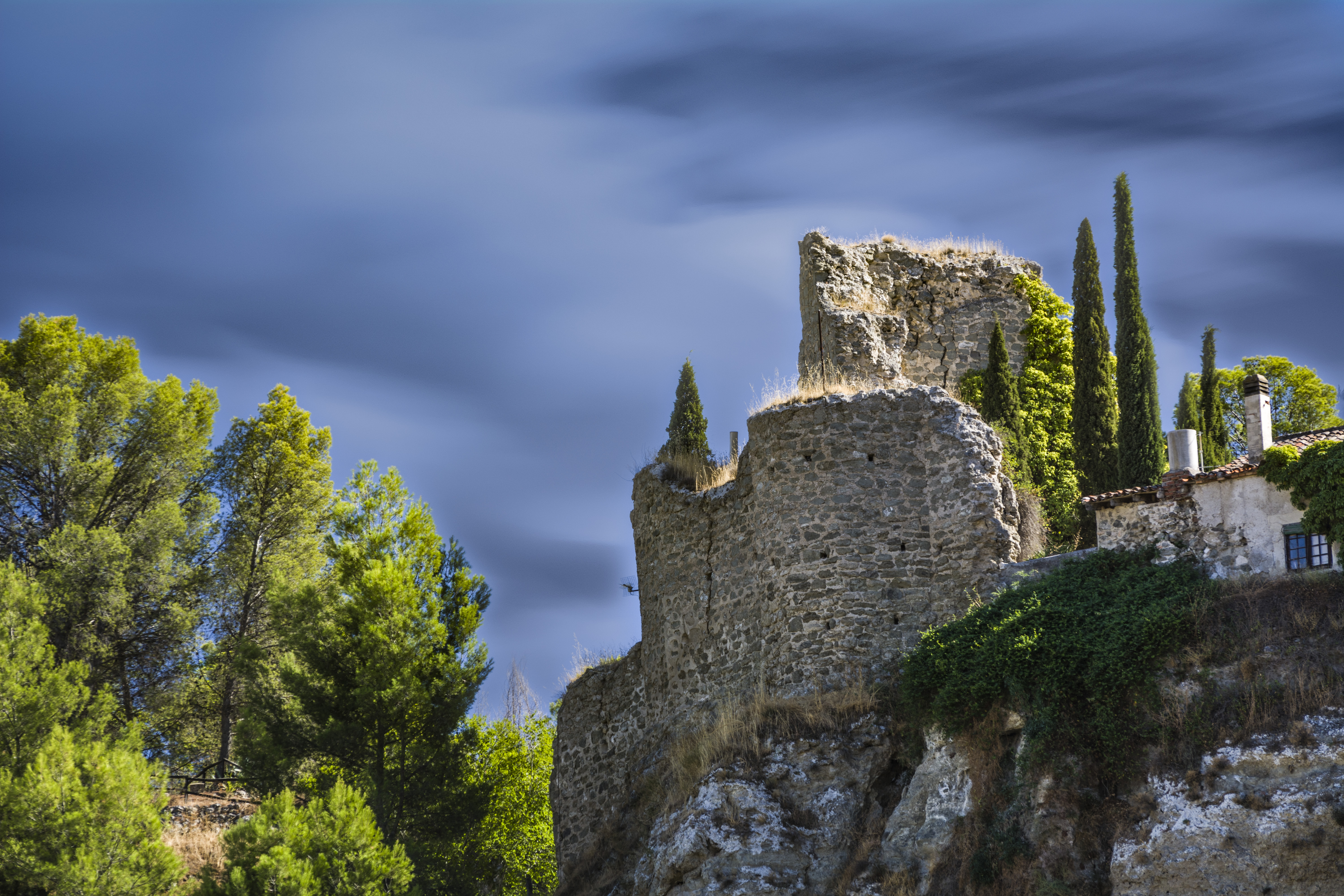
Castillo de Casasola

It is a ruined 15th century castle with a triangular plan near the river Tajuña. It has a stone bridge and several towers. In the 19th century it served as a base politicians and military who were favourable to Alfonso XII of Spain. It is in Gothic style and is now privately owned.

== History ==
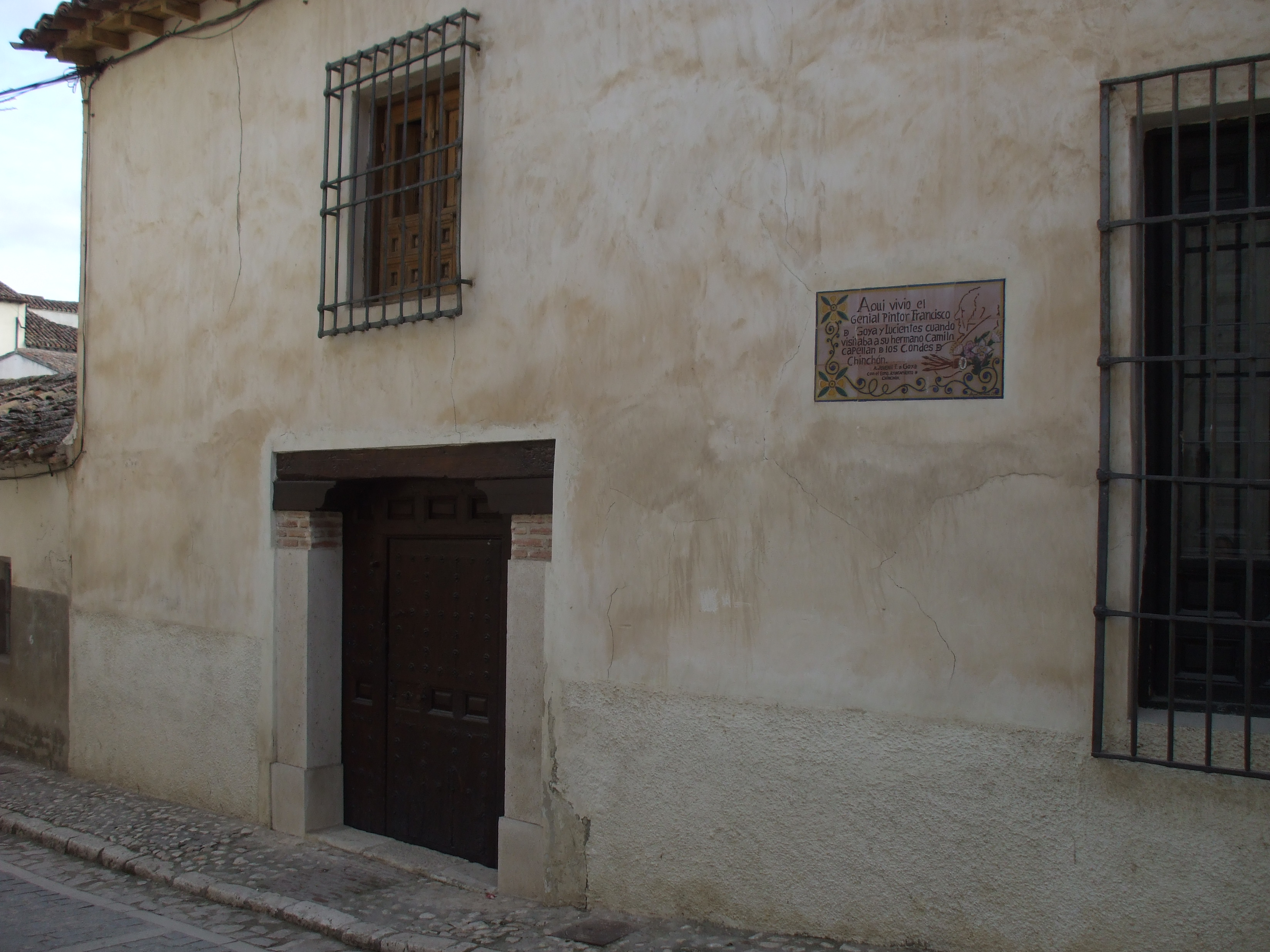
Goya's brother's house in Chinchón, where the painter stayed for long periods.

=== First settlements and foundation of the town ===
The fertile valley of the Tajuña river, and the Alcarria plains that dominate it from high up, have been inhabited from the Neolithic period, with multiple remains found in the many natural caves emerging from the slopes either side of the valley. Iberian villages and necropolis were formed from around the 6th century, as demonstrated e.g. by the excavations of Cerro del Salitral.

In Roman times farming became a well organized activity, judging by the roads and irrigation system that remain. The area was controlled from the military garrison of nearby Titulcia, which allowed for multiple small settlements to sprout along the valley and on the edges of the plains.

The area was part of Islamic Spain or Al-Andalus for three and a half centuries, from the first conquest in the 8th century until the mid 12th century. The town of Chinchón itself was founded in this period, approximately in the year 1000. It was a small citadel at the end of the ridge running along the northern part of the village of our days, above the present day Plaza mayor. Some of the ramparts are still visible, although it is difficult to distinguish the original stone walls from later reconstructions, or even from earlier Roman works.

Chinchón became a part of Castile in October 1139 when Alphonse VII took it for his Christian Kingdom. Initially it was a subsidiary locality of Segovia, governed by a medieval organization of Segovia nobility, the Quiñones, a combination of military order and agricultural enterprise designed to control frontier lands while keeping them in production.

=== From Dominion to Head of the County ===
In 1480, it was granted as a Dominion to the Marquises of Moya, Andrés de Cabrera and Beatriz de Bobadilla, who were closely related to the Monarchs Isabella and Ferdinand. They built a castle and a palace, where they were visited multiple times by the royal family, which attracted a court and boosted the development of the town.

In 1520, during the Revolt of the Comuneros, the Dominion was made a County, which brought Chinchón to a higher level of development through the investments made by nobility. Many of the larger constructions that we see today were built within the first hundred years after this date. The main church that now dominates the village was concluded as part of the Count's Palace complex. The castle was rebuilt from the ground, after severe damage during the revolt. The monastery of the Clarisas was endowed and built.

In 1629 the Counts were made Viceroys of Peru, which attracted a larger court to Chinchón. Many of the Italian and Flemish names that are still present in the population, such as Dusmet or del Nero go back to that period. During their viceroyalty, a remedy for malaria was found in Peru (where malaria was not endemic), quinine. This was an extract from the bark of a tree, which was named Chinchona in honour of the Countess, who allegedly had tried it on herself to recover from the illness.

In 1706 the county was directly involved in the War of the Spanish Succession. King Phillip V, the father of the Count, visited the city staying in the house now called Casa de la Cadena (House of the Chain) opposite the Parador - the chain is a traditional sign marking houses where a king has stayed. The population gathered on the main square and acclaimed the King, declaring full allegiance. Five months later the opposing side stormed and looted the town, finding strong resistance. In the end, Phillip V was the victor of that war, and thanked Chinchón by establishing its motto The very Noble and Very Loyal as well as facilitating investments for reconstruction.

=== Decadence and the Napoleonic wars ===
In 1808 the city was stormed and looted again, this time by the Napoleonic troops during the Spanish War of Independence.The parish church was destroyed, leaving the empty space next to its tower, which still stands today. The palace was mostly destroyed, with the exception of the church, which currently acts as parish church - the theatre now stands on part of the palace grounds. The castle was severely damaged, losing its first floor, as can be seen today. The Counts had already lost interest in Chinchón before the war, having moved to their other domains in Boadilla del Monte, and this destruction seemed to be fatal for the future of the city, with no investments made by its nobility over several decades.

=== Reconstruction by civil society ===
A new development occurred in 1845, when all the producers of wine, vinegar and alcohol in the municipality created a society called Sociedad de Cosecheros. This cooperative entity was successful as an enterprise, winning a Diploma of Honour and a gold medal in the Exposition Universelle of 1889 and 1900 respectively, and becoming Royal Purveyors to Queen Regent Maria Cristina.

The society engaged in a series of public works that brought back development and culture, this time on the basis of productive activities and run by civil society. They created infrastructure for water, building fountains for farmers, but also as picnic areas. They introduced public lighting, sewage, and contributed to the financing of the railway to Madrid, which was in operation until the 1960s. Beyond infrastructural works, major works of the society included the restoration of the main square, completing some of the buildings and giving it the formal function of an arena, as well as building the Theatre on the grounds of the former palace. This brought new prosperity to the town, which in 1916 was declared a city by King Alphonse XIII on the basis of its agricultural and cultural development.

In 1974 Chinchón was declared a Heritage Site with regulations for conservation focused on the use of original or traditional materials and building methods for every construction within its perimeter, as well as the protection of the main buildings. Currently the town is listed as one of Los Pueblos Más Bonitos de España (The most beautiful towns in Spain), being the only town in the Community of Madrid in that list.

== In film ==
In the 1950s Chinchón started to attract film-makers and, as of 2021, the Internet Movie Database lists 32 feature films mentioning Chinchón as their location.

=== Early days: Michael Anderson, Nicholas Ray, Henry Hathaway ===
A first major production was the 1953 French-Spanish film La belle de Cadix, where the Castilian town was portrayed as an Andalusian village.

Two years later, in Michael Anderson's Around the World in Eighty Days, the main square was the set for a comic bullfight scene on the Spanish leg of the journey, featuring Cantinflas as an unlikely matador, and most of the actual population of Chinchón as the audience.

In 1961 a crowd of 7,000 local extras were recruited in Chinchón - and the neighbouring villages - for the Sermon on the Mount scene in Samuel Bronston's production of King of Kings, directed by Nicholas Ray, shot on the rocky hills around the Castilian town.

In Henry Hathaway's Circus World (1963) the Wild West scenes were filmed in Chinchón, while the Europe scenes were shot in the nearby city of Aranjuez, as well as in Madrid and Barcelona.

=== Orson Welles ===
Orson Welles first arrived in Chinchón in 1965 to film several scenes of Chimes at Midnight. He rented a house and lived in the small town for long periods. The following year he started filming The Immortal Story in Chinchon, which he combined with Pedraza to portray old Macau, an Asian location with a strong resemblance to southern European cities, given its Portuguese origin.

=== Spanish cinema ===
Spanish film makers have also chosen this town for a long list of titles, including Carlos Saura's Deprisa deprisa, Pedro Almodovar's Matador or Alejandro Amenabar's While at War.

=== Wes Anderson ===
In May 2021 it was announced that Wes Anderson had started building a huge diorama set in Chinchón, and that a large crew would be spending several months in the Spanish town to produce his upcoming film, Asteroid City.

== See also ==
- Culture of the Community of Madrid#Chinchón
