= Abánades =

Abánades, Spain
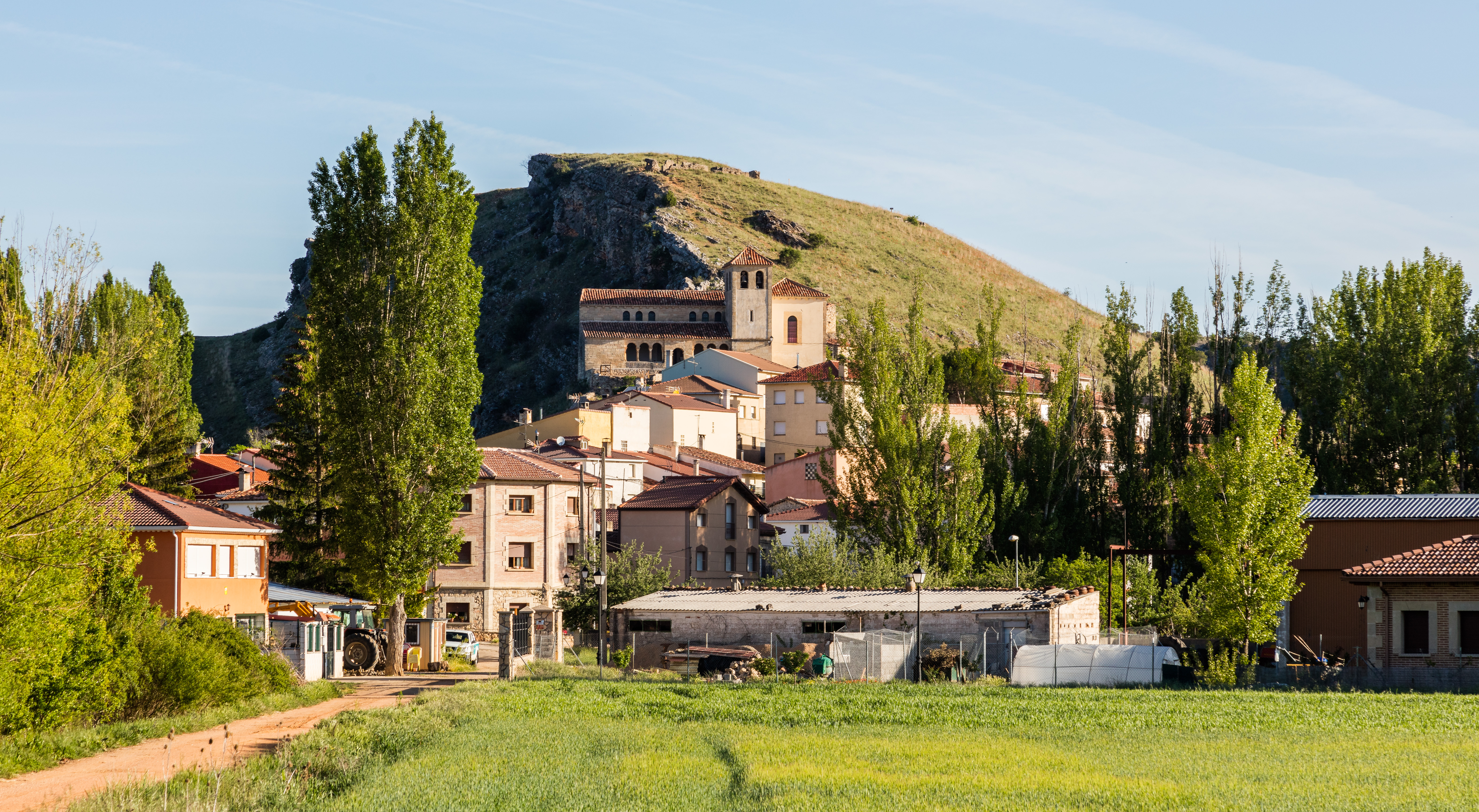

- Flag Coat of arms

- Location in Guadalajara Location in Castilla-La Mancha Location in Spain
- Coordinates: 40°53′33″N 2°29′7″W
- Country: Spain
- Autonomous community: Castile-La Mancha
- Province: Guadalajara
- Municipality: Abánades

Area
  - Total: 36.08 km^{2} (13.93 sq mi)
- Elevation: 1,039 m (3,409 ft)

Population (2025-01-01)
  - Total: 64
  - Density: 1.8/km^{2} (4.6/sq mi)
- Time zone: UTC+1 (CET)
  - Summer (DST): UTC+2 (CEST)
- Postal code: 19432

Abánades is a municipality located in the province of Guadalajara, Castile-La Mancha, Spain. According to the 2017 census (INE), the municipality had a population of 59 inhabitants and a population density of 1.5 people per square kilometer.

== Demographics ==
Demographic evolution
1991	1996	2001	2004	2006	2009	2017
128	125	114	107	97	83	59

== History of Abánades ==
In the tenth and eleventh centuries, Medinaceli (today a town in the province of Soria) became the military capital of the Central March due to its strategic importance as a defensive stronghold against the advance of the Christian kingdoms. The reconquest of Medinaceli that occurred in the year 1104, led by Alfonso VI, included the areas of Soria and Guadalajara in the north, and a portion of Teruel in addition to Abánades itself. The first documents from the municipality of Abánades from the fourteenth century classify Albánades as part of the jurisdiction of Medinaceli, which suggests that, in the past, the territory that the municipality now occupies used to belong to the city of Medinaceli when it was under Arab rule. The area was not repopulated until fifty years later.

There is no documentation of Abánades until the first year of the 12th century, when Peter I (the Cruel), King of Castile and León, commissioned the Becerro de las Behetrías de Castilla (a record of Castile's nobility [las Behetrías de Castilla] bound in calf skin [becerro]), to make a record of all the people who were within the domain of the Castile crown.

In more recent history, Abánades is notable for its role in the Spanish Civil War. In March 1938, after two years of fighting, the nationalist faction, intending to reach the Mediterranean and split the Republic's forces in two, initiated an attack in Aragon. To help the Eastern Army, Cipriano Mera went on the offensive in Guadalajara. In Abánades, Battalion 268 from San Fernando arrived from Renales, situating itself in Castile, which was not yet under Republican occupation, taking the furthest forward position of the Nationalists in the sector. After several intense days of combat, the front stabilized. The skirmish became known as the “Forgotten Battle,” one of the least-known battles in the history of the Civil War, due to taking over 7,000 casualties between both sides.

== Geography ==
=== Location ===
The municipality is situated 1,039 meters (3,409 feet) above sea level. Its highest point is the mountain Majada Ancha, which reaches an altitude of 1154 meters (3,786 feet). Abánades is dotted with hills. Among the most notable are La Tablada, El Chaparral, Los Llanos, El Tejar, and El Castillo.

=== Geology ===
Abánades is located near geologically ancient ground, whose clay soil formed the town. When the clay compacts, it forms slate, which is the most abundant rock in the area. Due to being abundant in clay, there is also a large quantity of quartzite.

=== Climate ===
Abánades has a Mediterranean climate. The winters in Abánades are typically cold and the summers very hot.

=== Hydrology ===
The Tajuña river, a tributary of the Tagus river, is critical for Abánades because the town uses it to water the farmland in the area. There is also the Valdelasarna brook, located north of the town, which irrigates some arable land. The brook forms a narrow valley that runs towards the Tajuña in the east.

== Monuments ==
Among the town's notable monuments are the Parish Church of St. Peter, dating from the 16th century, and the Chapel of Our Lady of Mercy.

== Festivals ==
The municipality of Abánades observes local festivals in honor of its patron saint in the first week of August and on the September 24. These festivals honor the patroness of Abánades, Nuestra Señora de la Merced—the Virgin of Mercy. The festivals, which are of great importance in the area, feature games, shows, musical performances, dances, and other entertainment to honor the patroness. There are also festivities in town on May 15 to honor Saint Isidore.

== See also ==
- Tajuña
- List of municipalities in Guadalajara
