= Tajuña =

River in central Spain

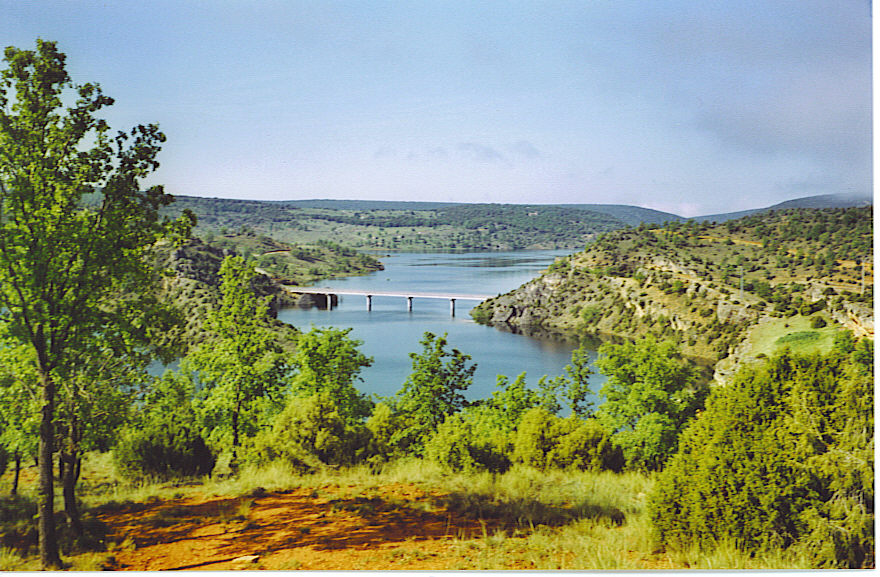
- Tajera reservoir
- Etymology: Tagonius, its Latin name

Location
- Country: c
- State: Guadalajara, Madrid
- Region: Castile-La Mancha, Madrid

Physical characteristics
- Source: Fuente del Carro
  - location: Clares, Guadalajara
  - coordinates: 41°1′48″N 2°8′24″W
  - elevation: 1,244 m (4,081 ft)
- Mouth
  - location: Titulcia, Madrid
  - coordinates: 40°7′43″N 3°34′57″W
  - elevation: 509 m (1,670 ft)
- Length: 225 km (140 mi)
- Basin size: 2,608 km^{2} (1,007 sq mi)
- Discharge
  - average: 1.87 m^{3}/s (66 cu ft/s)

Basin features
- Progression: Jarama→ Tagus→ Atlantic Ocean
- River system: Jarama
- Tributaries
  - left: Ungría
  - right: Matayeguas

The Tajuña (Spanish: [taˈxuɲa]; from the Latin Tagonius) is a river in central Spain, flowing through the provinces of Guadalajara and Madrid. It is a tributary of the river Jarama which in turn is a tributary of the Tagus. It rises in the Sierra de Solorio, near the town of Maranchón (Guadalajara), at a location known as Fuente del Carro near the village of Clares.

== Course ==
Near its source it flows through a landscape of high altitude moorlands, through deep valleys of Miocene era limestone, characterised by clays, marls and dolomitic limestone. It has one reservoir, La Tajera, with an extension of 409 ha near Cifuentes. It crosses the villages of Luzón, Anguita, Luzaga, Cortes de Tajuña, Brihuega and Renera in Guadalajara province and enters Madrid province at Ambite; it then passes close to Orusco, Carabaña, Tielmes, Perales de Tajuña and Morata de Tajuña, before joining the Jarama near Titulcia.

== Climate ==
The climate in the river basin is Mediterranean, getting more arid closer to the Jarama. Rainfall is more frequent in autumn and winter.

== Morphology ==
Being an internal river, its tributaries in the province of Guadalajara are seasonal streams which only contain water in spring. The Tajuña gets its water from springs and from the Calizas del Páramo de la Alcarria aquifer which covers 1,800 km² at a depth of 30–40 m.
