= Aguilar de Montuenga =

Coordinates: 41°13′N 2°14′W

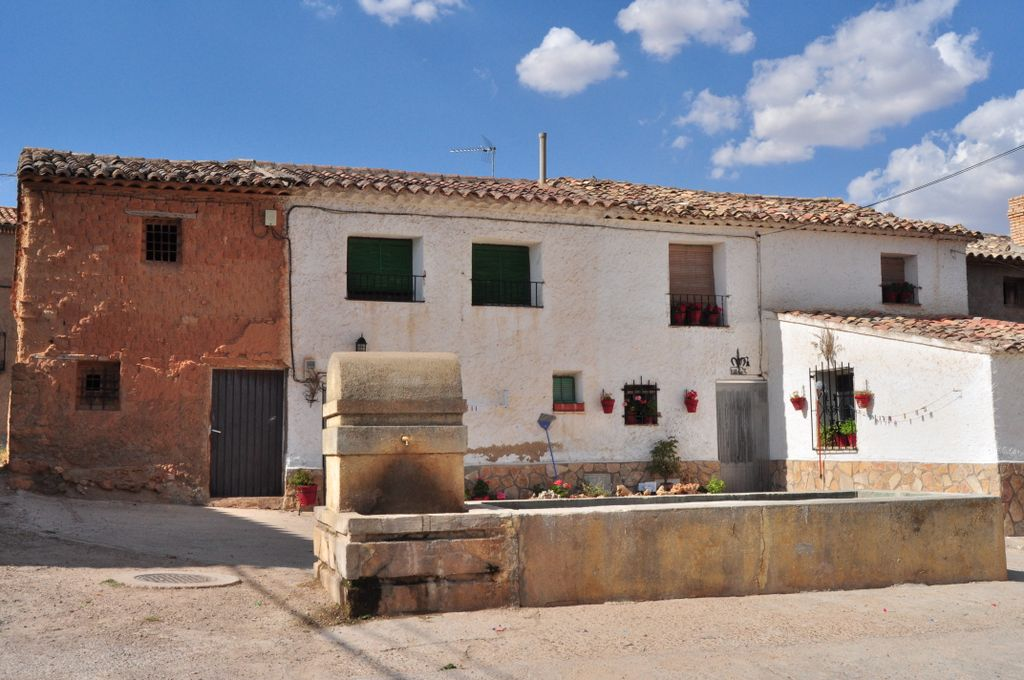
- Interactive map of Aguilar de Montuenga
- Country: Spain
- Province: Soria
- Municipality: Arcos de Jalón
- Elevation: 842 m (2,762 ft)

Population (2017)
  - Total: 22
- Demonyms: aguilareño, ña
- Time zone: UTC+1 (CET)
  - Summer (DST): UTC+2 (CEST)

Aguilar de Montuenga is a village under the local government of the municipality of Arcos de Jalón, Soria, Spain.
