= Montuenga de Soria =

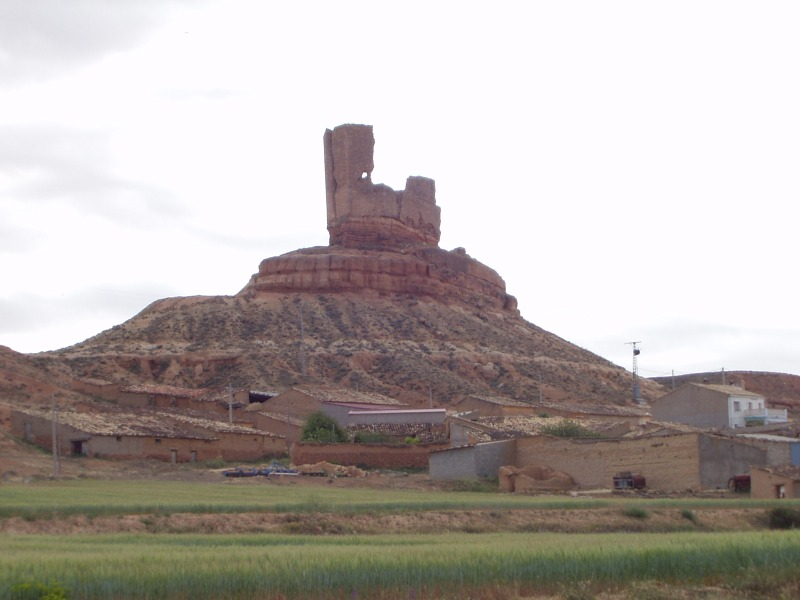
- Montuenga Castle in 2006

- Location in Spain
- Coordinates: 41°13′27″N 2°12′50″W
- Country: Spain
- Province: Soria
- Municipality: Arcos de Jalón
- Elevation: 820 m (2,690 ft)

Population (2017)
  - Total: 94
- Time zone: UTC+1 (CET)
  - Summer (DST): UTC+2 (CEST)
- Website: arcosdejalon.es

Montuenga de Soria is a village under the local government of the municipality of Arcos de Jalón, Soria, Spain, 105 kilometers from Madrid. The village had a population of 141 inhabitants in 2001.

The village is overlooked by the remains of Montuenga Castle.
