= Turmiel =

- Village
- Location within Province of Guadalajara Location within Spain
- Coordinates: 41°0′36″N 2°3′43″W
- Country: Spain
- Autonomous community: Castilla–La Mancha
- Province: Province of Guadalajara
- Municipality: Maranchón
- Elevation: 1,117 m (3,665 ft)

Population
  - Total: 7

Turmiel is a hamlet located in the municipality of Maranchón, in Guadalajara province, Castilla–La Mancha, Spain. As of 2020, it has a population of 7.

== Geography ==
Turmiel is located 122 km east-northeast of Guadalajara, Spain.
