= Codes, Maranchón =

Codes
- Village
- Location within Province of Guadalajara Location within Spain
- Coordinates: 41°4′40″N 2°7′18″W
- Country: Spain
- Autonomous community: Castilla–La Mancha
- Province: Province of Guadalajara
- Municipality: Maranchón
- Elevation: 1,338 m (4,390 ft)

Population
  - Total: 5

Codes is a hamlet located in the municipality of Maranchón, in Guadalajara province, Castilla–La Mancha, Spain. As of 2020, it has a population of 5.

== Geography ==
Codes is located 112 km east-northeast of Guadalajara, Spain.
