= Urex de Medinaceli =

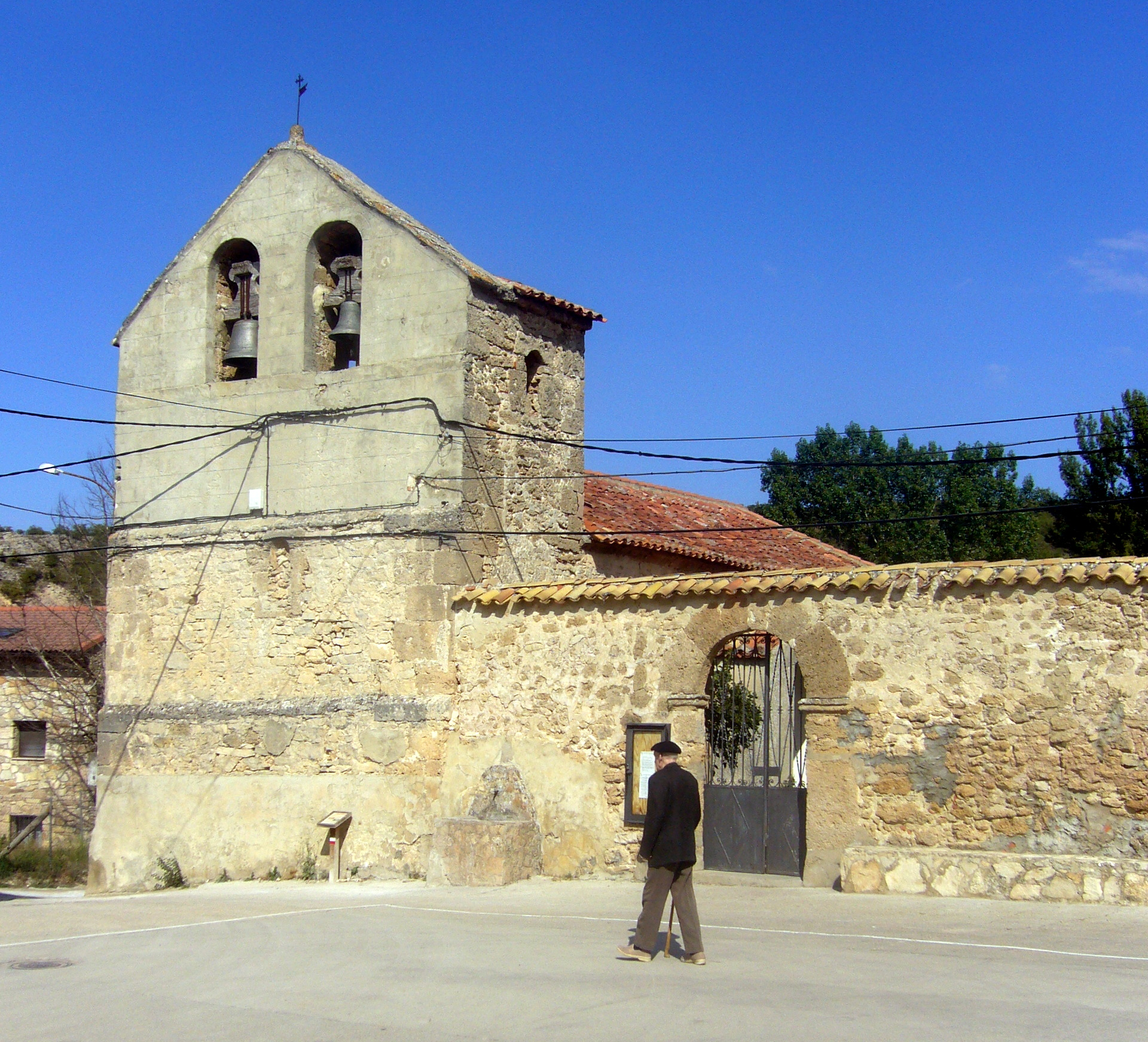
- A church in Urex de Medinaceli
- Interactive map of Urex de Medinaceli
- Coordinates: 41°07′36″N 2°19′56″W
- Country: Spain
- Province: Soria
- Municipality: Arcos de Jalón
- Elevation: 1,126 m (3,694 ft)

Population (2010)
  - Total: 7
- Time zone: UTC+1 (CET)
  - Summer (DST): UTC+2 (CEST)

Urex de Medinaceli is a village under the local government of the municipality of Arcos de Jalón, in Soria, Spain.
