= Montuenga Castle =

Coordinates: 41°13′31″N 2°12′39″W

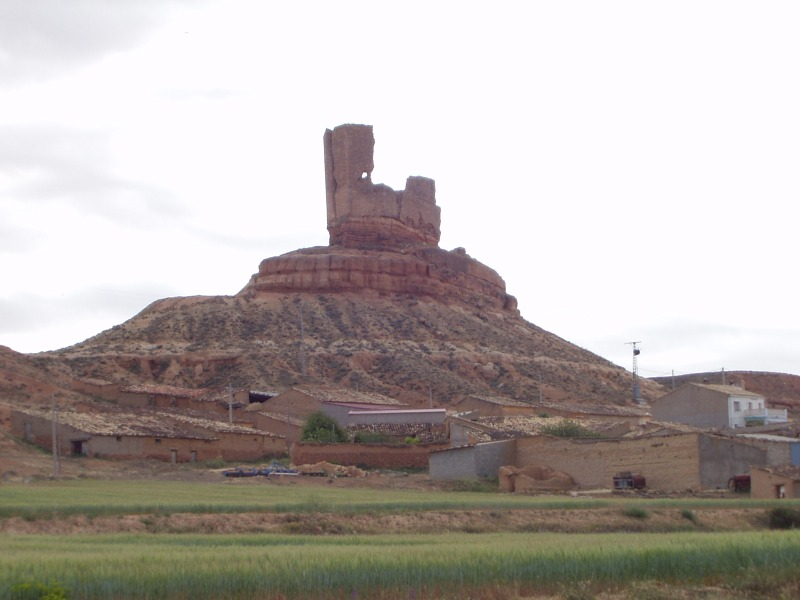
Montuenga Castle overlooking Montuenga de Soria

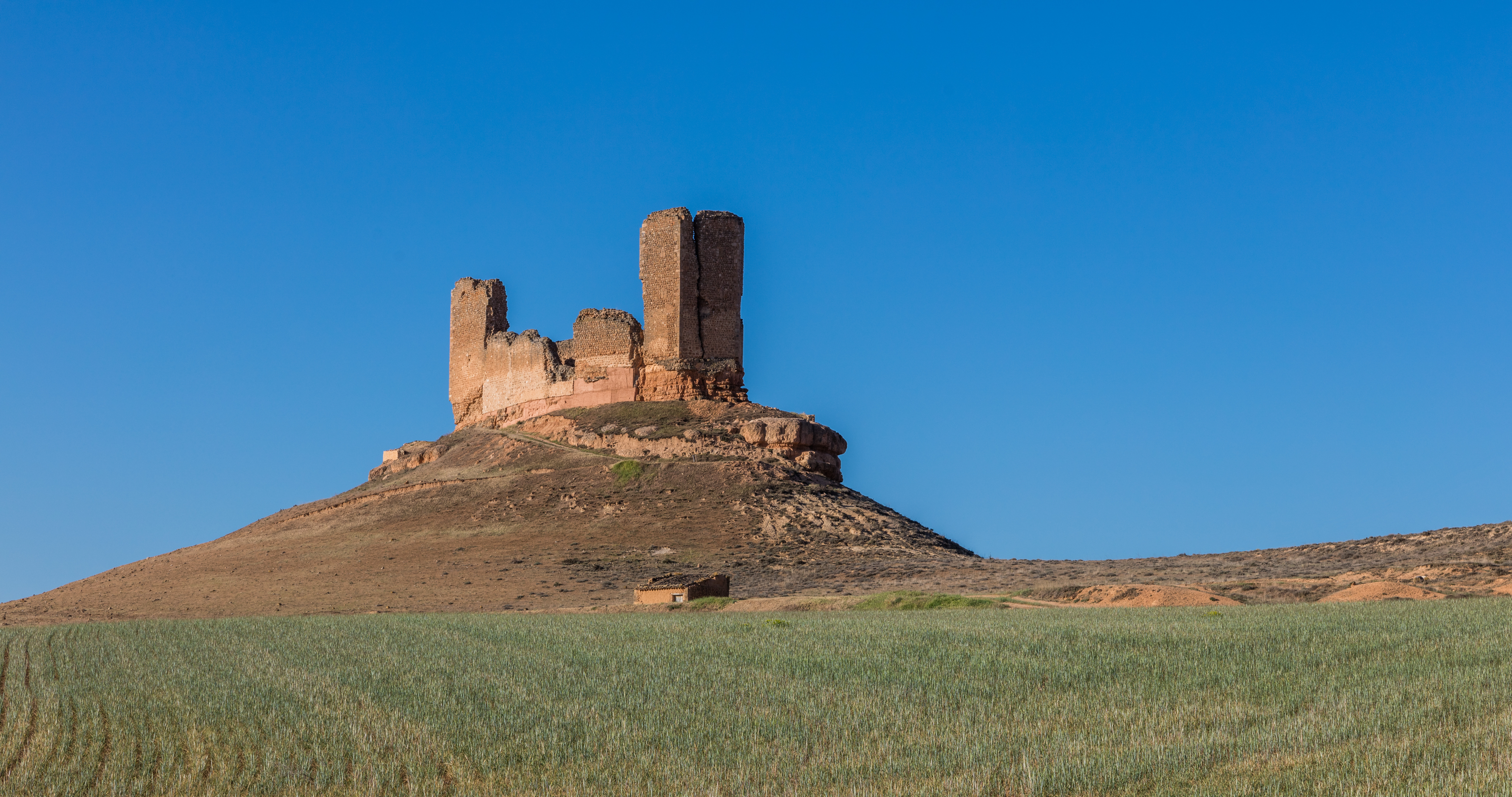
Montuenga Castle seen from the A2 motorway and railway line

Montuenga Castle in the province of Soria, Spain forms part of the defensive line of the Jalón River set in a natural passage between the central plateau of Spain and the strategic basin of the Ebro.

The castle is perched on a high hill, steep and long, from which it dominates the village of Montuenga de Soria. The remains of the building, two polygonal towers at each end, are joined by walls.

Montuenga de Soria is located in the province of Soria, 105 kilometers from Madrid. The village is part of the municipality of Arcos de Jalon with the town about 5km away. The castle overlooks and so controlled access between Castile and Aragon. The area was subject to disputes, notable during the Castilian Civil War.
