= Anguita =

- Municipality
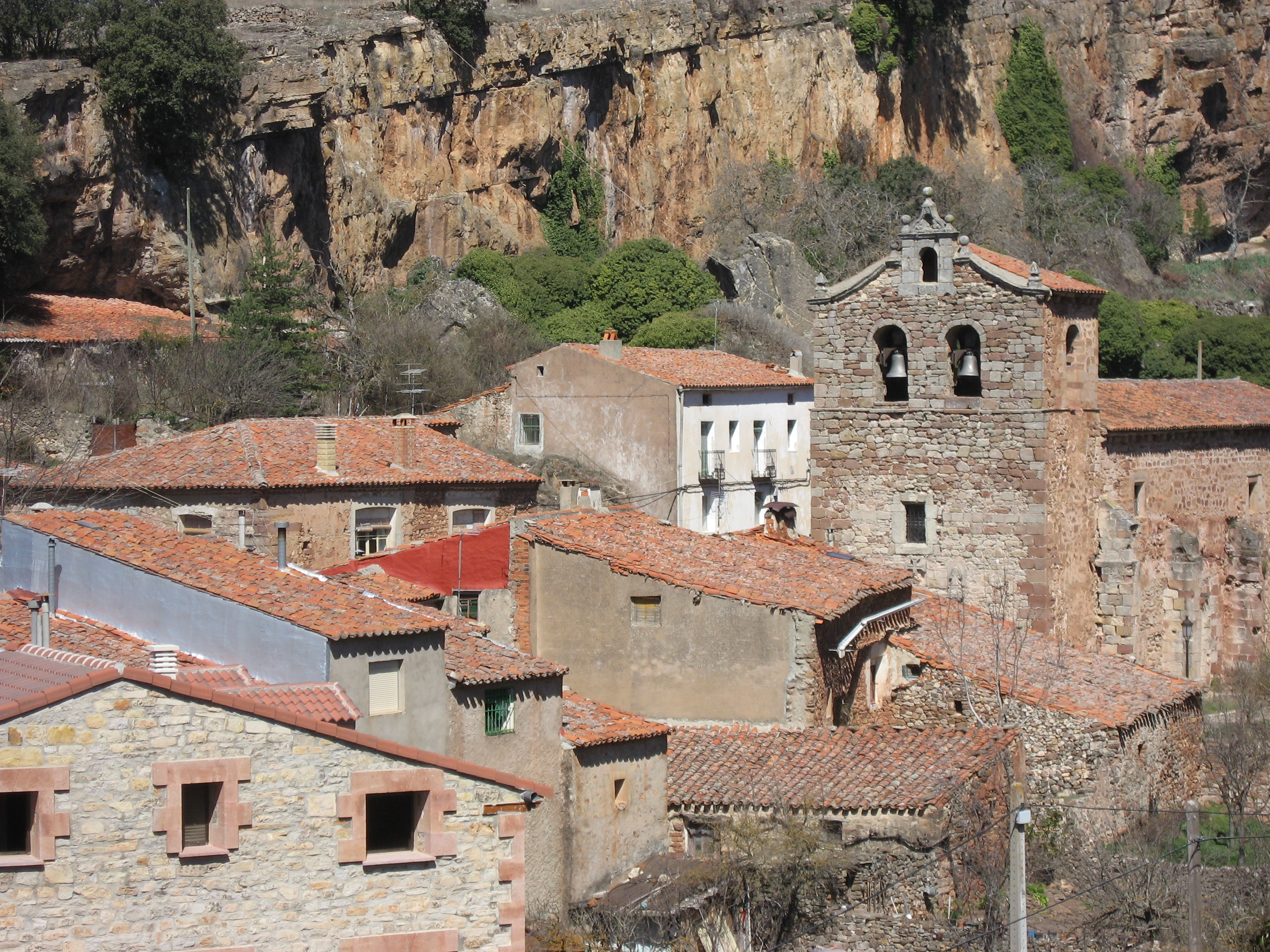

- Coat of arms

- Location in Spain Anguita (Castilla-La Mancha) Anguita (Spain)
- Coordinates: 41°01′33″N 2°22′07″W
- Country: Spain
- Autonomous community: Castile-La Mancha
- Province: Guadalajara
- Comarca: Sierra norte de Guadalajara
- Judicial district: Sigüenza

Government
  - Mayor: Claudio Sancho González (PSOE)

Area
  - Total: 127.19 km^{2} (49.11 sq mi)
- Elevation: 1,107 m (3,632 ft)

Population (2025-01-01)
  - Total: 150
  - Density: 1.2/km^{2} (3.1/sq mi)
- Demonym: Anguiteños
- Time zone: UTC+1 (CET)
  - Summer (DST): UTC+2 (CEST)
- Postal code: 19283

Anguita is a municipality in the province of Guadalajara, Castile-La Mancha, Spain, with a population of 203 in 2009.

== Geography ==
Anguita is located in the Sistema Ibérico below Sierra Ministra. River Tajuña and its tributaries, La Madre and Prado Creek flow through the area.

The municipality includes the towns of Aguilar de Anguita, Anguita, Padilla del Ducado, Santa María del Espino and Villarejo de Medina.

There is an important population of Dupont's lark (Chersophilus duponti) in the surrounding area.

== History ==
Anguita's area has been populated since ancient times. Anguita has remains of a Roman camp, although it is possible that it has been a Celtiberian city before.

During the al-Andalus period, Anguita was located on the frontier with the northern Christian-held territory.

In 1813 the first Diputation of Spain was signed here.

== Main sights ==
- Cigüeña Tower.
- Remains of the Roman camp
- Castro del Hocincavero and some others ruins, such as those of Aguilar de Anguita, where is the biggest necropolis of this culture, "El Altillo".
- Saint Peter Church, a Romanesque-Gothic church.
- Virgen de la Lastra hermitage, the biggest church in the village.
- La Soledad hermitage, a typical local hermitage.
