= Arcos de Jalón =

Coordinates: 41°13′N 2°16′W

- Municipality
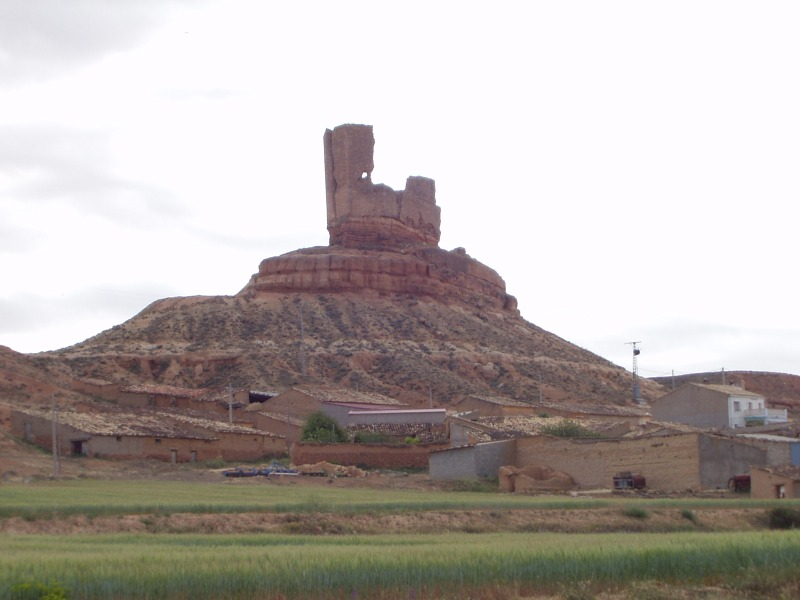
- Ruins of Montuenga Castle near Arcos de Jalón.

- Flag Coat of arms

- Country: Spain
- Autonomous community: Castile and León
- Province: Soria
- Comarca: Arcos de Jalón

Government
  - Mayor: Jesús Ángel Peregrina Molina

Area
  - Total: 441.54 km^{2} (170.48 sq mi)
- Elevation: 831 m (2,726 ft)

Population (2025-01-01)
  - Total: 1,531
  - Density: 3.467/km^{2} (8.981/sq mi)
- Demonym: Arcobrigenses
- Time zone: UTC+1 (CET)
  - Summer (DST): UTC+2 (CEST)
- Website: Official website

Arcos de Jalón is a municipality located in the province of Soria, Castile and León, Spain. As of 2009, it had a population of 1,782.

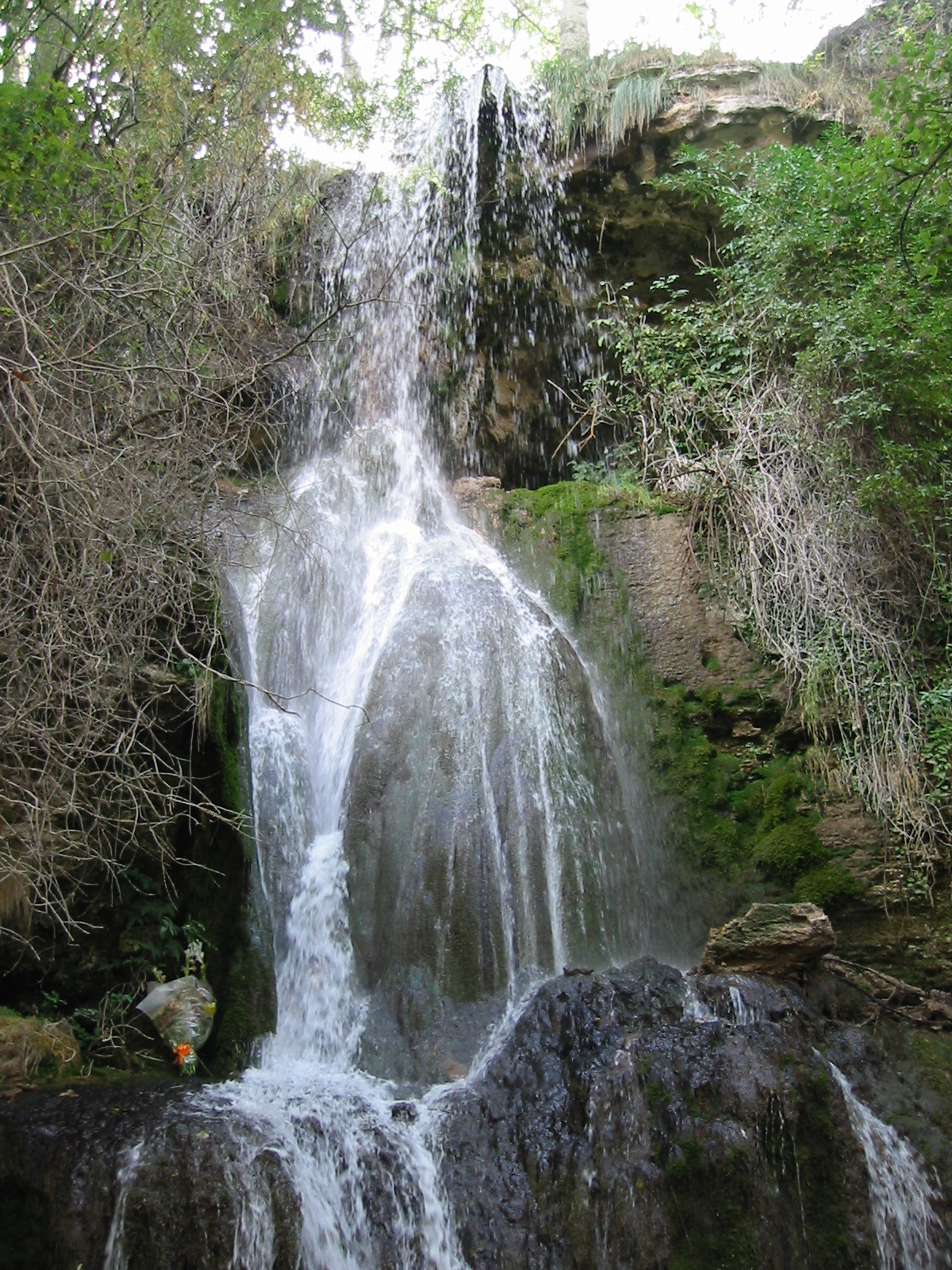
La Chorronera, in the municipality of Arcos de Jalón.

== List of settlements included in the municipality ==
- Aguilar de Montuenga
- Chaorna
- Jubera
- Judes
- Iruecha
- Layna
- Montuenga de Soria
- Sagides
- Somaén
- Urex de Medinaceli
- Utrilla
- Velilla de Medinaceli
