= Balbacil =

- Village
- Location within Province of Guadalajara Location within Spain
- Coordinates: 41°2′39″N 2°6′31″W
- Country: Spain
- Autonomous community: Castilla–La Mancha
- Province: Province of Guadalajara
- Municipality: Maranchón
- Elevation: 1,284 m (4,213 ft)

Population
  - Total: 4

Balbacil is a hamlet located in the municipality of Maranchón, in Guadalajara province, Castilla–La Mancha, Spain. As of 2020, it has a population of 4.

== Geography ==
Balbacil is located 112 km east-northeast of Guadalajara, Spain.
