= Titulcia =

- Municipality
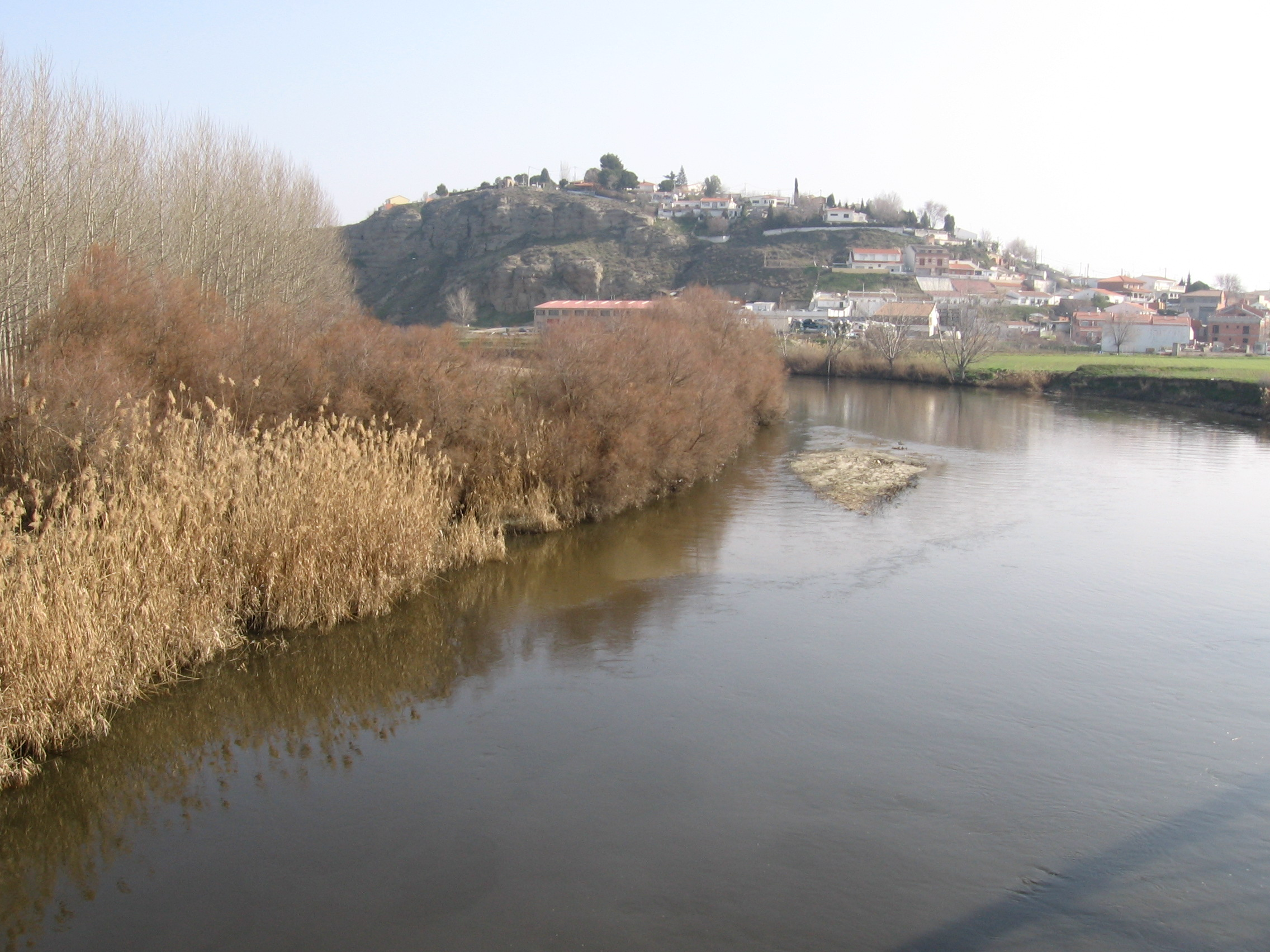
- The Jarama river at Titulcia

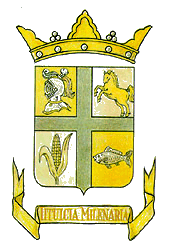
- Coat of arms

- Municipal location within the Community of Madrid.

- Location in Spain
- Coordinates: 40°8′12″N 3°34′12″W
- Country: Spain
- Autonomous community: Community of Madrid
- Province: Madrid
- Comarca: Las Vegas

Government
  - Mayor: Fuencisla Molinero Cuenca

Area
  - Total: 9.9 km^{2} (3.8 sq mi)
- Elevation: 509 m (1,670 ft)

Population (2025-01-01)
  - Total: 1,389
  - Density: 140/km^{2} (360/sq mi)
- Time zone: UTC+1 (CET)
  - Summer (DST): UTC+2 (CEST)
- Postal code: 28539
- Climate: BSk

Titulcia is a municipality of the Community of Madrid, Spain.

== History ==
Supposedly of Roman origin, Titulcia is situated on the ancient military road from Emerita Augusta and Cesaraugusta (now Zaragoza). With the arrival of the Arabs, the city was razed, but it regained its previous significance during the Reconquest and thereafter taking the name of Bayonne (c. 1208)

Its strategic position was recognized by the French occupiers during the Napoleonic Wars, who held it until 1814. After the defeat of the French, the town recovered its original name at the insistence of King Fernando VII.

The city was destroyed, for the fifth time in its history, during the Spanish Civil War, when it was the divisional headquarters of Republican forces.

== Fiestas ==
- Fiesta del día del Hornazo, a sort of hot cross bun to celebrate Christ's Resurrection on Easter Sunday
- Fiesta de la Virgen del Rosario (Our Lady of the Rosary), last week in August
