= Maranchón =

Maranchón, Spain
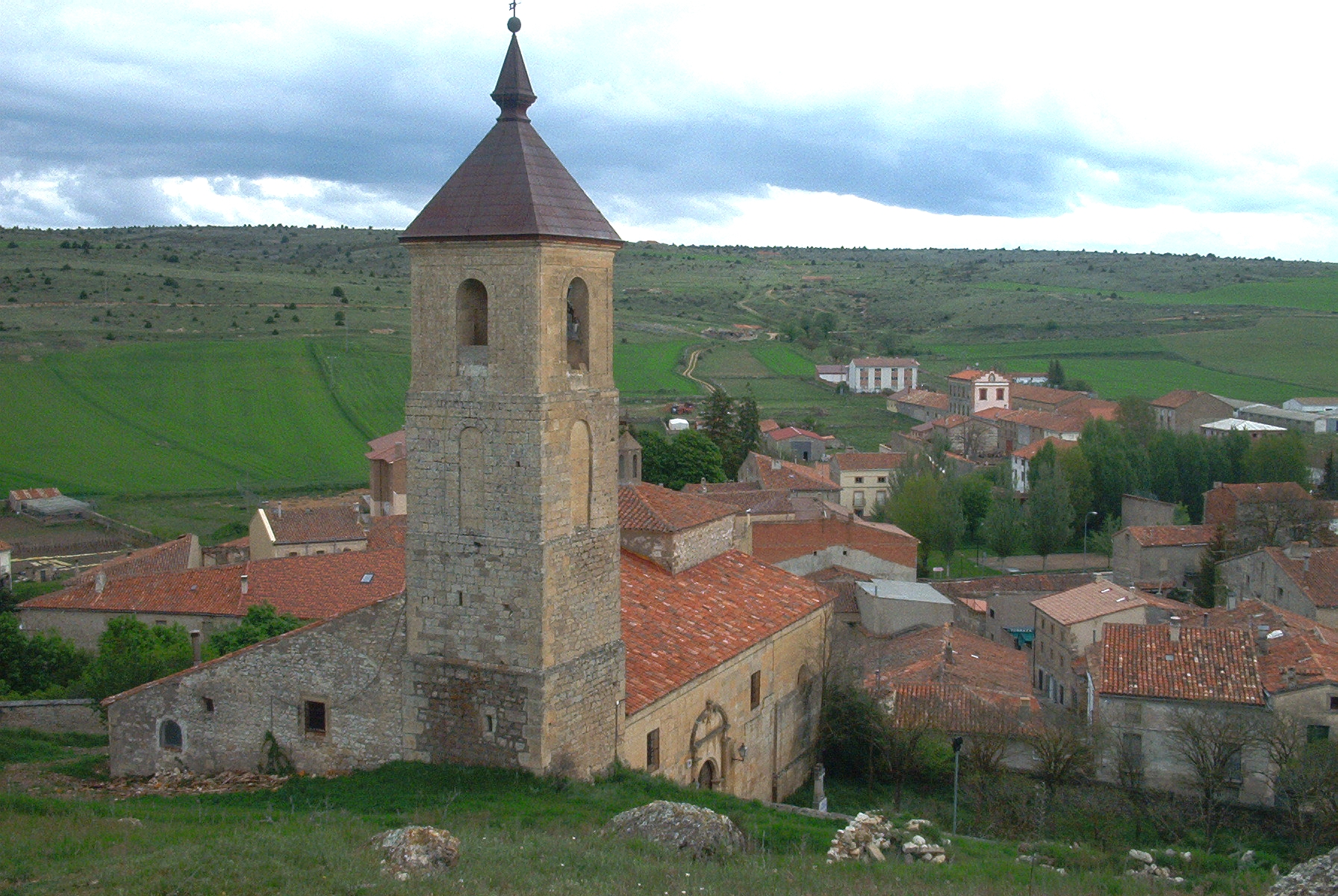

- Coat of arms

- Location within Province of Guadalajara Location within Castilla-La Mancha Location within Spain
- Coordinates: 41°02′55″N 2°12′13″W
- Country: Spain
- Autonomous community: Castile-La Mancha
- Province: Guadalajara
- Municipality: Maranchón

Area
  - Total: 153.32 km^{2} (59.20 sq mi)
- Elevation: 1,256 m (4,121 ft)

Population (2025-01-01)
  - Total: 225
  - Density: 1.47/km^{2} (3.80/sq mi)
- Time zone: UTC+1 (CET)
  - Summer (DST): UTC+2 (CEST)

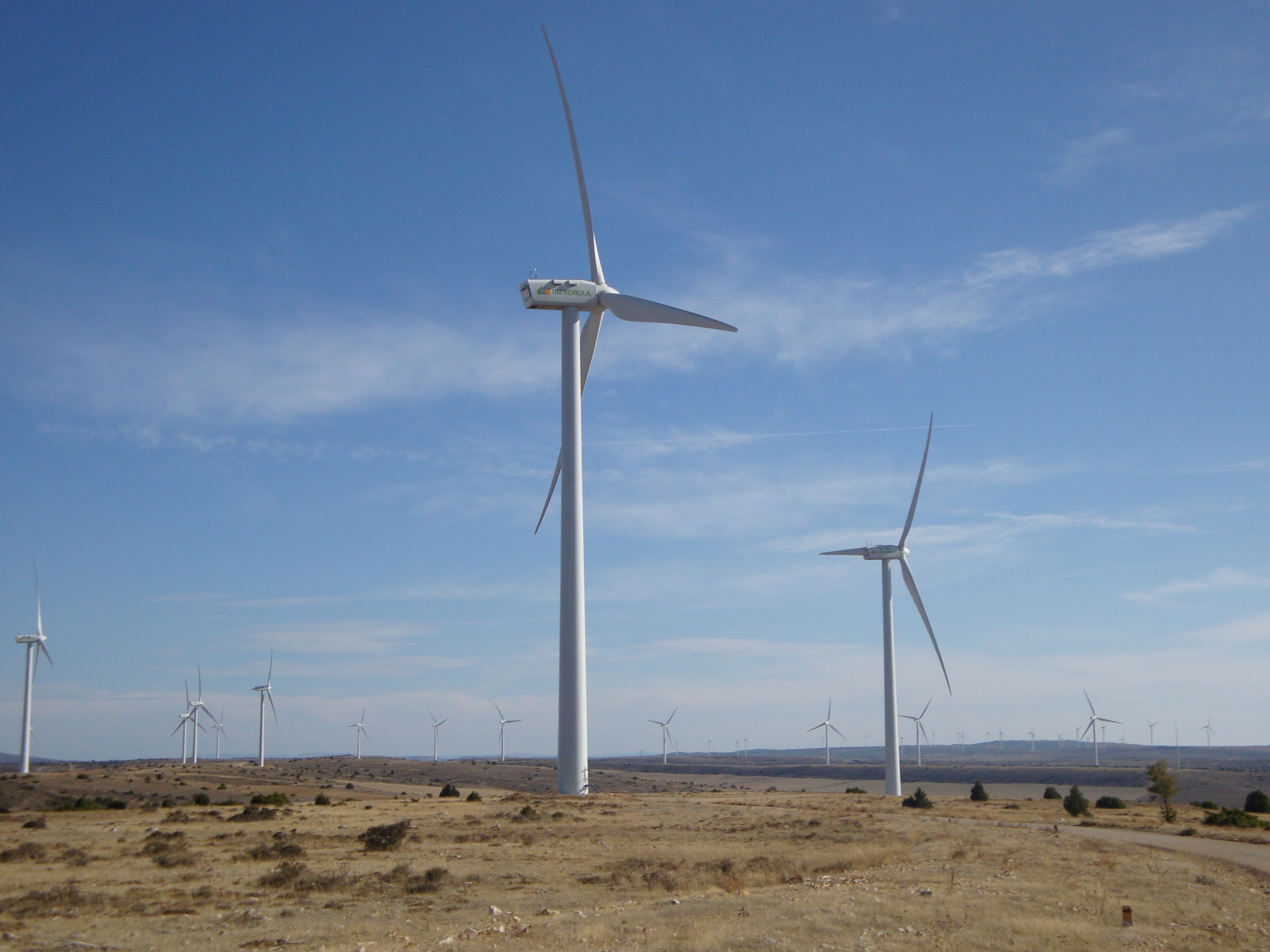
Maranchón Complex wind farm

Maranchón is a municipality located in the province of Guadalajara, Castile-La Mancha, Spain. According to the 2004 census (INE), the municipality had a population of 244 inhabitants.

One of the biggest wind farms in Europe is located in the Maranchón municipal term, on top of the ridges of the Sierra de Solorio range. La Migaña is a local slang used mainly among cattle-herders.

== Villages ==
- Maranchón
- Clares
- Balbacil
- Turmiel
- Codes
