= Fuembellida =

Fuembellida, Spain
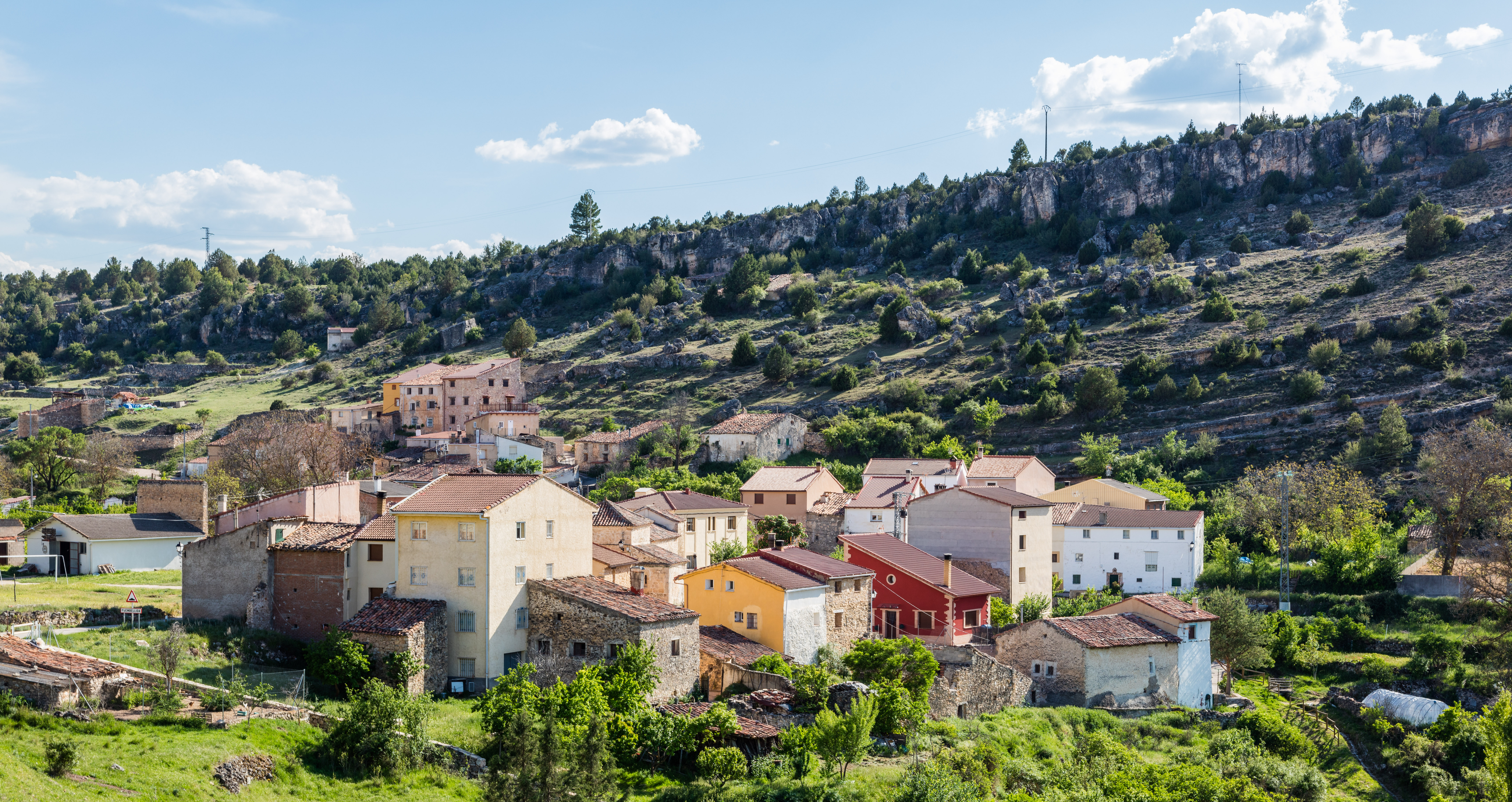

- Location within Province of Guadalajara Location within Castilla-La Mancha Location within Spain
- Coordinates: 40°45′25″N 1°59′51″W
- Country: Spain
- Autonomous community: Castile-La Mancha
- Province: Guadalajara
- Municipality: Fuembellida

Area
  - Total: 26.05 km^{2} (10.06 sq mi)

Population (2025-01-01)
  - Total: 13
  - Density: 0.50/km^{2} (1.3/sq mi)
- Time zone: UTC+1 (CET)
  - Summer (DST): UTC+2 (CEST)

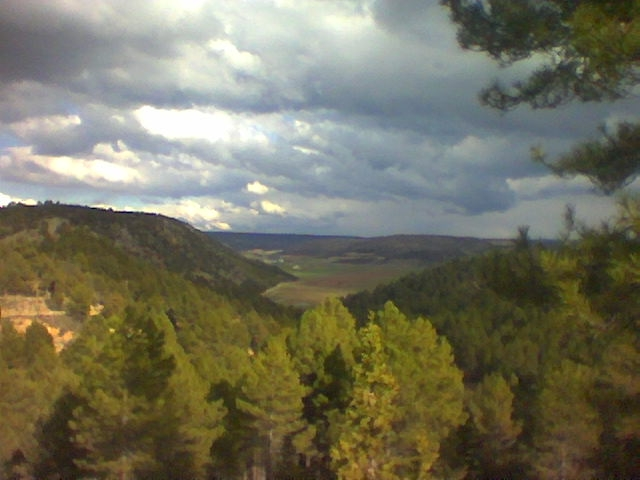
View of Vega de Arias, located between the municipal terms of Fuembellida and Tierzo

Fuembellida is a municipality located in the province of Guadalajara, Castile-La Mancha, Spain. According to the 2004 census (INE), the municipality had a population of 15 inhabitants.
