= Tierzo =

Tierzo, Spain
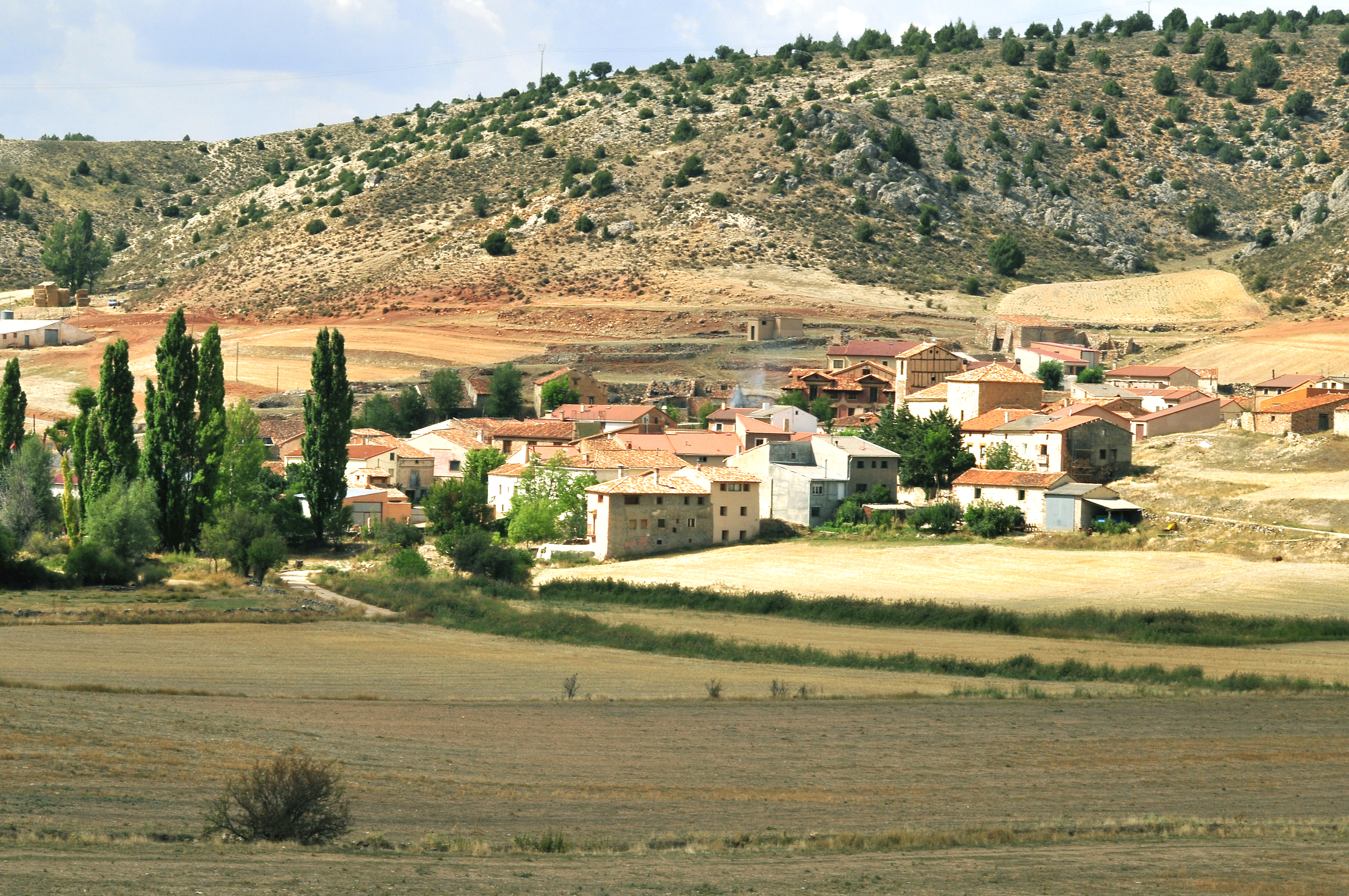

- Location within Province of Guadalajara Location within Castilla-La Mancha Location within Spain
- Country: Spain
- Autonomous community: Castile-La Mancha
- Province: Guadalajara
- Municipality: Tierzo

Area
  - Total: 39 km^{2} (15 sq mi)

Population (2025-01-01)
  - Total: 32
  - Density: 0.82/km^{2} (2.1/sq mi)
- Time zone: UTC+1 (CET)
  - Summer (DST): UTC+2 (CEST)

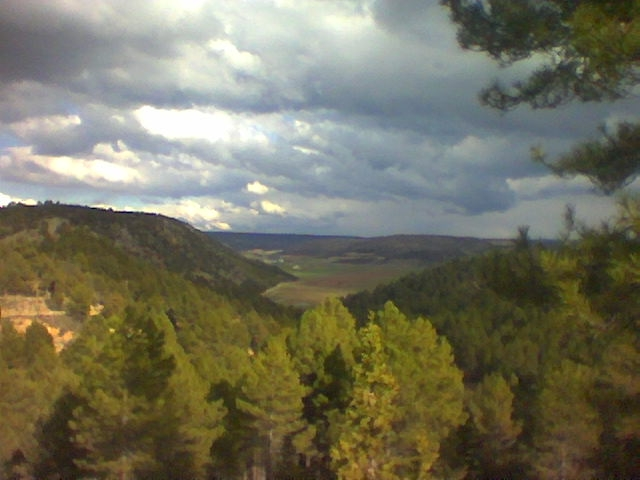
View of Vega de Arias, located between the municipal terms of Fuembellida and Tierzo

Tierzo is a municipality located in the province of Guadalajara, Castile-La Mancha, Spain. According to the 2004 census (INE), the municipality has a population of 52 inhabitants.
