= Setiles =

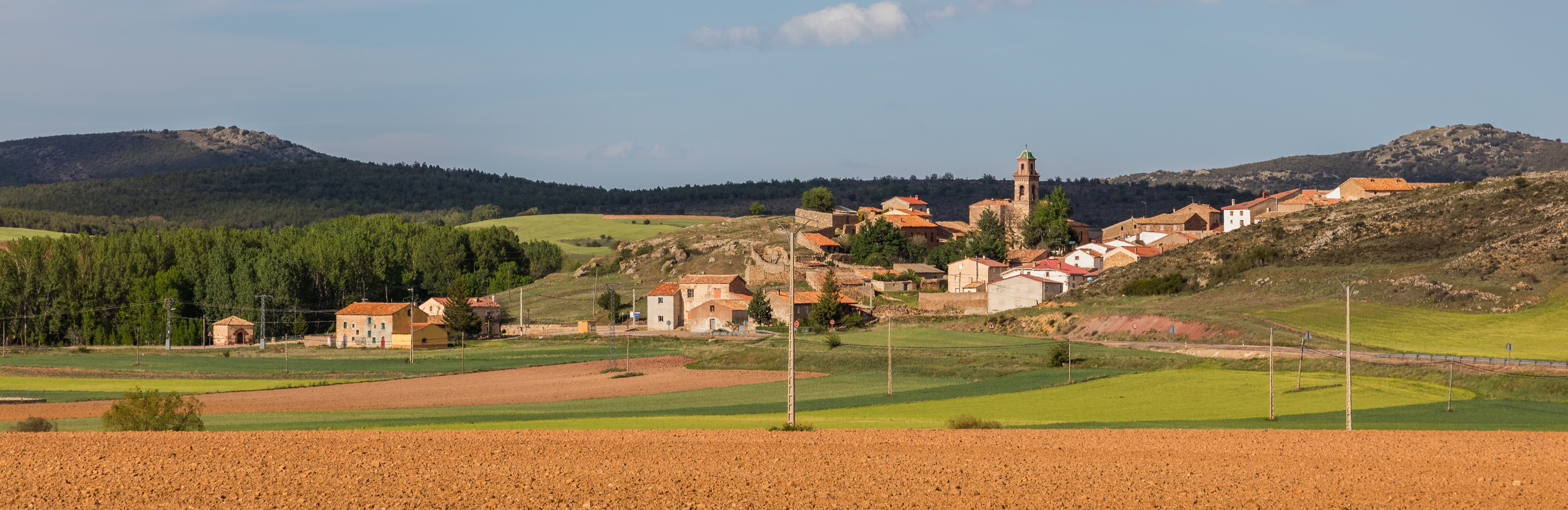

- Location within Province of Guadalajara Location within Castilla-La Mancha Location within Spain
- Coordinates: 40°44′N 1°37′W
- Country: Spain
- Autonomous community: Castile-La Mancha
- Province: Guadalajara
- Municipality: Setiles

Area
  - Total: 56.77 km^{2} (21.92 sq mi)
- Elevation: 1,256 m (4,121 ft)

Population (2025-01-01)
  - Total: 78
  - Density: 1.4/km^{2} (3.6/sq mi)
- Time zone: UTC+1 (CET)
  - Summer (DST): UTC+2 (CEST)
- Website: http://www.setiles.com/

Setiles is a municipality located in the province of Guadalajara, Castile-La Mancha, Spain. According to the 2015 census (INE), the municipality had a population of 84 inhabitants.

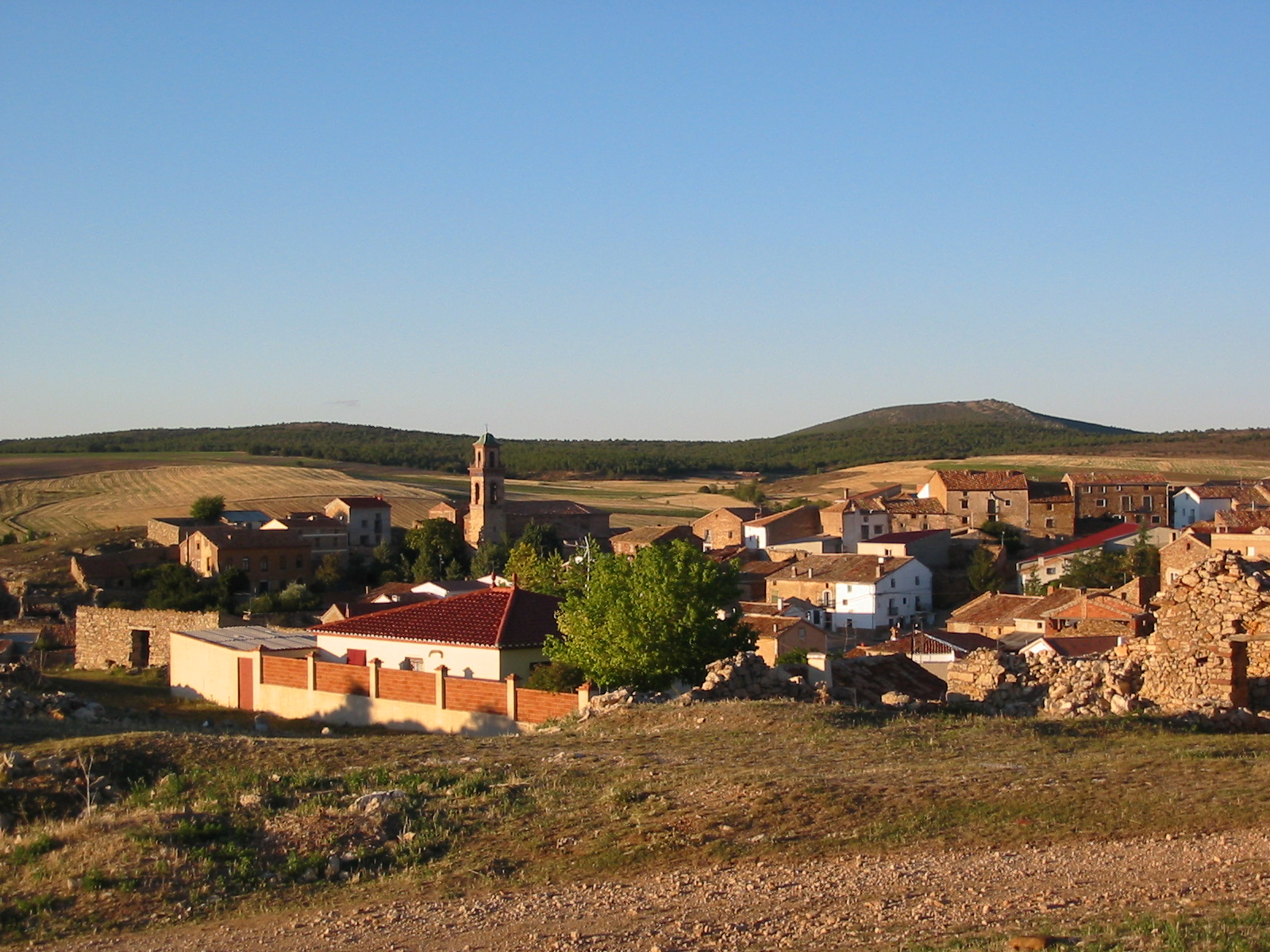
Vista parcial del núcleo de la población.
