= Yélamos =

Yélamos may refer to:

- Yélamos de Abajo, municipality located in the province of Guadalajara, Castile-La Mancha, Spain
- Yélamos de Arriba, municipality located in the province of Guadalajara, Castile-La Mancha, Spain
