= Yélamos de Abajo =

Yélamos de Abajo, Spain
- Location within Province of Guadalajara Location within Castilla-La Mancha Location within Spain
- Coordinates: 40°37′55″N 2°51′16″W
- Country: Spain
- Autonomous community: Castile-La Mancha
- Province: Guadalajara
- Municipality: Yélamos de Abajo

Area
  - Total: 12.37 km^{2} (4.78 sq mi)

Population (2025-01-01)
  - Total: 57
  - Density: 4.6/km^{2} (12/sq mi)
- Time zone: UTC+1 (CET)
  - Summer (DST): UTC+2 (CEST)

Yélamos de Abajo is a municipality located in the province of Guadalajara, Castile-La Mancha, Spain. According to the 2004 census (INE), the municipality had a population of 84 inhabitants.
