= Fuentelahiguera de Albatages =

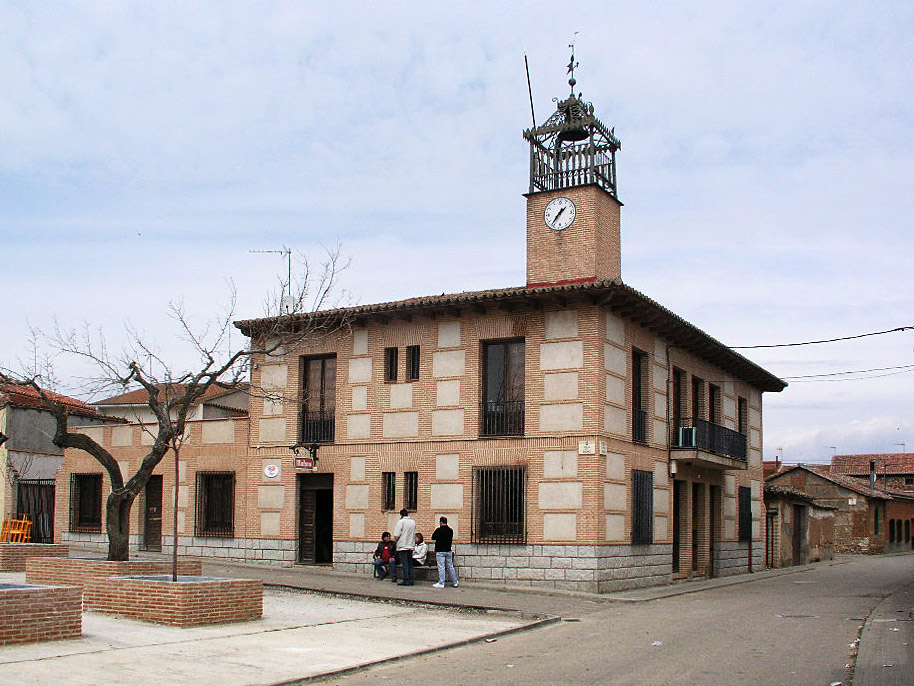

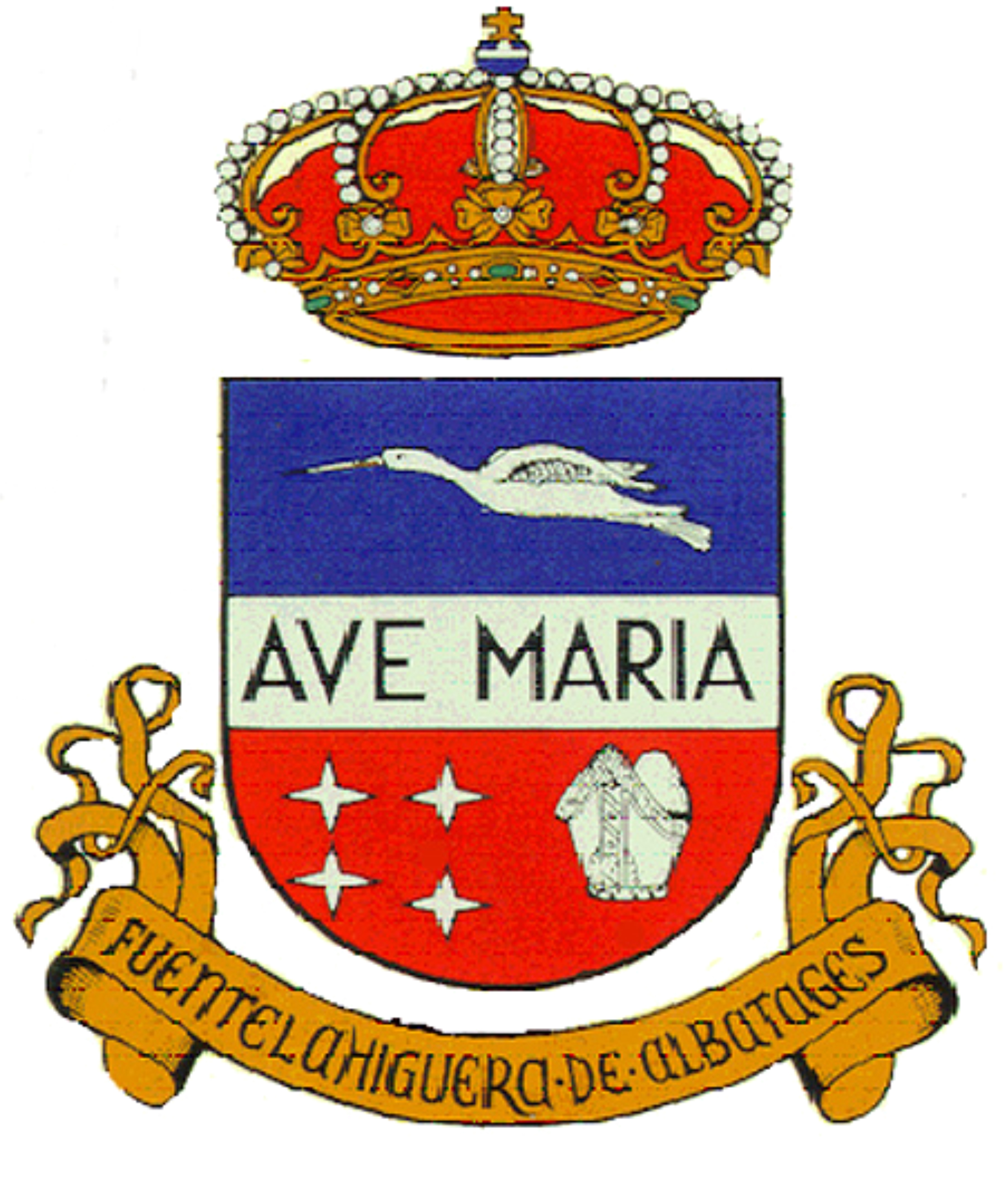
- Coat of arms

- Location within Province of Guadalajara Location within Castilla-La Mancha Location within Spain
- Coordinates: 40°47′12″N 3°18′24″W
- Country: Spain
- Autonomous community: Castile-La Mancha
- Province: Guadalajara
- Comarca: Campiña de Guadalajara

Area
  - Total: 52.41 km^{2} (20.24 sq mi)
- Elevation: 901 m (2,956 ft)

Population (2025-01-01)
  - Total: 121
  - Density: 2.31/km^{2} (5.98/sq mi)
- Time zone: UTC+1 (CET)
  - Summer (DST): UTC+2 (CEST)

Fuentelahiguera de Albatages is a municipality located in the province of Guadalajara, Castile-La Mancha, Spain. According to the 2004 census (INE), the municipality has a population of 156 inhabitants.
