= Valdarachas =

Valdarachas, Spain
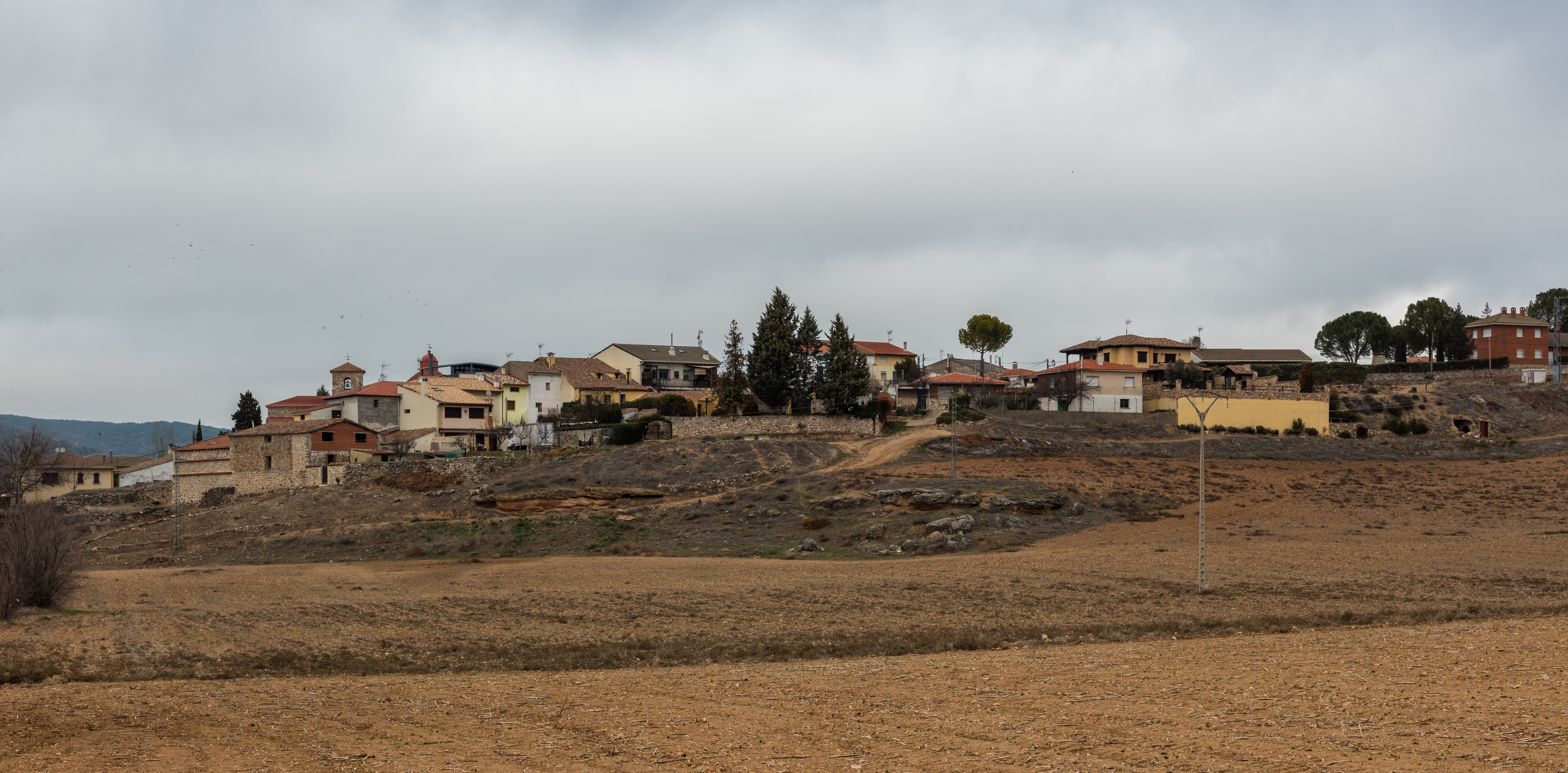

- Location within Province of Guadalajara Location within Castilla-La Mancha Location within Spain
- Coordinates: 40°31′04″N 3°07′31″W
- Country: Spain
- Autonomous community: Castile-La Mancha
- Province: Guadalajara
- Municipality: Valdarachas

Area
  - Total: 10 km^{2} (3.9 sq mi)

Population (2025-01-01)
  - Total: 67
  - Density: 6.7/km^{2} (17/sq mi)
- Time zone: UTC+1 (CET)
  - Summer (DST): UTC+2 (CEST)

Valdarachas is a municipality located in the province of Guadalajara, Castile-La Mancha, Spain. According to the 2004 census (INE), the municipality has a population of 28 inhabitants.

== Mayorazgo de Valdarachas ==
Don José de Medrano y Rosales Maldonado y Medrano, born in Ciudad Real in 1879, inherited the position of the ninth owner of the Mayorazgo de Valdarachas. After his death, his marriage to his first cousin, Doña Teresa de Rosales y del Forcallo, resulted in a sole daughter and heir: Doña María Teresa de Medrano y Rosales, who married Don José María Henríquez de Luna y Baillo in 1949, became the tenth owner of the Mayorazgo de Valdarachas.
