= Algora =

Algora, Spain
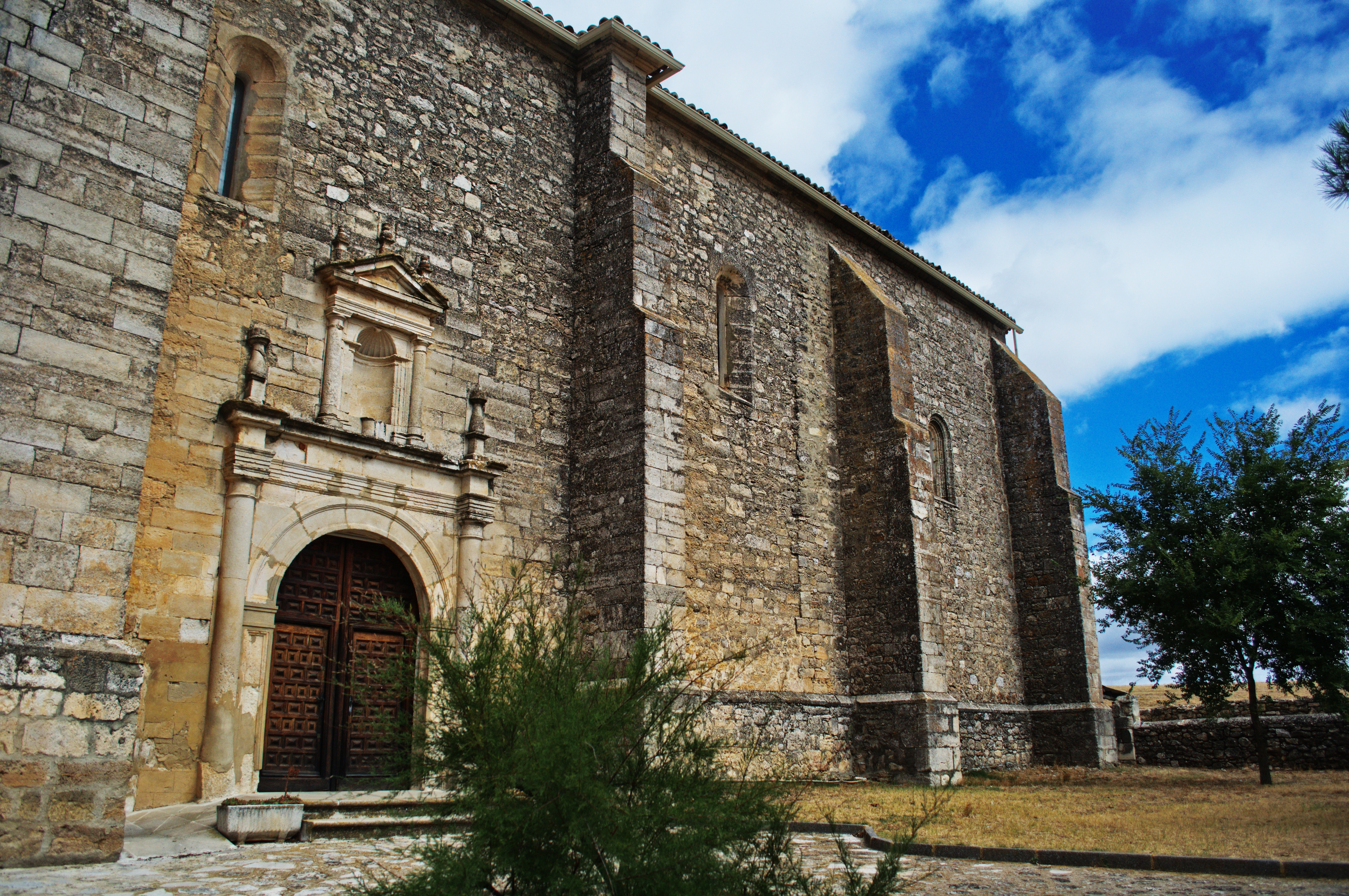

- Coat of arms

- Location within Province of Guadalajara Location within Castilla-La Mancha Location within Spain
- Coordinates: 40°57′51″N 2°39′55″W
- Country: Spain
- Autonomous community: Castile-La Mancha
- Province: Guadalajara
- Municipality: Algora

Area
  - Total: 47 km^{2} (18 sq mi)

Population (2025-01-01)
  - Total: 89
  - Density: 1.9/km^{2} (4.9/sq mi)
- Time zone: UTC+1 (CET)
  - Summer (DST): UTC+2 (CEST)

Algora is a municipality located in the province of Guadalajara, Castile-La Mancha, Spain. According to the 2004 census (INE), the municipality has a population of 112 inhabitants.

A Cenomanian (100.5 – 93.9 million years ago) fossil site has been found nearby, with sandy sediments showing the effect of tides. Vertebrate fauna found at the site include specimens originating from the supercontinent Gondwana as well as from Laurasia.
