= Hiendelaencina =

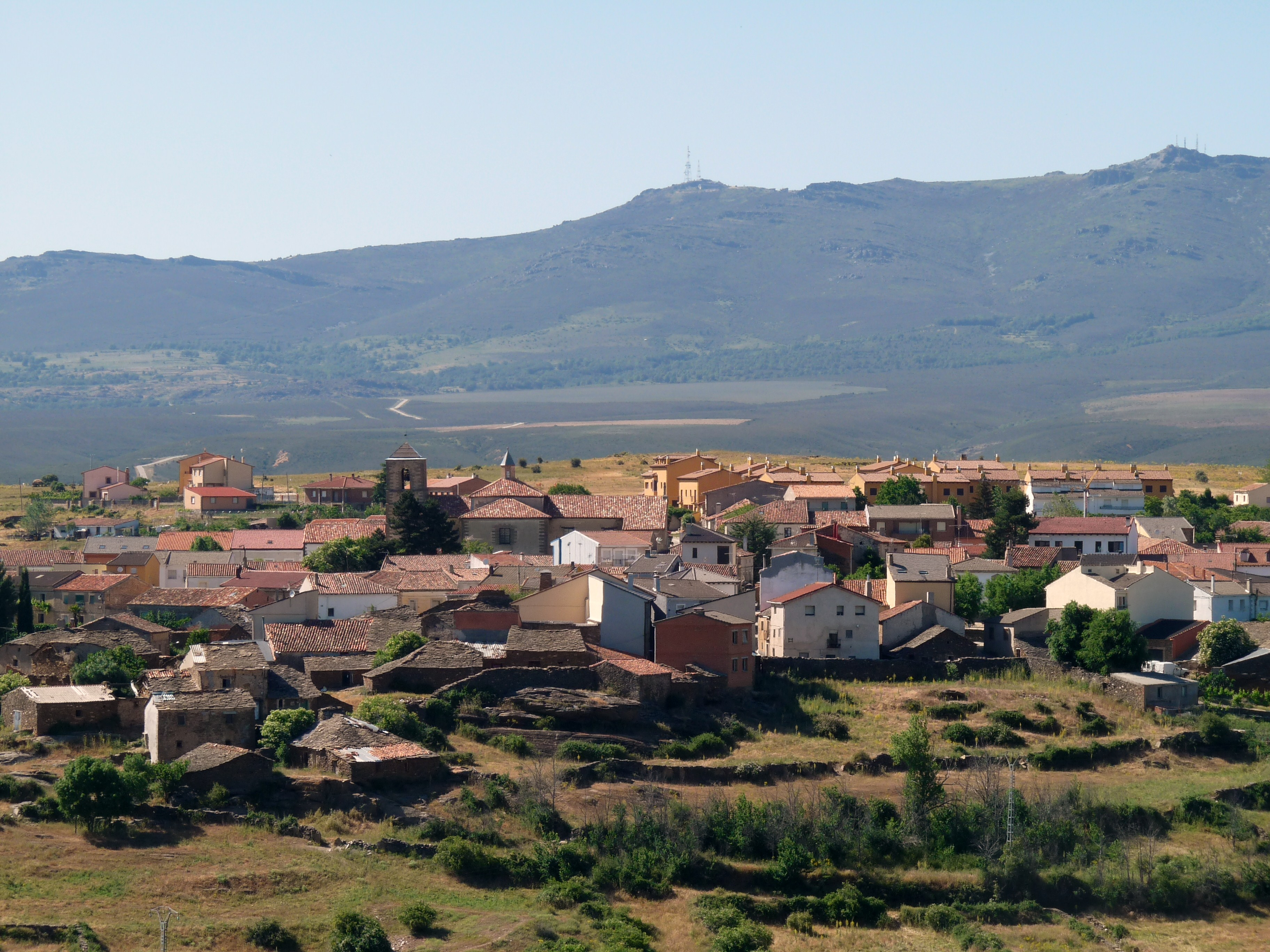
- View of Hiendelaencina.

- Coat of arms

- Location of Hiendelaencina within Spain Hiendelaencina (Castilla-La Mancha) Hiendelaencina (Spain)
- Coordinates: 41°5′5″N 3°0′8″W
- Country: Spain
- Autonomous community: Castile-La Mancha
- Province: Guadalajara
- Municipality: Hiendelaencina

Area
  - Total: 19.22 km^{2} (7.42 sq mi)
- Elevation: 1,084 m (3,556 ft)

Population (2025-01-01)
  - Total: 107
  - Density: 5.57/km^{2} (14.4/sq mi)
- Time zone: UTC+1 (CET)
  - Summer (DST): UTC+2 (CEST)

Hiendelaencina is a municipality located in the province of Guadalajara, Castile-La Mancha, Spain. According to the 2004 census (INE), the municipality had a population of 131 inhabitants.
