= Establés =

Establés, Spain
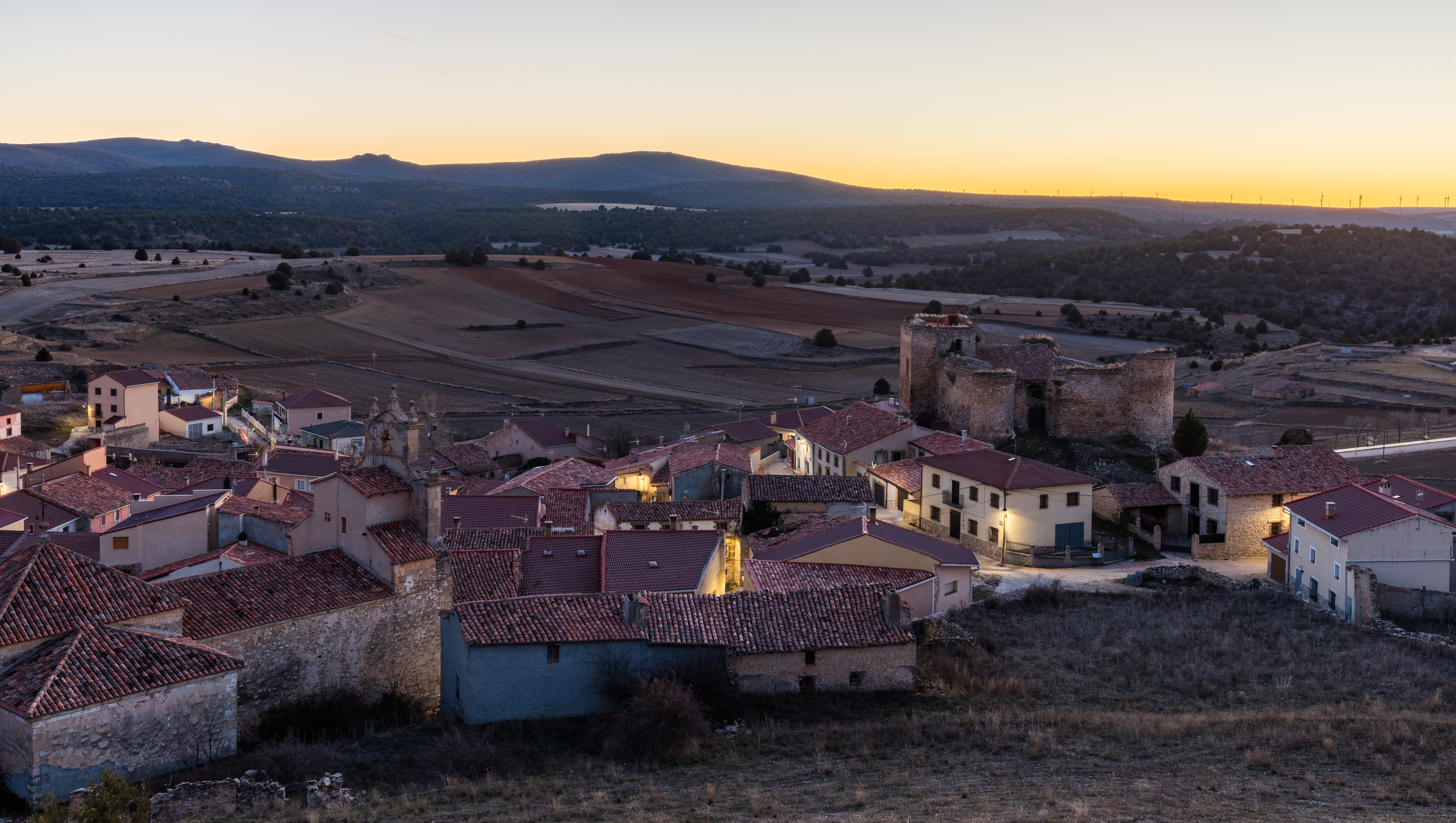

- Location within Province of Guadalajara Location within Castilla-La Mancha Location within Spain
- Coordinates: 41°00′33″N 2°01′22″W
- Country: Spain
- Autonomous community: Castile-La Mancha
- Province: Guadalajara
- Municipality: Establés

Area
  - Total: 52 km^{2} (20 sq mi)

Population (2025-01-01)
  - Total: 35
  - Density: 0.67/km^{2} (1.7/sq mi)
- Time zone: UTC+1 (CET)
  - Summer (DST): UTC+2 (CEST)

Establés (Spanish pronunciation: [estaˈβles]) is a municipality located in the province of Guadalajara, Castile-La Mancha, Spain. According to the 2004 census (INE), the municipality has a population of 55 inhabitants. Establés postal code is 19287.
