= Torrecuadradilla =

Torrecuadradilla, Spain
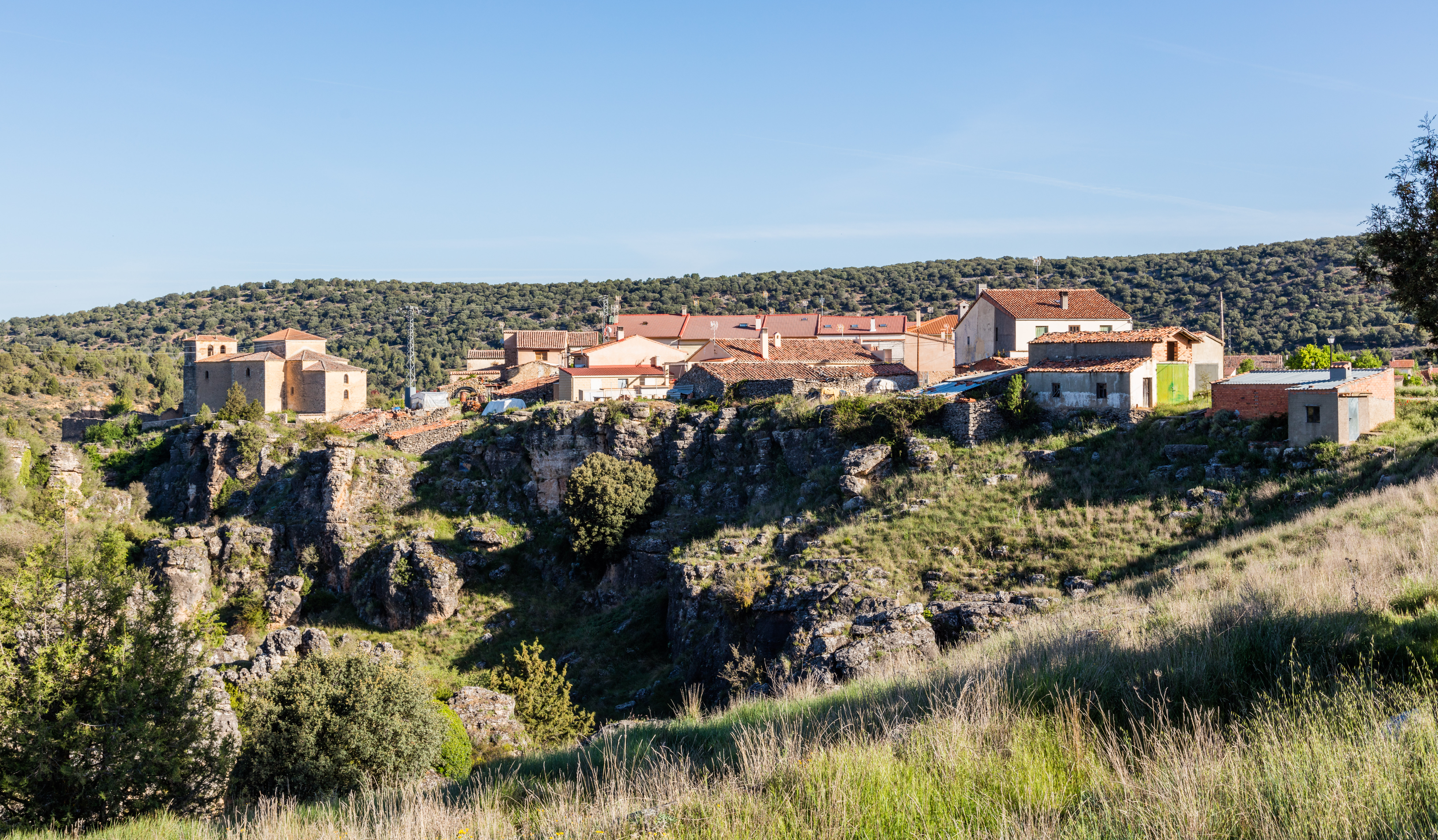

- Location within Province of Guadalajara Location within Castilla-La Mancha Location within Spain
- Coordinates: 40°51′13″N 2°31′55″W
- Country: Spain
- Autonomous community: Castile-La Mancha
- Province: Guadalajara
- Municipality: Torrecuadradilla

Area
  - Total: 33 km^{2} (13 sq mi)

Population (2025-01-01)
  - Total: 26
  - Density: 0.79/km^{2} (2.0/sq mi)
- Time zone: UTC+1 (CET)
  - Summer (DST): UTC+2 (CEST)

Torrecuadradilla is a municipality located in the province of Guadalajara, Castile-La Mancha, Spain. According to the 2004 census (INE), the municipality has a population of 51 inhabitants.
