= Alocén =

Alocén, Spain
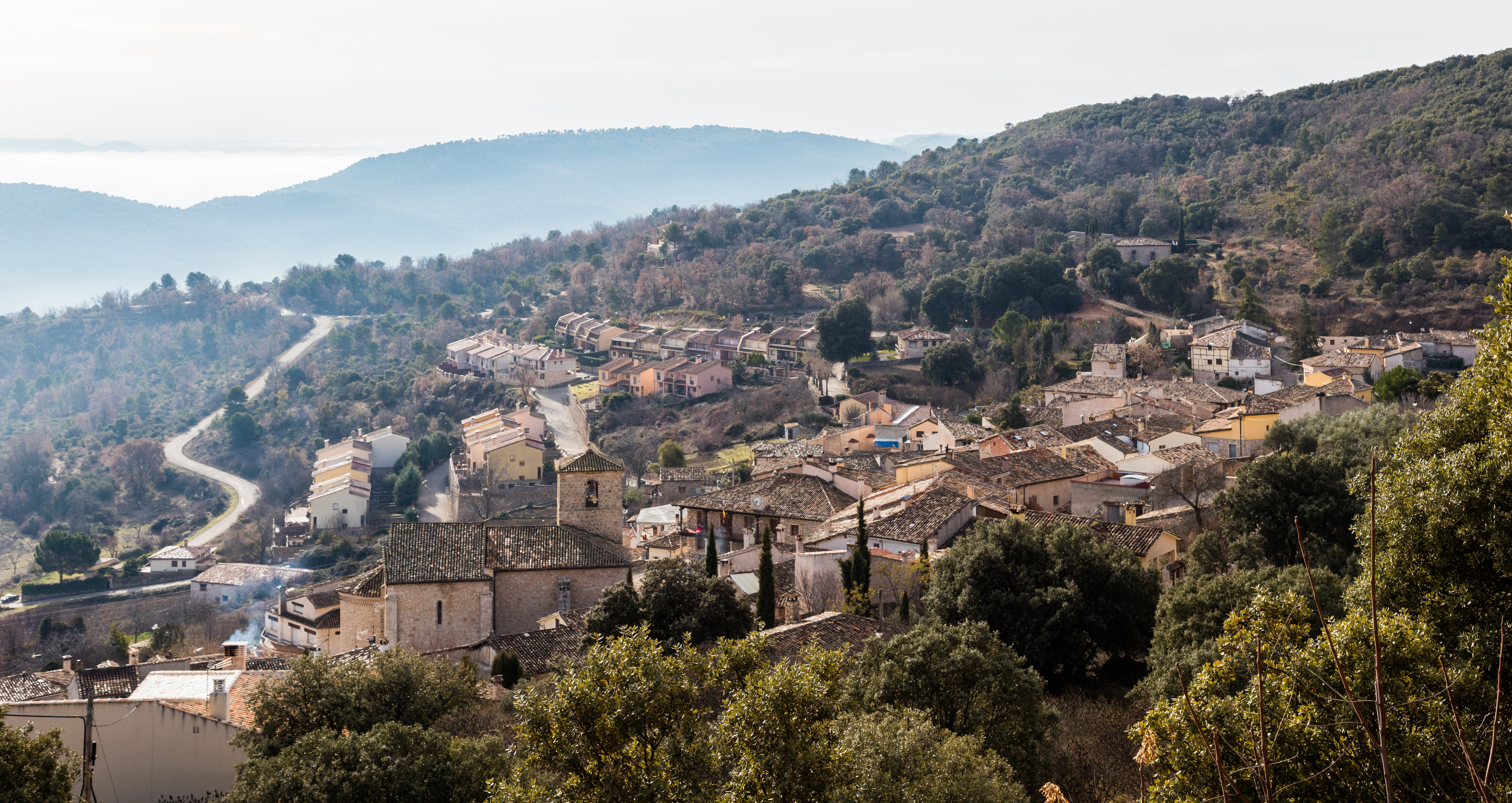

- Coat of arms

- Location within Province of Guadalajara Location within Castilla-La Mancha Location within Spain
- Coordinates: 40°34′33″N 2°44′56″W
- Country: Spain
- Autonomous community: Castile-La Mancha
- Province: Guadalajara
- Municipality: Alocén

Area
  - Total: 17 km^{2} (6.6 sq mi)

Population (2025-01-01)
  - Total: 151
  - Density: 8.9/km^{2} (23/sq mi)
- Time zone: UTC+1 (CET)
  - Summer (DST): UTC+2 (CEST)

Alocén is a municipality located in the province of Guadalajara, Castile-La Mancha, Spain. According to the 2004 census (INE), the municipality has a population of 179 inhabitants.
