= La Mierla =

La Mierla, Spain
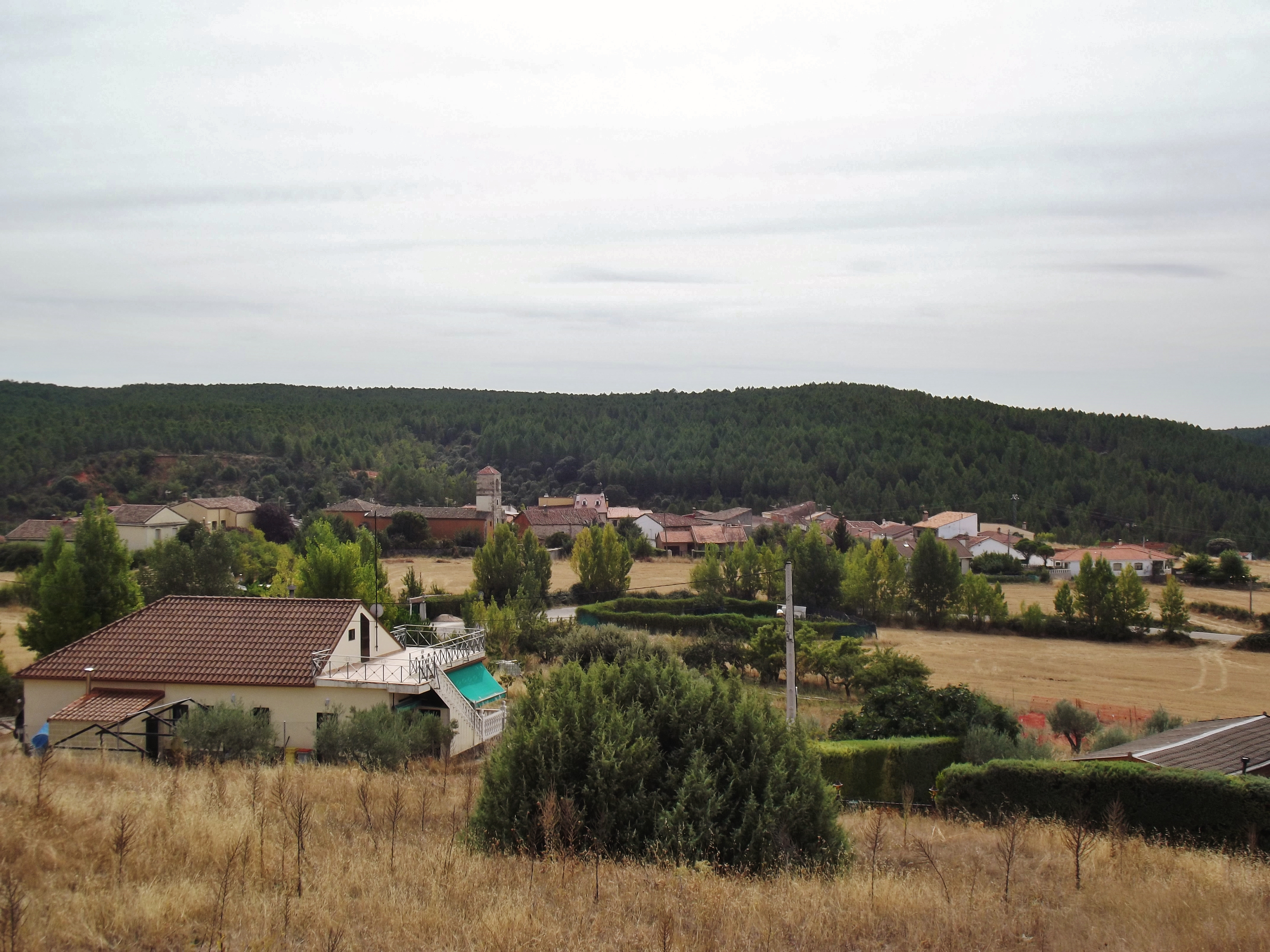

- Location within Province of Guadalajara Location within Castilla-La Mancha Location within Spain
- Country: Spain
- Autonomous community: Castile-La Mancha
- Province: Guadalajara
- Municipality: La Mierla

Area
  - Total: 19 km^{2} (7.3 sq mi)

Population (2025-01-01)
  - Total: 44
  - Density: 2.3/km^{2} (6.0/sq mi)
- Time zone: UTC+1 (CET)
  - Summer (DST): UTC+2 (CEST)

La Mierla is a municipality located in the province of Guadalajara, Castile-La Mancha, Spain. According to the 2004 census (INE), the municipality had a population of 27 inhabitants.
