= Hontoba =

Hontoba, Spain
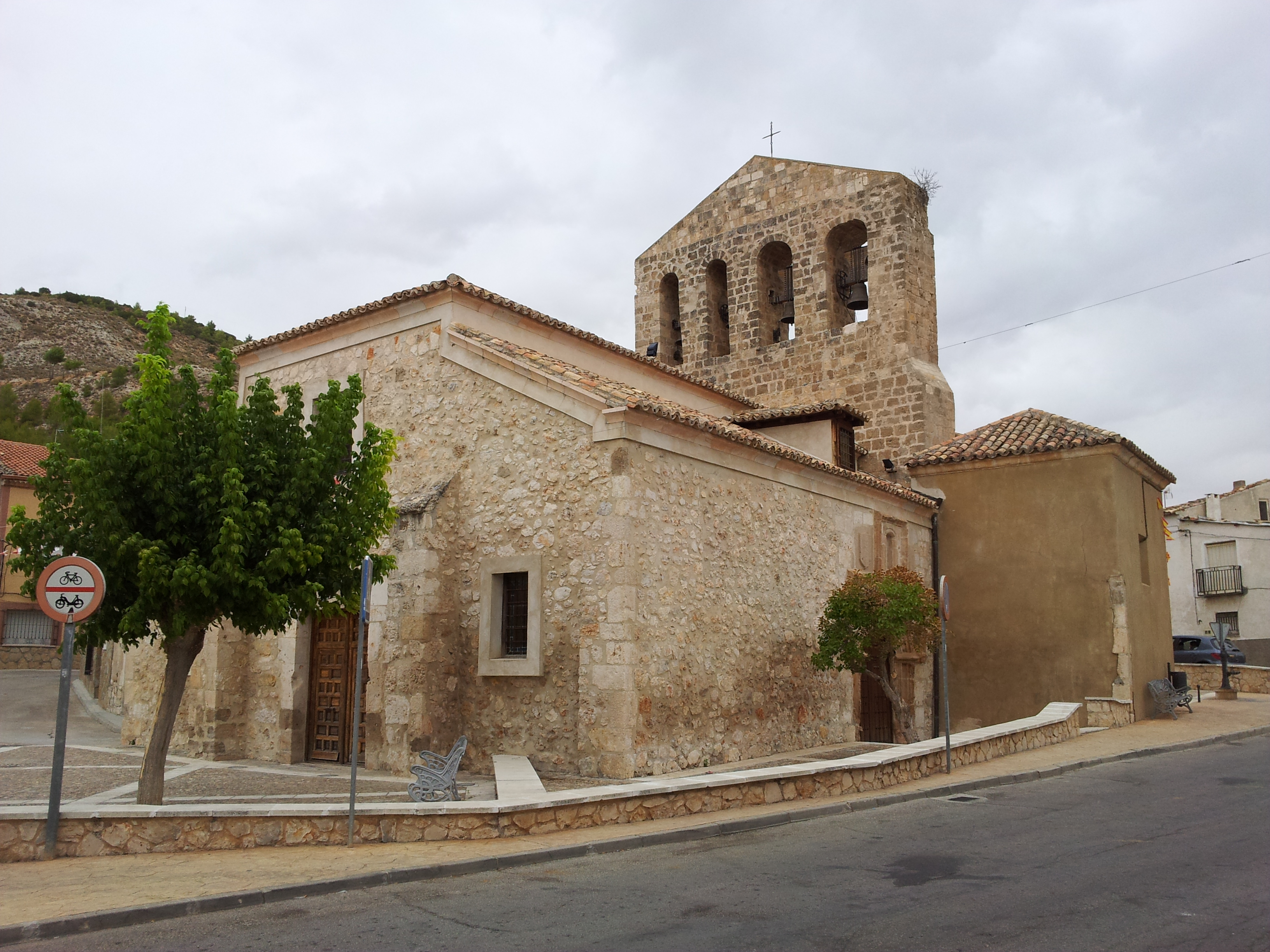

- Flag Coat of arms

- Location within Province of Guadalajara Location within Castilla-La Mancha Location within Spain
- Country: Spain
- Autonomous community: Castile-La Mancha
- Province: Guadalajara
- Municipality: Hontoba

Area
  - Total: 32 km^{2} (12 sq mi)

Population (2025-01-01)
  - Total: 475
  - Density: 15/km^{2} (38/sq mi)
- Time zone: UTC+1 (CET)
  - Summer (DST): UTC+2 (CEST)

Hontoba is a municipality located in the province of Guadalajara, Spain. According to the 2008 census (INE), the municipality has a population of 336 inhabitants.
