= Castilnuevo =

Castilnuevo, Spain
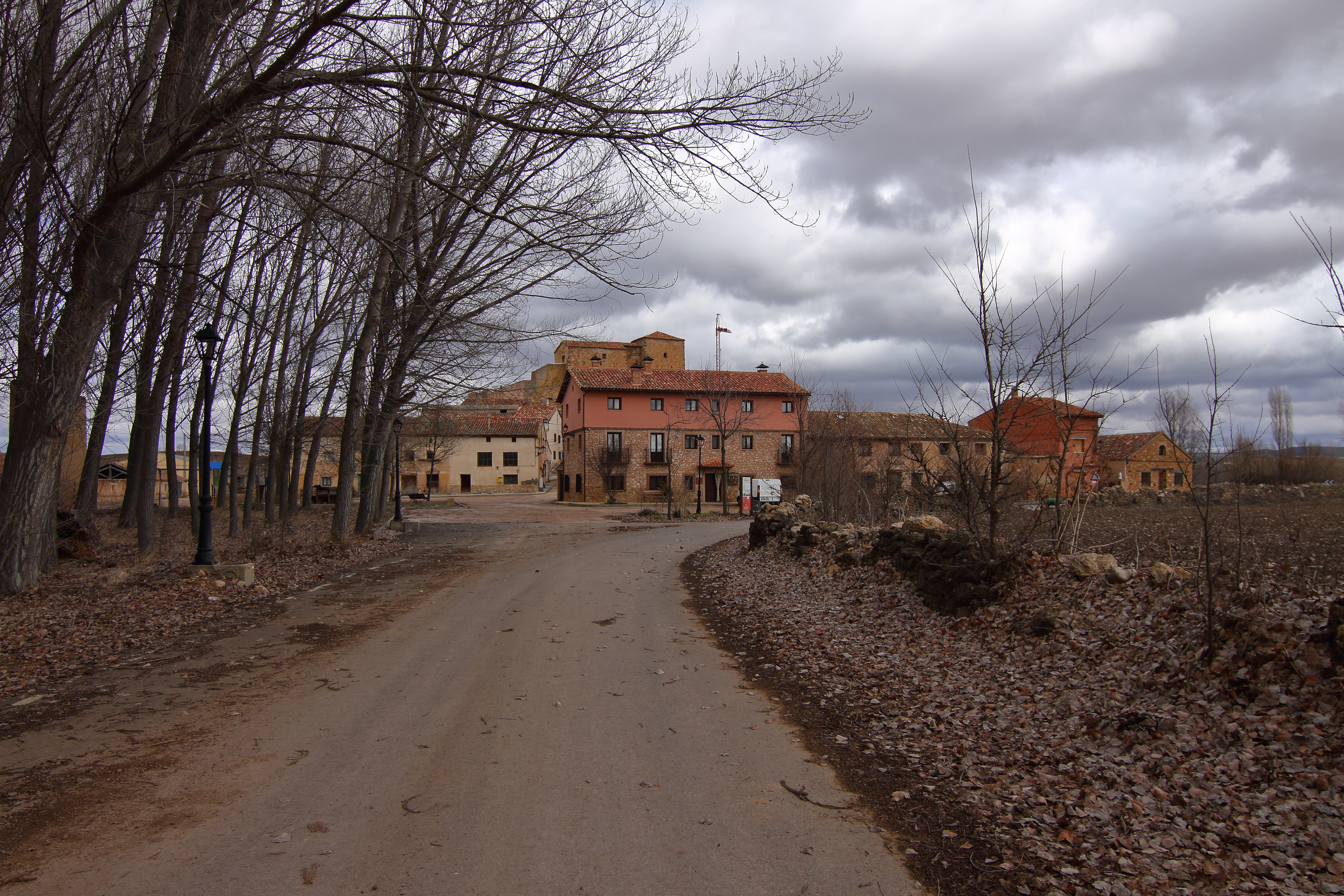

- Location within Province of Guadalajara Location within Castilla-La Mancha Location within Spain
- Coordinates: 40°48′56″N 1°51′23″W
- Country: Spain
- Autonomous community: Castile-La Mancha
- Province: Guadalajara
- Municipality: Castilnuevo

Area
  - Total: 19.54 km^{2} (7.54 sq mi)

Population (2025-01-01)
  - Total: 8
  - Density: 0.41/km^{2} (1.1/sq mi)
- Time zone: UTC+1 (CET)
  - Summer (DST): UTC+2 (CEST)

Castilnuevo is a municipality in the province of Guadalajara, Castile-La Mancha, Spain. It had 9 residents at the 2004 census (INE).
