= Pozo de Almoguera =

Pozo de Almoguera, Spain
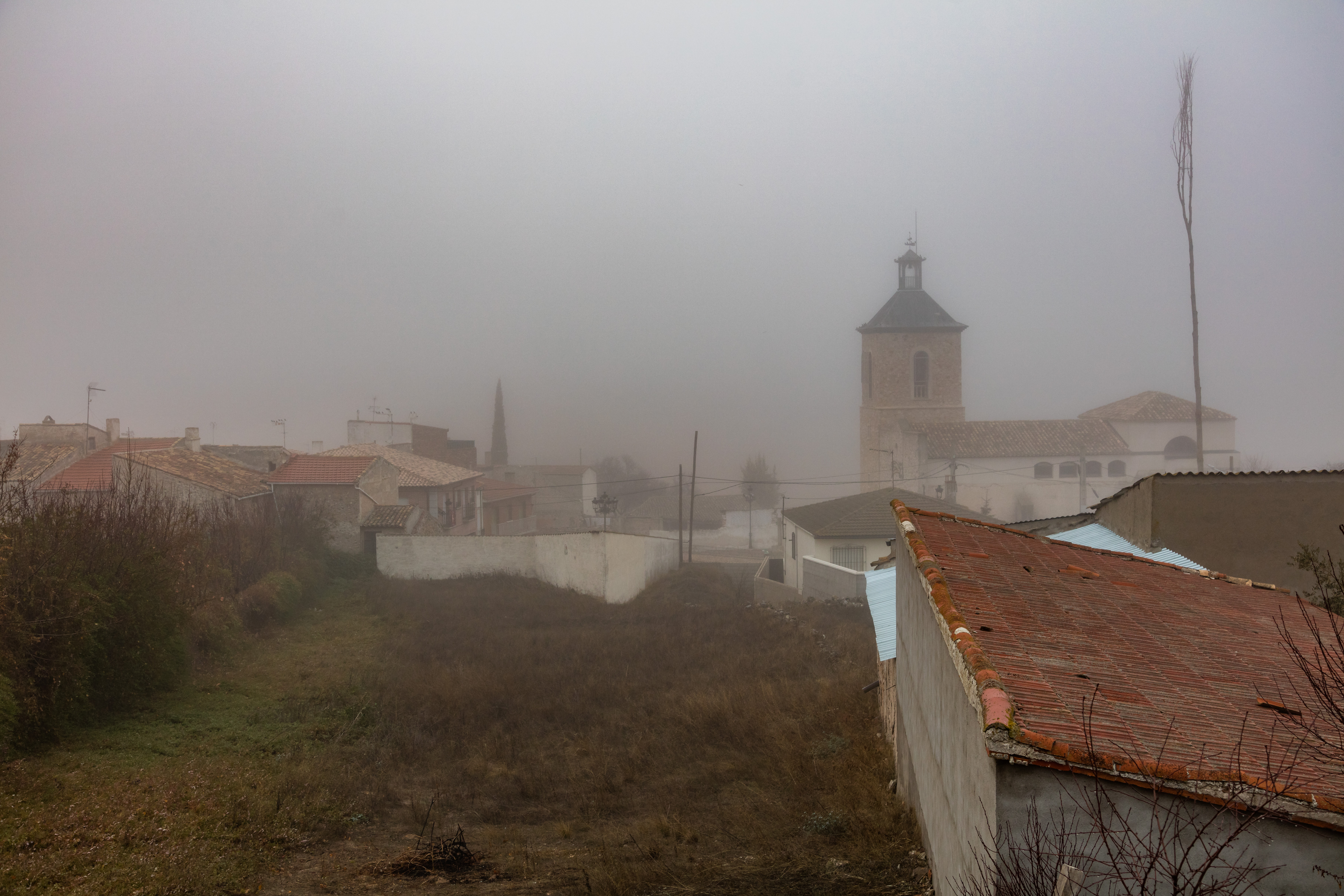

- Coat of arms

- Location within Province of Guadalajara Location within Castilla-La Mancha Location within Spain
- Country: Spain
- Autonomous community: Castile-La Mancha
- Province: Guadalajara
- Municipality: Pozo de Almoguera

Area
  - Total: 16 km^{2} (6.2 sq mi)

Population (2025-01-01)
  - Total: 110
  - Density: 6.9/km^{2} (18/sq mi)
- Time zone: UTC+1 (CET)
  - Summer (DST): UTC+2 (CEST)

Pozo de Almoguera is a municipality located in the province of Guadalajara, Spain. According to the 2004 census (INE), the municipality has a population of 154 inhabitants.
