= Hortezuela de Océn =

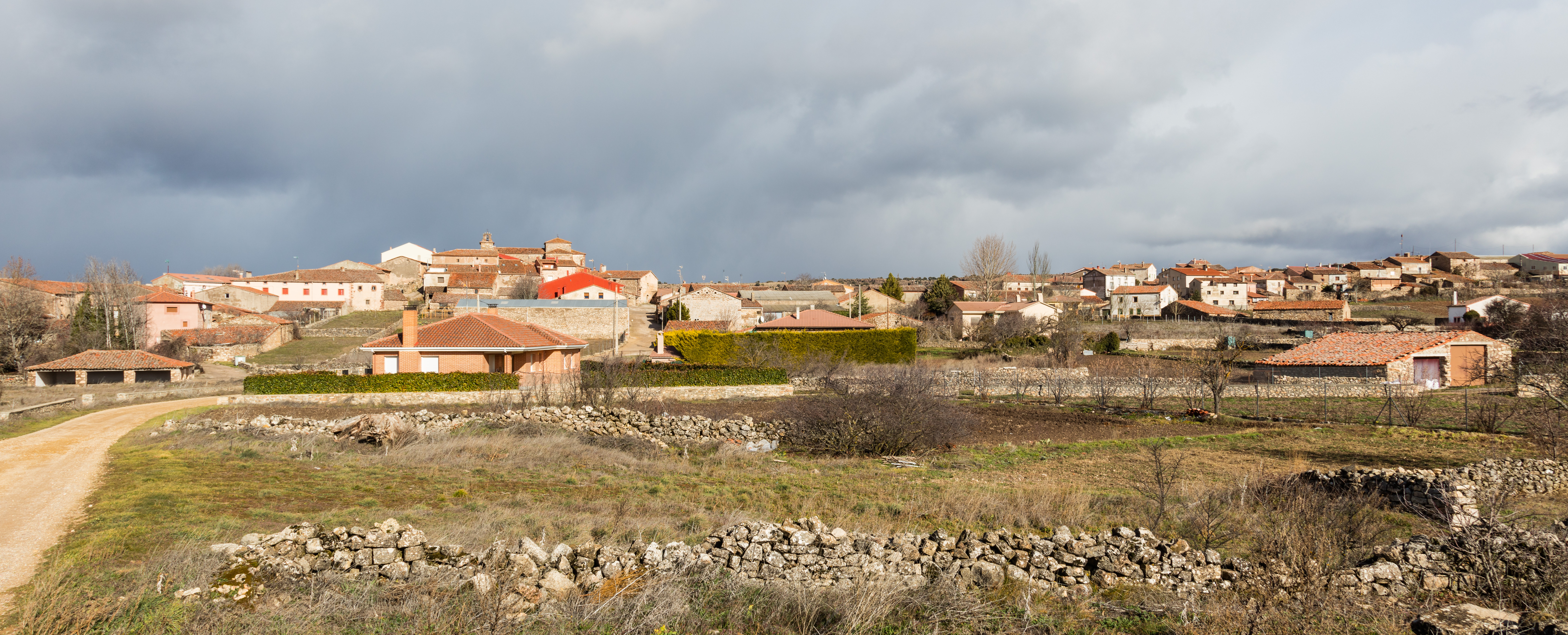

- Location within Province of Guadalajara Location within Castilla-La Mancha Location within Spain
- Coordinates: 40°58′N 2°25′W
- Country: Spain
- Autonomous community: Castile-La Mancha
- Province: Guadalajara
- Municipality: Hortezuela de Océn

Area
  - Total: 20 km^{2} (7.7 sq mi)

Population (2025-01-01)
  - Total: 32
  - Density: 1.6/km^{2} (4.1/sq mi)
- Time zone: UTC+1 (CET)
  - Summer (DST): UTC+2 (CEST)

Hortezuela de Océn is a municipality located in the province of Guadalajara, Castile-La Mancha, Spain. According to the 2004 census (INE), the municipality has a population of 78 inhabitants.
