= Fadrique de Portugal =

Portuguese politician and cleric

- Archbishop of Zaragoza
- Archdiocese: Roman Catholic Archdiocese of Zaragoza
- Appointed: 1532
- Term ended: 1539
- Predecessor: Juan de Aragón II
- Successor: Hernando de Aragón

Orders
- Consecration: 5 May 1503

Personal details
- Born: c. 1465 Vila Viçosa, Kingdom of Portugal
- Died: 15 January 1539 Barcelona, Crown of Aragon, Kingdom of Spain
- Parents: Afonso, 1st Count of Faro; Maria de Noronha e Sousa, 2nd Countess of Odemira

Fadrique de Portugal (c. 1465 – 15 January 1539) was a Portuguese-born prelate and statesman who served as the Viceroy of Catalonia and the Archbishop of Zaragoza. A trusted advisor to the Catholic Monarchs, he was a witness to the last will of Isabella I of Castile and later served as a royal counselor to both Ferdinand II of Aragon and Charles I of Spain.

== Biography ==
Born around 1465 in Vila Viçosa, Fadrique de Portugal was a son of Afonso, 1st Count of Faro, and Maria de Noronha e Sousa, 2nd Countess of Odemira. He was a patrilineal great-grandson of Afonso I, Duke of Braganza, an illegitimate son of King John I of Portugal, as well as a descendant of King Henry II of Castile and Ferdinand I of Portugal. He studied law and canon law.

He had a close relationship with Queen Isabella I of Castile and was with her in her final hours, signing her last will and testament as a witness. After her death, he became a counselor of her widower, King Ferdinand II of Aragon. Due to his commitment to the royal family, the Archbishop strongly supported Isabella and Ferdinand's daughter Joanna upon her accession to her parents' thrones and also supported the accession of her son, Charles I, as her co-ruler. King Charles I kept him as royal counselor.

He started his ecclesiastical career as canon of Segorbe and Albarracin, becoming bishop of Calahorra in 1503 and remaining in that post until 1508, when he was named bishop of Segovia. He served as such until 1511. In 1512, he became bishop of Sigüenza. Charles I appointed him viceroy of Catalonia and captain-general of Catalonia, Cerdanya and Roussillon in 1525. He produced numerous works and commissioned the decoration of several churches. Finally, in 1532, he was made archbishop of Zaragoza, but he never visited the city itself.

He died in Barcelona on 15 January 1539 and was transferred to the Cathedral of Santa Maria de Sigüenza, where he was buried in the mausoleum that bears his name.

Catholic Church titles
Preceded by Juan Ortega Bravo de la Laguna	Bishop of Calahorra; 1503–1508	Succeeded by Juan Fernández de Velasco
Preceded by Juan Ruiz de Medina	Bishop of Segovia; 1508–1511	Succeeded by Diego Ribera de Toledo
Preceded by Bernardino López de Carvajal	Bishop of Sigüenza; 1512–1532	Succeeded by García de Loaysa
Preceded by Juan de Aragón	Archbishop of Zaragoza; 1532–1539	Succeeded by Hernando de Aragón
Political offices
Vacant Title last held by Antonio de Zúñiga	Viceroy of Catalonia; 1525–1539	Succeeded by Francis Borgia
