= Juan Soreda =

Spanish painter

- Died: 1537
- Notable work: Martyrdom of Pelagius of Córdoba

Juan Soreda (died in August 1537) was a Spanish Renaissance painter, working in Sigüenza, Valladolid and Burgo de Osma-Ciudad de Osma. Soreda is mentioned as Fernando del Rincón's companion in 1506.

== Works ==
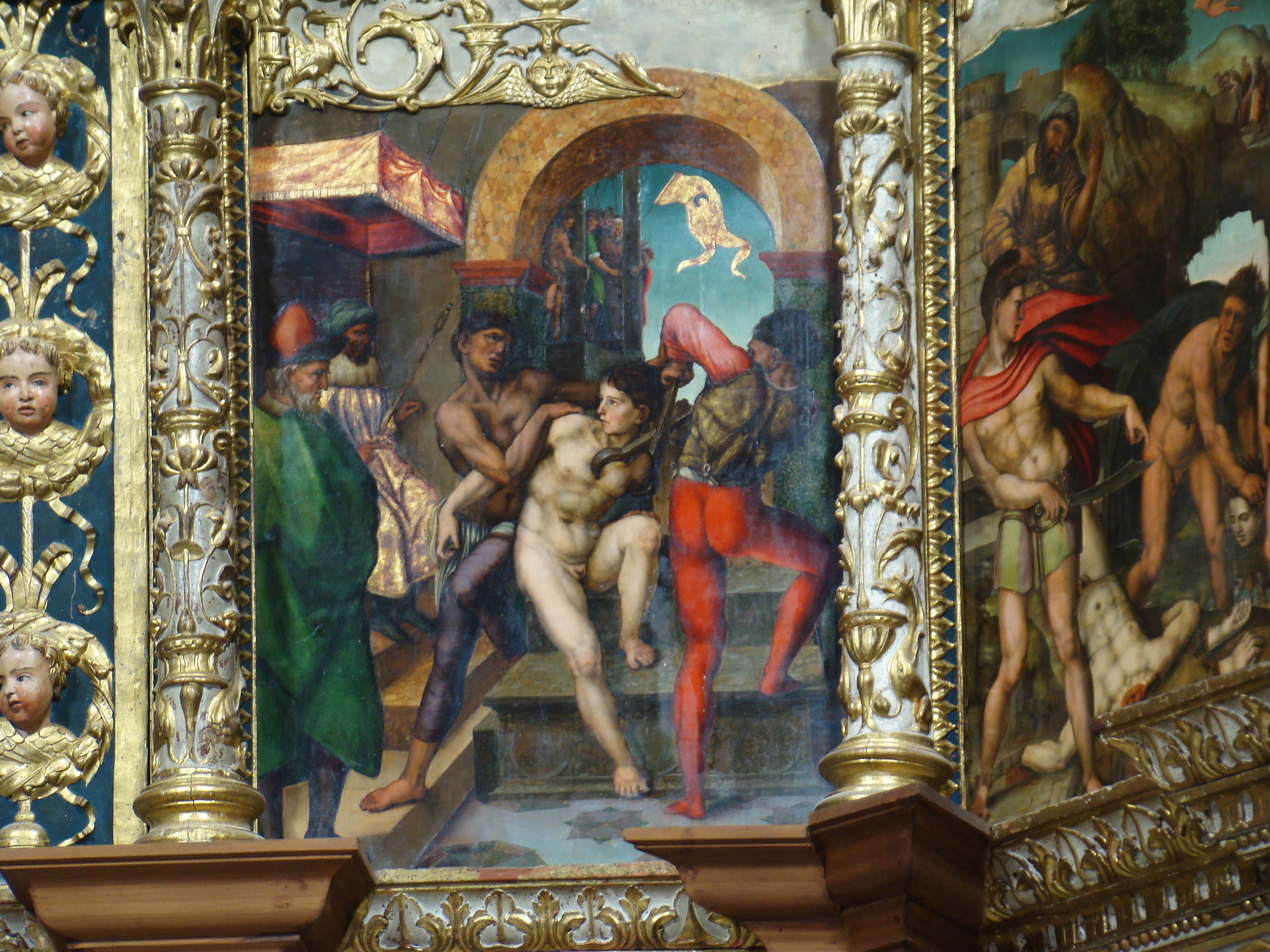
Martyrdom of Pelagius of Córdoba

Soredaʻs works, depicting Annunciation, Visitation, Presentation of Jesus at the Temple and Crucifixion of Jesus are located in the church in Torremocha del Pinar, where depiction of Jesus’ circumcision also exist, attributed to Soreda or Pedro de la Puente. For the Sigüenza Cathedral, Soreda depicted Saint Librada, whose cult was confused with Wilgefortis’ cult. The most famous work by Soreda is depiction of Saint Pelagius in the church dedicated to the saint—Iglesia de San Pelayo in Olivares de Duero. He depicted Luisa de Medrano, poet, philosopher, and the first female professor at the University of Salamanca.
