= Diego Ribera de Toledo =

Spanish Roman Catholic prelate

Most Reverend Diego Ribera de Toledo
- Bishop of Segovia
- Church: Catholic Church
- Diocese: Diocese of Segovia
- In office: 1511–1543
- Predecessor: Fadrique de Portugal Noreña
- Successor: Antonio Ramírez de Haro
- Previous post: Bishop of Mallorca (1507–1508)

Personal details
- Died: 6 February 1543 Segovia, Spain

Diego Ribera de Toledo (died 6 February 1543) was a Roman Catholic prelate who served as Bishop of Segovia (1511–1543) and Bishop of Mallorca (1507–1508).

== Biography ==
On 22 December 1507, Diego Ribera de Toledo was appointed by the King of Spain and confirmed by Pope Julius II as Bishop of Mallorca. In 1508, he was consecrated bishop by Adrianus Appelkeren, Titular Bishop of Sebaste in Cilicia. On 29 October 1511, he was appointed by Pope Julius II as Bishop of Segovia. He served as Bishop of Segovia until his death on 6 February 1543. While bishop, he was the principal consecrator of Adriaan Florenszoom Dedel, Bishop of Tortosa; and Juan de Zumárraga, Bishop of México.

== External links and additional sources ==
- Cheney, David M. "Diocese of Mallorca". Catholic-Hierarchy.org. (for Chronology of Bishops) ^{[self-published]}
- Chow, Gabriel. "Diocese of Mallorca (Spain)". GCatholic.org. (for Chronology of Bishops) ^{[self-published]}
- Cheney, David M. "Diocese of Segovia". Catholic-Hierarchy.org. (for Chronology of Bishops) ^{[self-published]}
- Chow, Gabriel. "Diocese of Segovia (Spain)". GCatholic.org. (for Chronology of Bishops) ^{[self-published]}

Catholic Church titles
Preceded by Antonio de Rojas Manrique	Bishop of Mallorca; 1507–1508	Succeeded by Rodrigo Sánchez Mercado
Preceded by Fadrique de Portugal Noreña	Bishop of Segovia; 1511–1543	Succeeded by Antonio Ramírez de Haro
