= Sigüenza Cathedral =

Cathedral of Santa María de Sigüenza
- Catedral de Santa María de Sigüenza (Spanish)
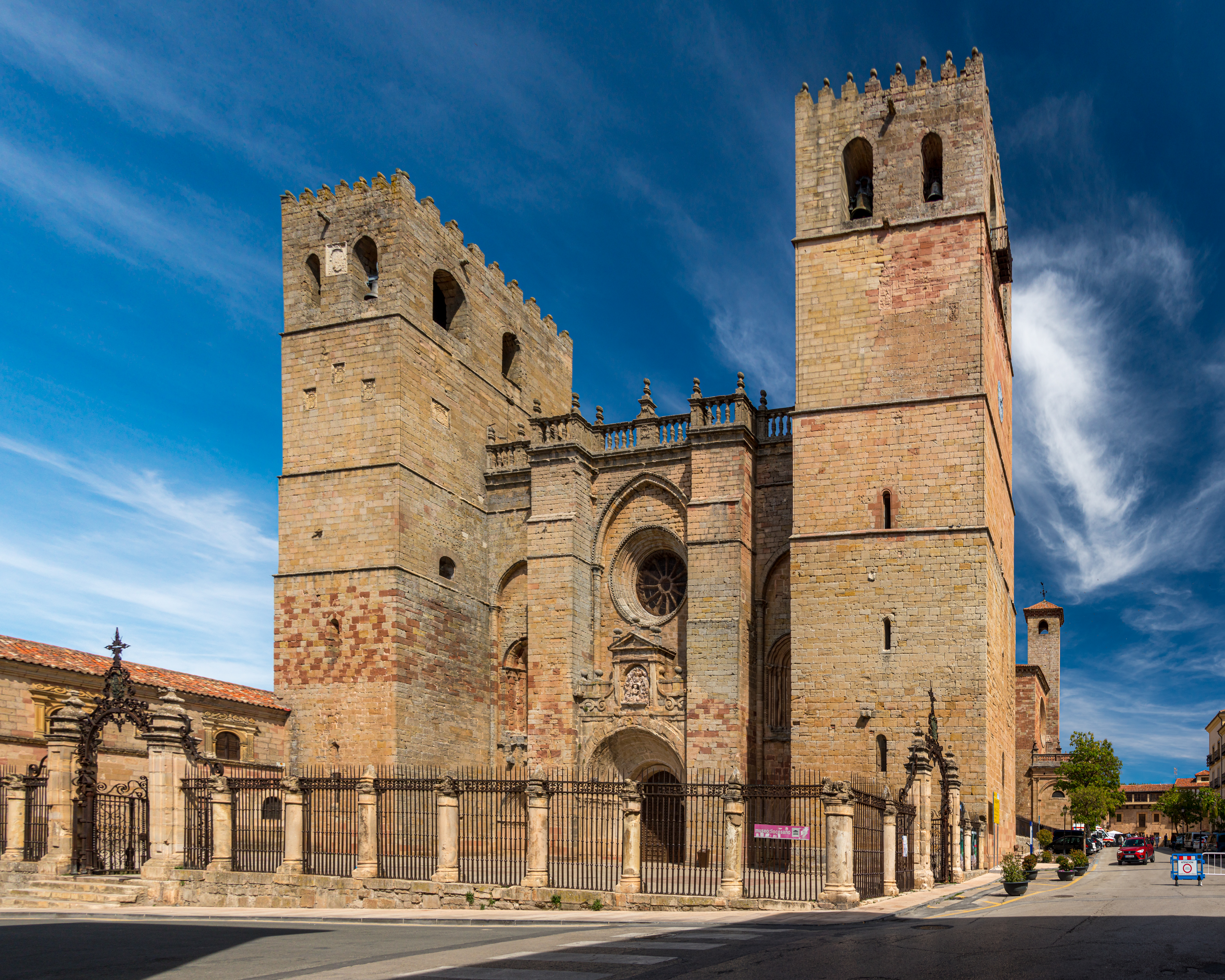

- Location within Spain
- 41.068411°N 2.641267°W
- Location: Sigüenza, Castile-La Mancha, Spain

Site notes
- Governing body: Roman Catholic Church

Spanish Cultural Heritage
- Official name: Catedral de Santa María de Sigüenza
- Type: Non-movable
- Criteria: Monument
- Designated: 1931
- Reference no.: RI-51-0000599

The Cathedral of Sigüenza, officially Catedral de Santa María de Sigüenza, is the seat of the bishop of Sigüenza, in the town of Sigüenza, in Castile-La Mancha, Spain. It was declared Bien de Interés Cultural in 1931.

It is dedicated to Santa María la Mayor (the Virgin Mary), the patron saint of the city of Sigüenza. It dates to January 1124 when the bishop Bernard of Agen (1080–1152) reconquered the city from the Muslims, during the reign of Urraca of León, daughter of Alfonso VI of León and Castile. He had already been appointed bishop in 1121 by the archbishop of Toledo, Bernard of Sédirac, of the Order of Cluny. Alfonso VII of León and Castile (1126–1157) granted privileges and donations to increase the population, unifying two towns: the upper around the castle and the lower one, the Mozarabic, around the channel of the Henares River.

The Gothic central nave dates to the 15th century. In the 16th century the Romanesque lateral apses were destroyed to build the ambulatory. The two outer towers of the main facade have merlons.

== Historical context ==
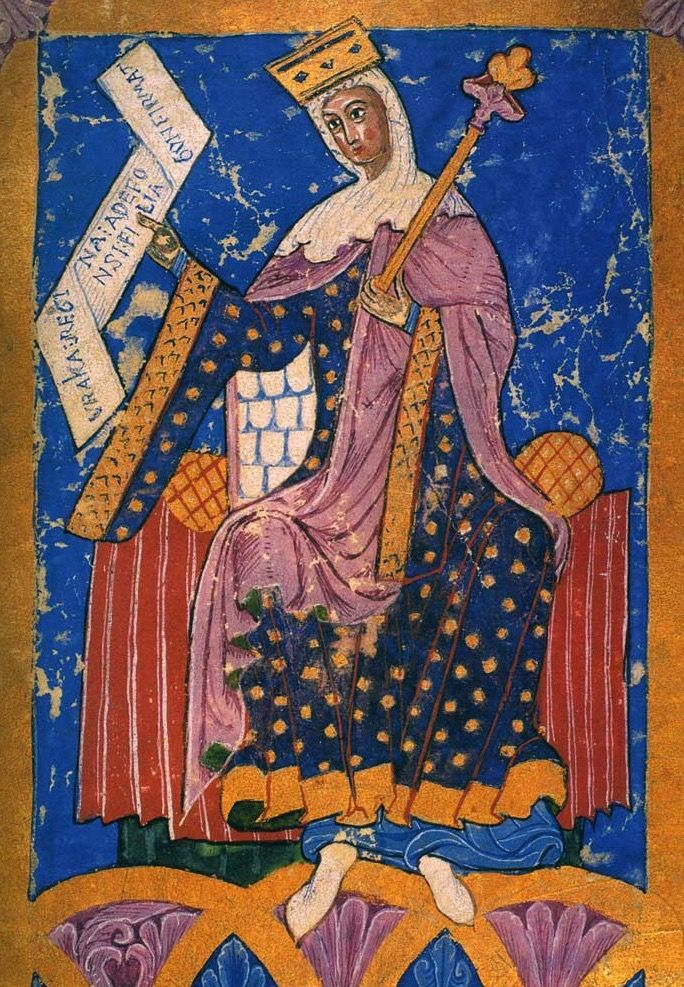
Queen Urraca was the first to grant tithes to the new bishopric of Sigüenza.

The archbishop of Toledo Bernard of Sédirac had Bernard of Agen come to his diocese of Toledo to become bishop of Sigüenza in 1121, although the city was still under the control of the Almoravids.

A letter from Queen Urraca of Leon dated February 1, 1124 granted the church and its bishop the tithe of Atienza and Medinaceli. Bernard of Agen established the "Roman rite" and suppressed the "Mozarabic rite". During his term of about thirty years, he received donations from the king Alfonso VII of León and Castile. The city was divided into the "Segontia inferior" and the "Segontia superior." After the reconquest, the two were united as a single city that passed to the Cathedral chapter.

The bishop died on the battlefield in the year 1152, succeeding him in the bishopric his nephew Peter of Leucate.

== Stages of building ==
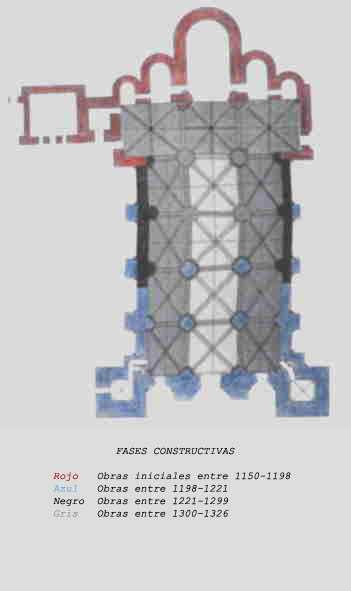
Schematic diagram of Sigüenza Cathedral

In a document of 16 September 1138 Alfonso VII of León and Castile granted the land for the church.

A document from 1144 says that Bernard of Agen rebuilt a primitive cathedral "with a double wall and tower," possibly on the remains of an old Visigothic or Mozarabic church, Santa María Antiquíssima. María del Carmen Múñoz Párraga believed that this was on the spot where the current cathedral is located.

The Romanesque temple had a floor plan of three naves and a head with five apses staggered from the sides to the much larger central one. On either side of the facade was a defense tower.

The five altars of the apses were consecrated by the end of the 12th century.

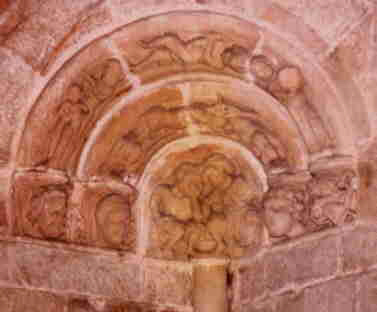
Romanesque trunk.

Under bishop Arderico (1178–1184) the Cathedral chapter was moved to the cloister. Bishop Rodrigo (1192–1221) built the wall of the main facade and the lower part of the towers. The 13th century rose window on the southern side of the transept is ornamented with arches and circles.

The Gothic central nave is from the 14th century and the rose window on the main façade from the 15th.

In 1936 during the Spanish Civil War the cathedral was damaged. From 1943 to 1949 the Segovian sculptor Florentino Trapero supervised the restoration of damaged sculptures.

== Exterior ==
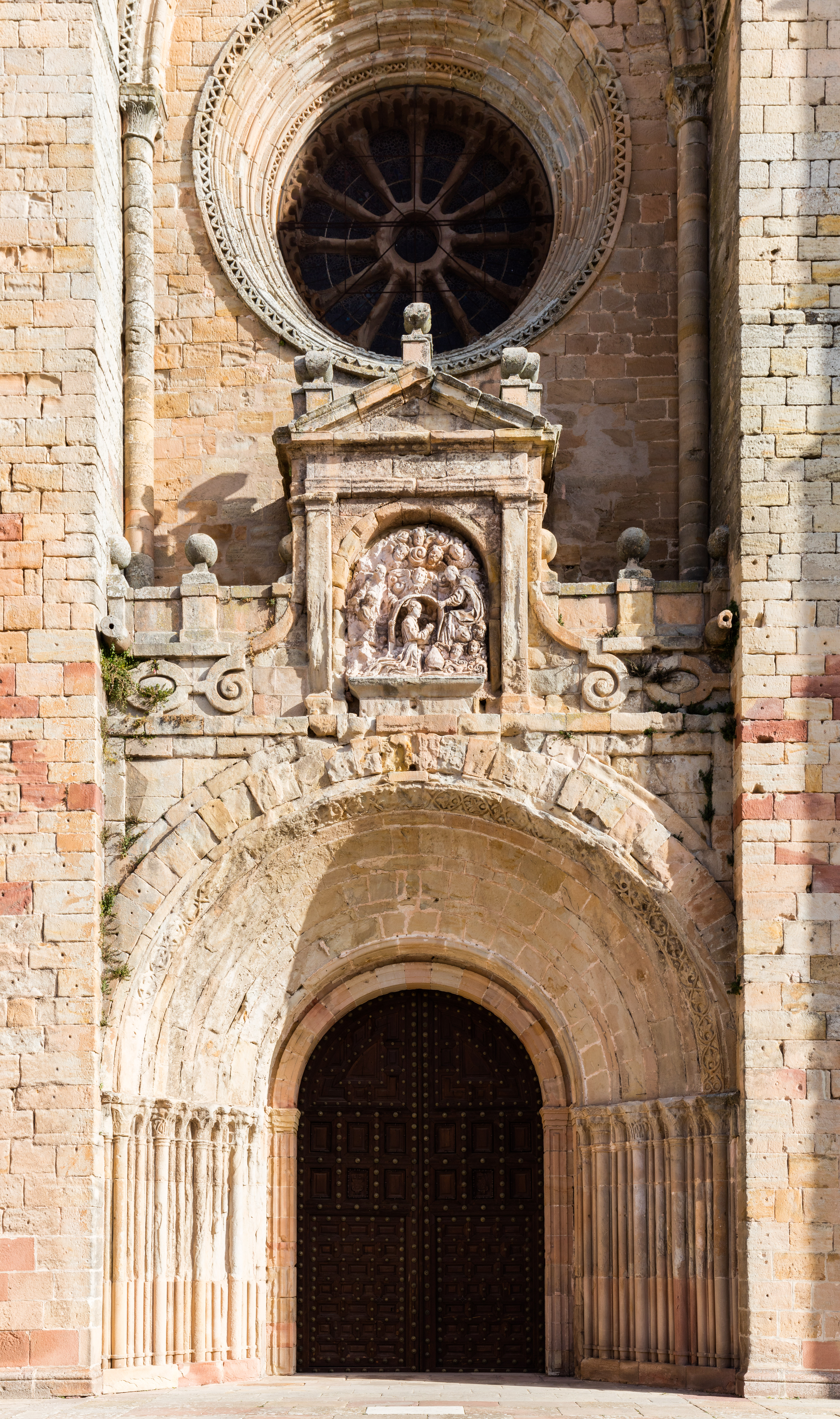
Detail of the main portal.

=== Western facade and atrium ===
The main facade, on the west side, is Romanesque with later Neoclassical and Baroque additions. It has three doors divided by two buttresses.

The atrium, built in 1536, consists of twenty-one limestone columns, topped by chiselled lions, and measures 48 x 24 meters. On the north side of the atrium, the Contaduría del Cabildo has three Plateresque windows. In 1783 the bars and the two forge doors were carved with the shield of the commissioning bishop Francisco Javier Delgado Venegas.

==== Main doors ====
The middle door, called the "Puerta de los Perdones," is built with a semicircular arc and archivolts supported on columns with a capital. Above it is a pediment with a medallion in Baroque bas-relief representing the scene of The imposition of the chasuble on Saint Ildefonsus and a Romanesque rose window of the 13th century to illuminate the central nave.

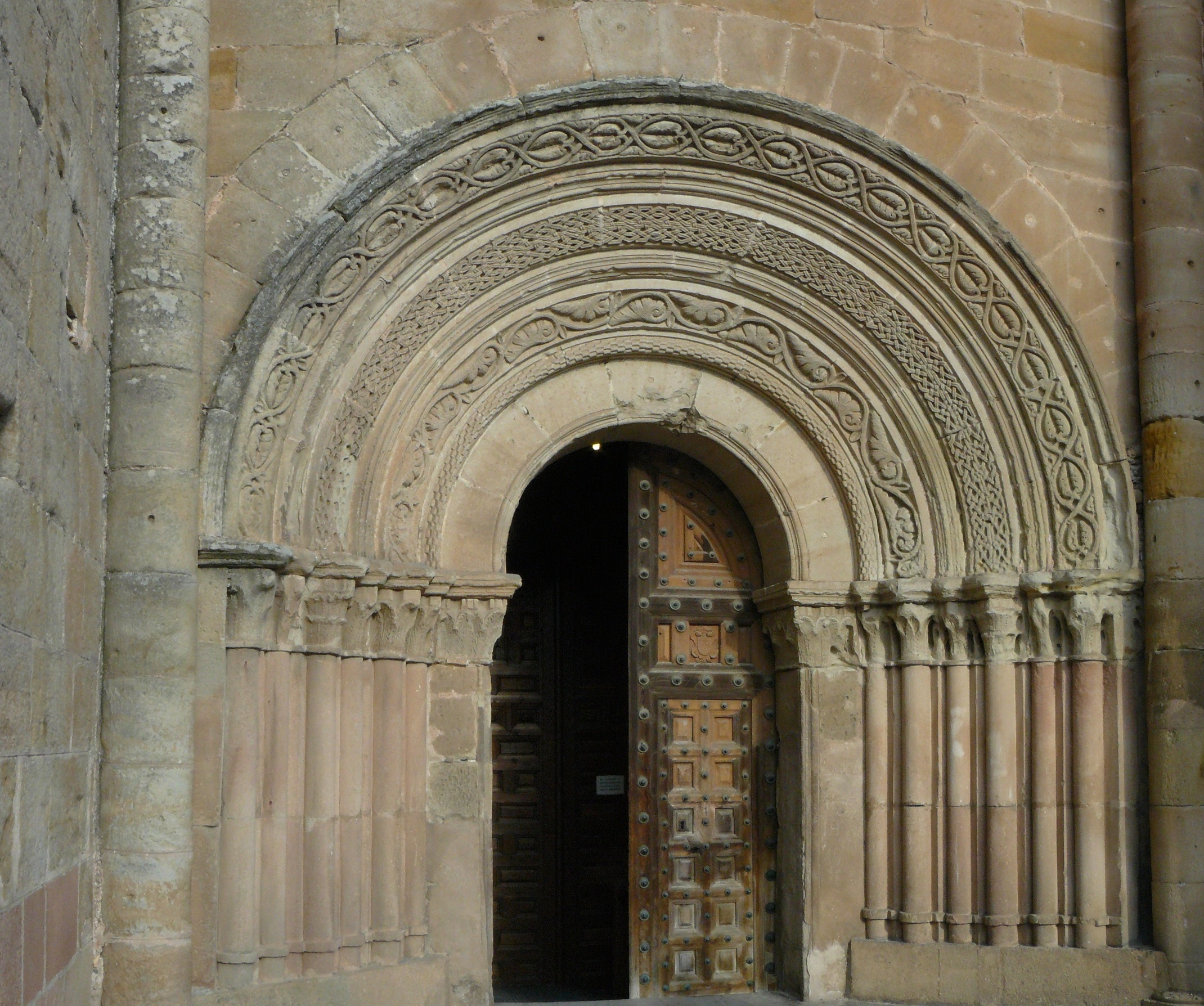
Maindoor of the Gospel side.

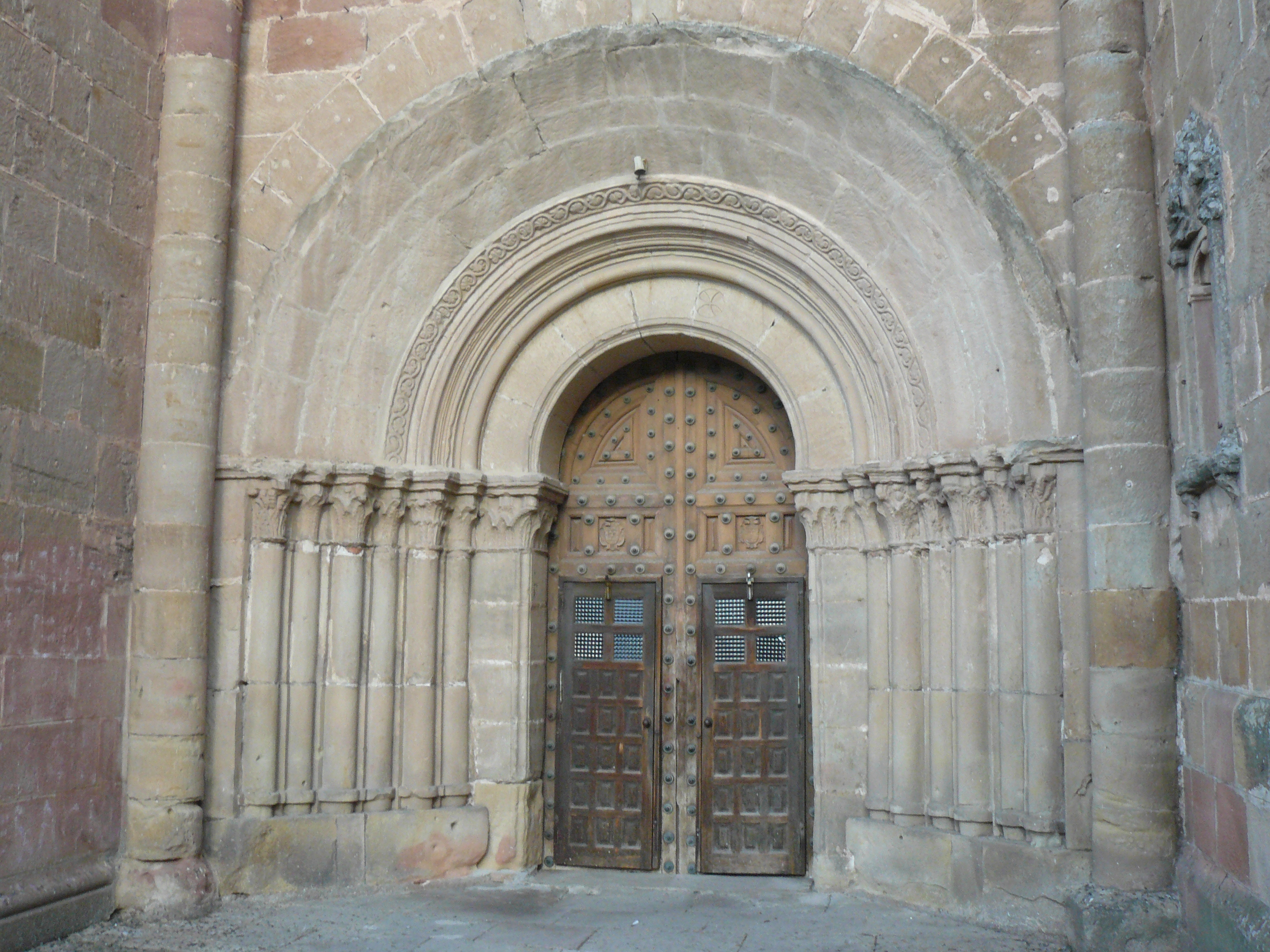
Main door of the Epistle side.

==== Towers of the main facade ====
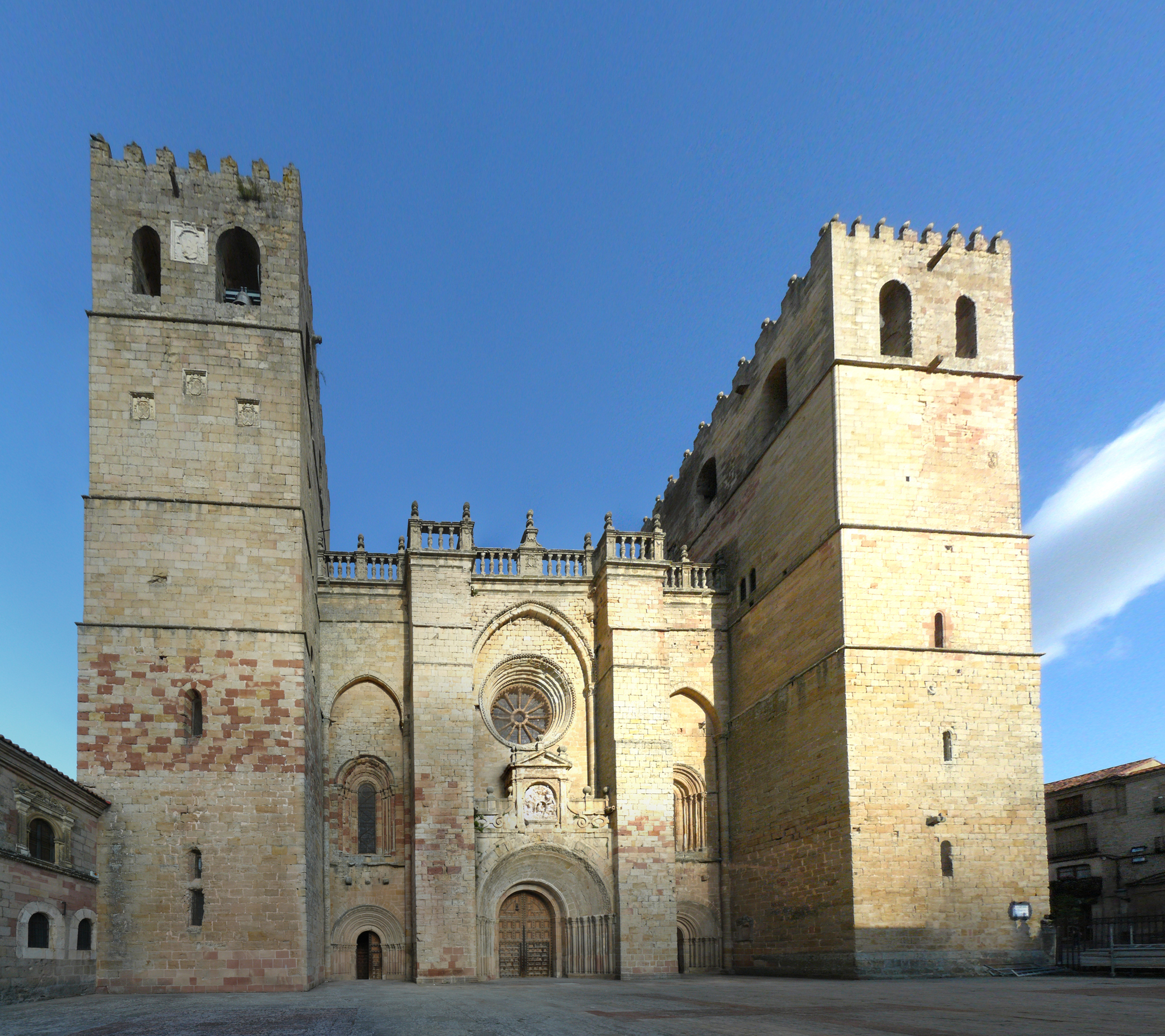
Main facade or western facade

These towers, which were initially isolated, were built with defensive lookouts and later joined the wall. On both sides of the main façade, the two sandstone towers rise, with a square floor plan and three lower rooms with small Romanesque windows -one on each side- and in the fourth section with double windows with round arches. body with merlons and some stone spheres. The tower on the right, called "las Campanas", has a height of 40.5 meters, with an internal staircase of 140 steps, its last body was added in the 14th century, the bishop Pedro Gómez Barroso (1348–1358), who also had stone ashlar covered with the initial work, made in masonry and with the shields of the bishop and the king Peter of Castile placed on the wall of the fourth floor. The tower on the left, called "Don Fadrique", has a height of 41.7 meters and was completed in the 16th century, has the date of 1533 and the inscribed coat of arms of the bishop Fadrique de Portugal.

=== Southern facade or del mercado ===
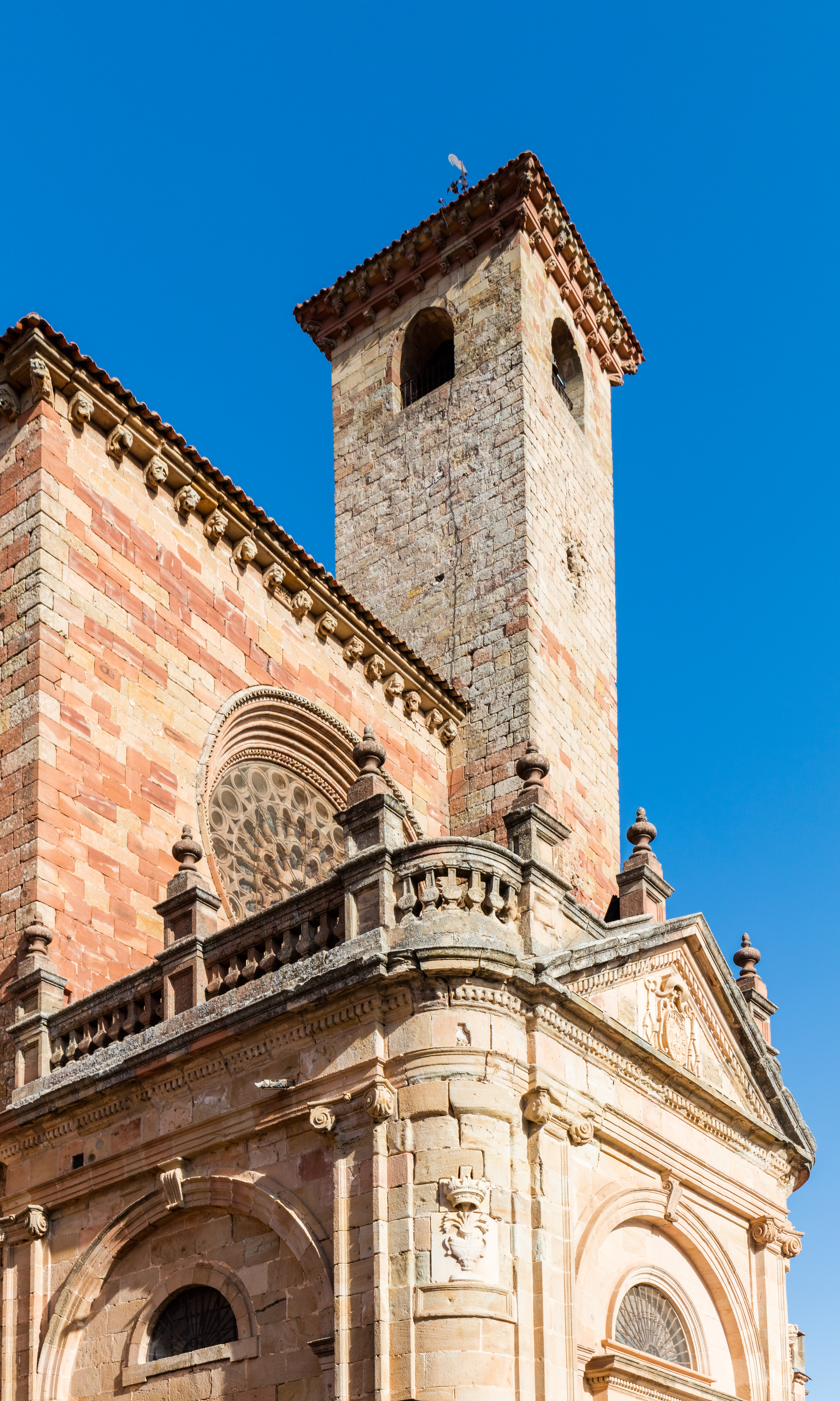
Torre del Gallo.

Turning through the tower of las Campanas is the south facade, corresponding to one end of the transept of the cathedral. In the central nave (higher), you can see the Gothic ogival stained glass, separated by buttresses, with the eaves, resting on brackets, with animal forms, alternating with metopes decorated with plant motifs. The windows of the nave lateral (bottom) show the Romanesque-ogival transition, with eaves and cornice of blind arcades.

==== Puerta del mercado ====
Further east, we find the Puerta del Mercado, formerly "Puerta de La Cadena", which overlooks the Plaza Mayor, Romanesque style, from the 12th century; this door is covered by a closed portico, Neoclassical style, built in 1797 by the architect Bernasconi commissioned by the bishop Juan Díaz de la Guerra. On the portal, a Romanesque rose window of transition, from the 13th century, with a very original tracery design.

==== Torre del Gallo ====
The Gallo tower dates from the early 14th century and was originally a military watchtower to transmit signals that could be seen from the Castle of Sigüenza. It has undergone several restorations over the years. On the central nave, the lantern tower is from the Spanish postwar period.

=== Northern facade ===
It is analogous to the one on the opposite side, with a different rose window; in this facade, the tower is on the sacristy of Wilgefortis, in the north arm of the transept; the height of this tower is that of the central nave, and remains unfinished.

=== Eastern facade ===
On this façade, corresponding to the head of the temple, the presence of the ambulatory that powerfully replaced the five chapels, which were originally Romanesque, stands out. The lantern tower and the tall Gothic windows correspond to the presbytery.

== Interior ==
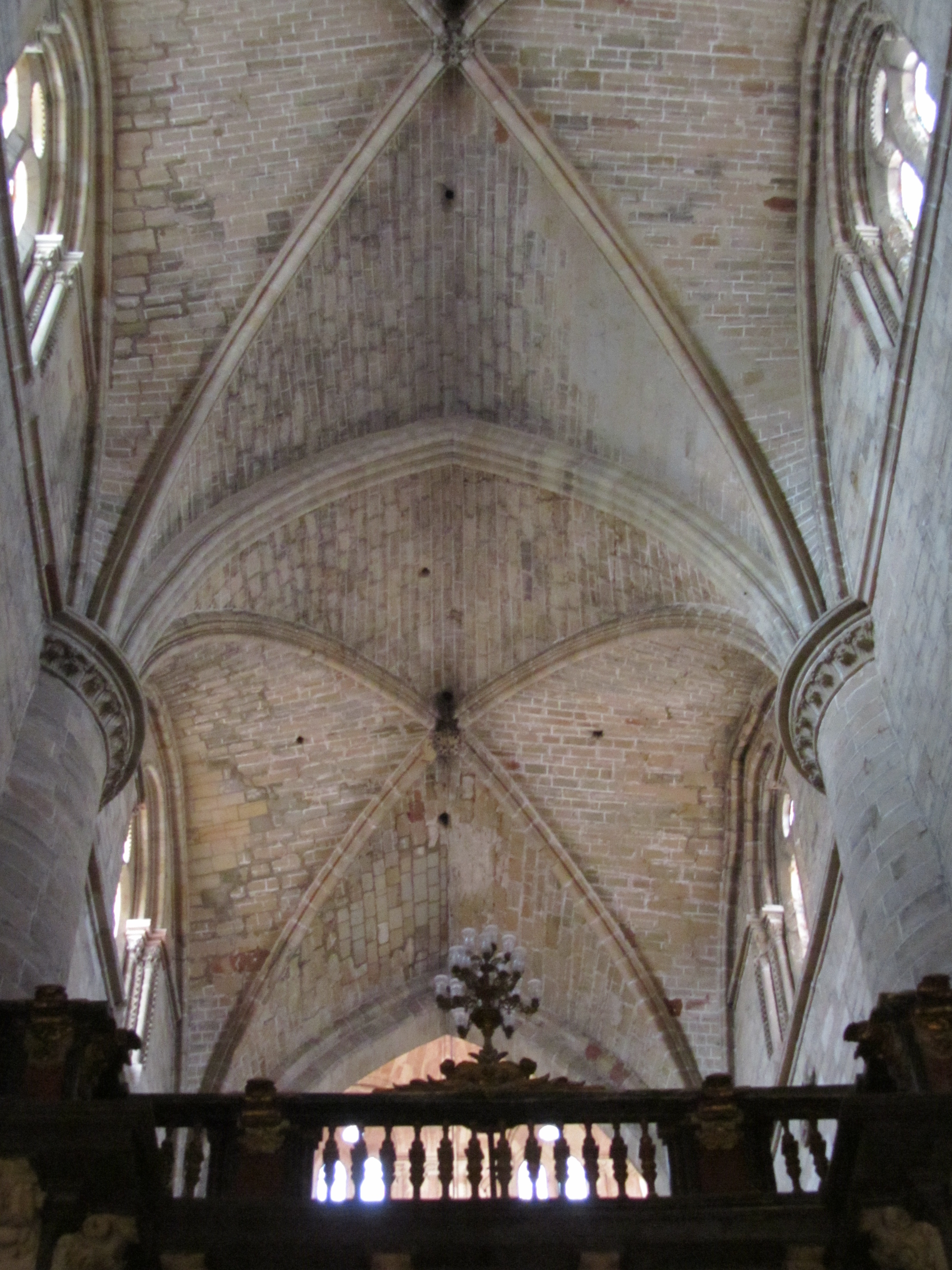
Vault of the central nave.

The cathedral, is currently composed of a Latin cross plant, with three naves, ample transept and head with a large apse, which it contains the main chapel, surrounded by the ambulatory.

It is 80 meters long by 31 meters in width, from one extreme to the other crossing, and 28 m, in length, in the other naves. The central nave, just over 10 meters wide, is 28 m high, the lateral 21 m.

The naves are separated, by enormous pillars, which are each composed of twenty columns attached to capitals of vegetable theme, where the arc-doubleaus and formero arcs are supported. From the capitals, the stony nerves, which form the ogival vaults of rib vault, in general are of simple crossery (with two diagonal nerves), although there are two sexpartite vaults, on the sides of the transept or even octopartite, on the lantern tower. Three of the four pillars that frame the choir are different from the rest of the building, consisting of large cylindrical columns with Romanesque ornamentation in the lower part and Gothic in the upper one.

=== Left nave or that of Gospel ===
The plant of the temple was changing with time, since in the beginning there were no lateral chapels and this is still the case of the Epistle nave that only has an altar and some sepulcher attached to the wall of the choir, on the other hand, on the Gospel nave, chapels were built that reach the adjoining wall of the cloister.

==== Parish of San Pedro ====
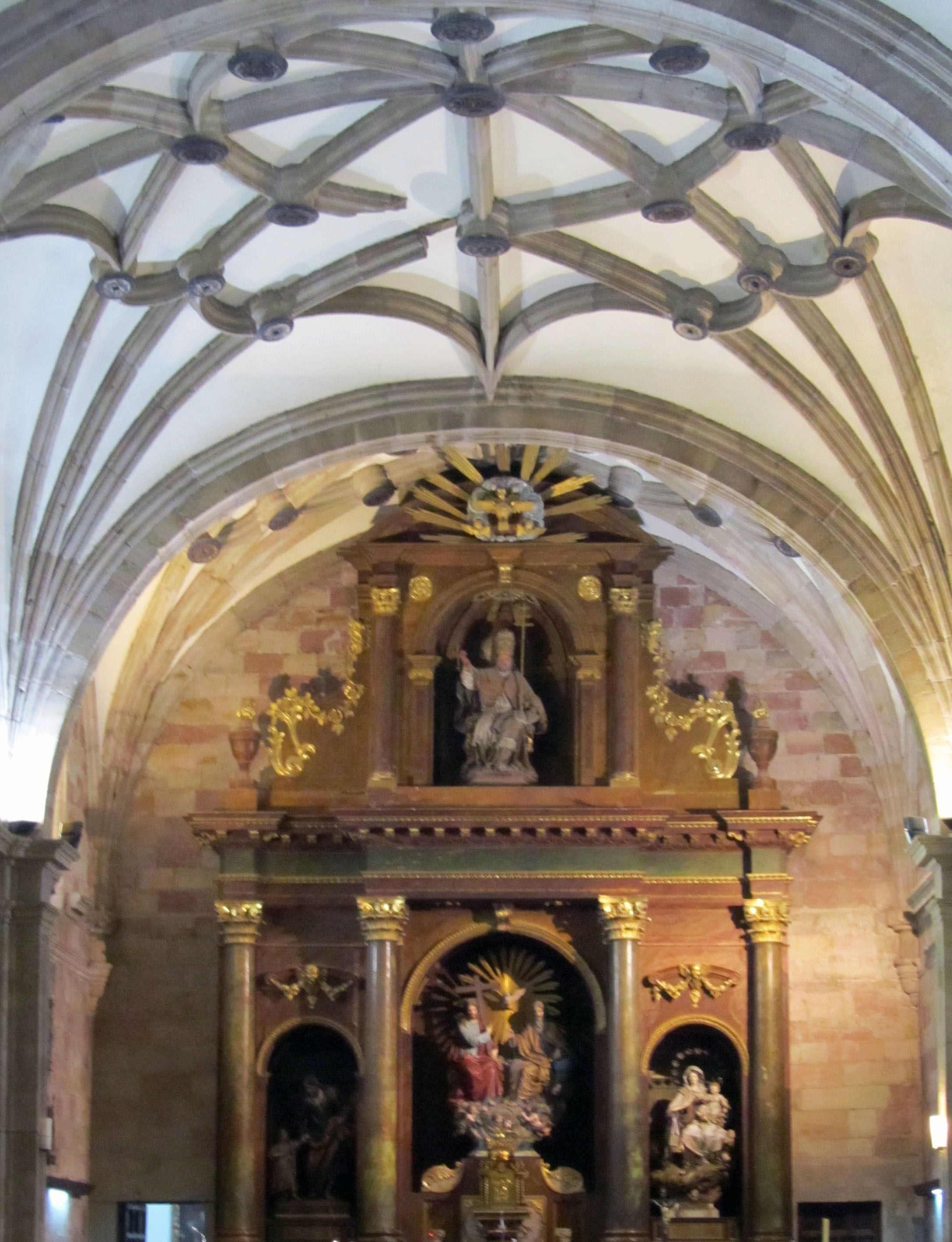
Main altar of San Pedro.

The first chapel on the left side at the foot of the cathedral is known as the parish of San Pedro. It is located, in the place where there had been old monastic dependencies, in the west gallery of the cloister with entrance by the cathedral. It is work of the 15th century, built in 1455 by order of Bishop Fernando Luján (1449–1465) and which was dedicated to Corpus Christi. Its cover is Plateresque, made by Francisco de Baeza, where the shield of the patronage bishop is shown. The grid is Gothic-Plateresque of Juan Francés made in 1533. At the end of this century, the parish of San Pedro was moved to the right of the main chapel and since then it has been known by this name.

It was greatly transformed and enlarged by the bishop Pedro de Godoy in 1675, who added three sections to the vault with the same Gothic style of starry rib vault, in spite of corresponding the work at the end 17th century. The main altar presides over an image of Saint Peter, and under this statue is the Santísima Trinidad work of the sculptor Mariano Bellver y Collazos of 1861, carved in wood and polychrome. It is represented by an iconography inspired by the models of Spanish Baroque: Father God seated, holding in his left hand globe, beside him also seated Jesus Christ carrying a cross and among them the Holy Spirit with Dove shape. The group is located on a cloud in which two angels contemplate the scene surrounded by cherubs. The plant is rectangular, quite elongated, since it occupies the entire western part of the cloister.

On the wall of this chapel is the sepulcher of the first founding bishop Fernando Luján of the 15th century, it is Gothic with scenes on three reliefs of the life of saint Catherine of Alexandria placed on top of the recumbent figure, this sculpture of the bishop. It is located on an arch that gives way to the baptistery and in front of the viewer, it was probably moved from its original place during the works of the 17th century, you can read an inscription that says: "El señor obispo Lujan. Año MCCCCLXV. Último electo por el cabildo".

==== Puerta de San Valero ====
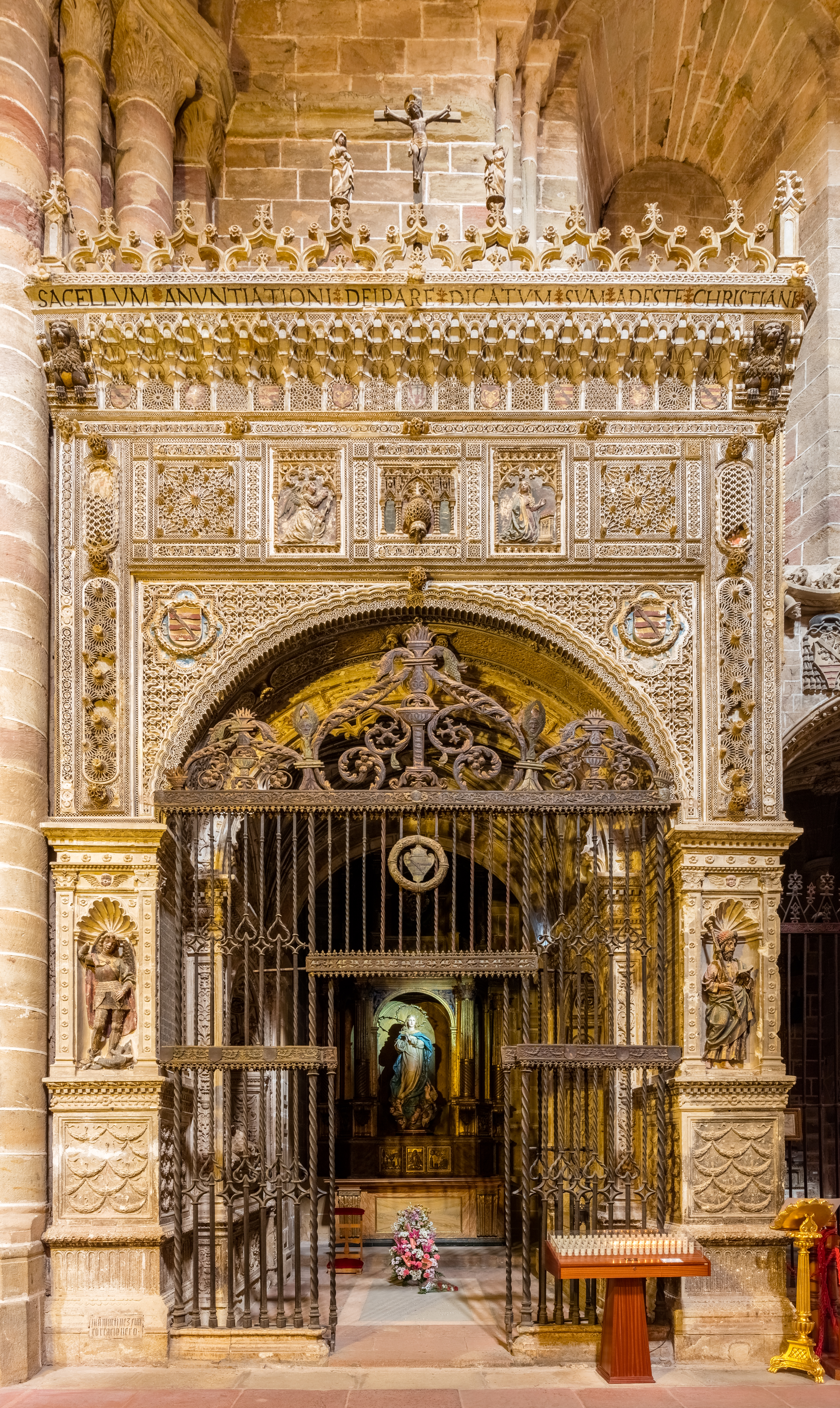
Door of the Chapel of la Anunciación.

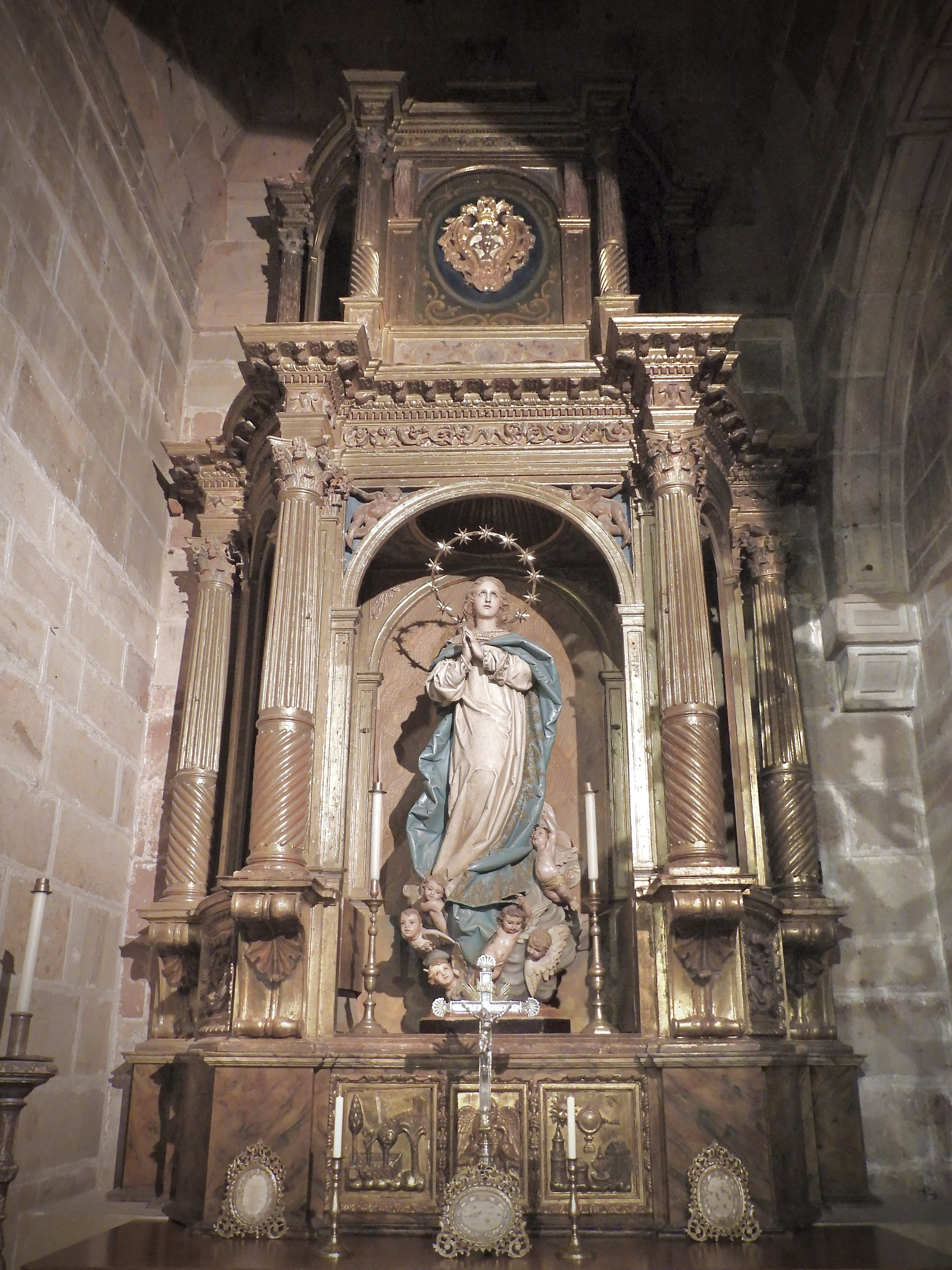
A statue of the crowned virgin mary decorates the Chapel of the Anunciación within the Catedral de Santa María de Sigüenza

It shows a mixture of styles such as Renaissance pilasters, Mudéjar arabesques and Gothic arches, although it is from the beginning of the 16th century, it was built by Domingo Hergueta. This door gives entrance to the cloister, where is the chapel of San Valero, the oldest in the cathedral, with a Romanesque floor and a Gothic iron gate.

==== Chapel of la Anunciación or that of la Purísima ====
Founded in 1515 by the provisor Fernando Montemayor, its magnificent portal is decorated to the "Cisneros style", consists of a low part of Plateresque pilasters where small niches are found that house images of Saint Michael and Saint James, in the arch the ornamentation is composed of geometrical Mudéjar elements of intersecting lines, forming figures of starred laqueus and polygonal between which are shields of the founder of the chapel and in the frieze that also follows it of laqueus is the shield of the cathedral chapter with a scene of The Annunciation under Gothic arches, topped by a cornice, very decorated of Arab type, with a figure of lion, in each end, the crowning of the portal constitutes some arcs in Gothic style with the representation of a Calvary in the central point. The grid is Gothic, by Juan Francés, with twisted bars and Renaissance ornamental themes. The interior of the chapel is covered with a Gothic vault and on its left wall is the sepulcher of Fernando Montemayor, made in Plateresque and polychrome style, there is the sepulcher with the statue lying within a semicircular arcosolium, at the back of which there is also a polychrome relief with the Eternal Father in the center and at its sides two angels in prayer. Opposite this sepulcher is the one of Bishop Eustaquio Nieto y Martín.

–

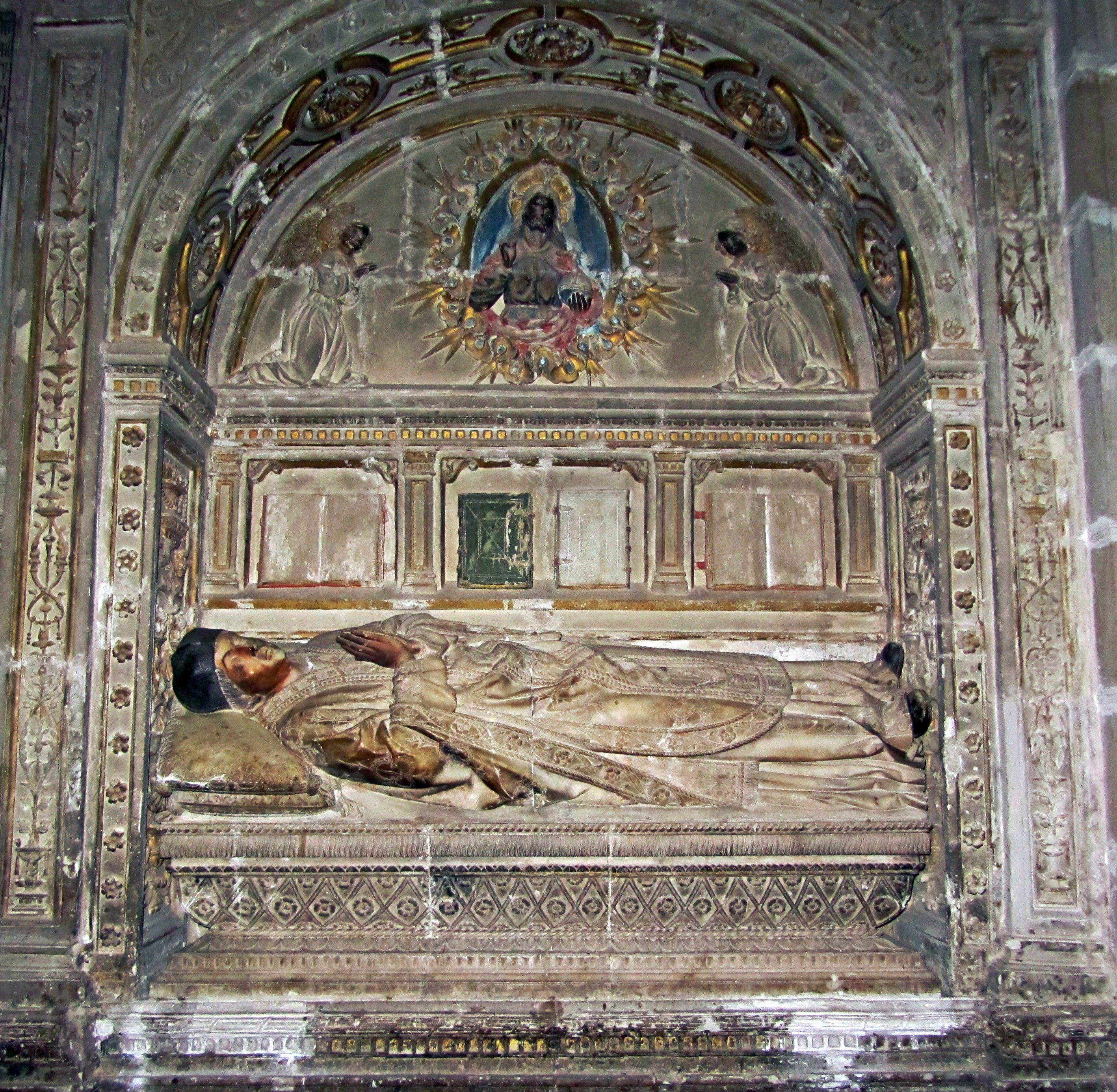
Sepulcher by Fernando de Montemayor.

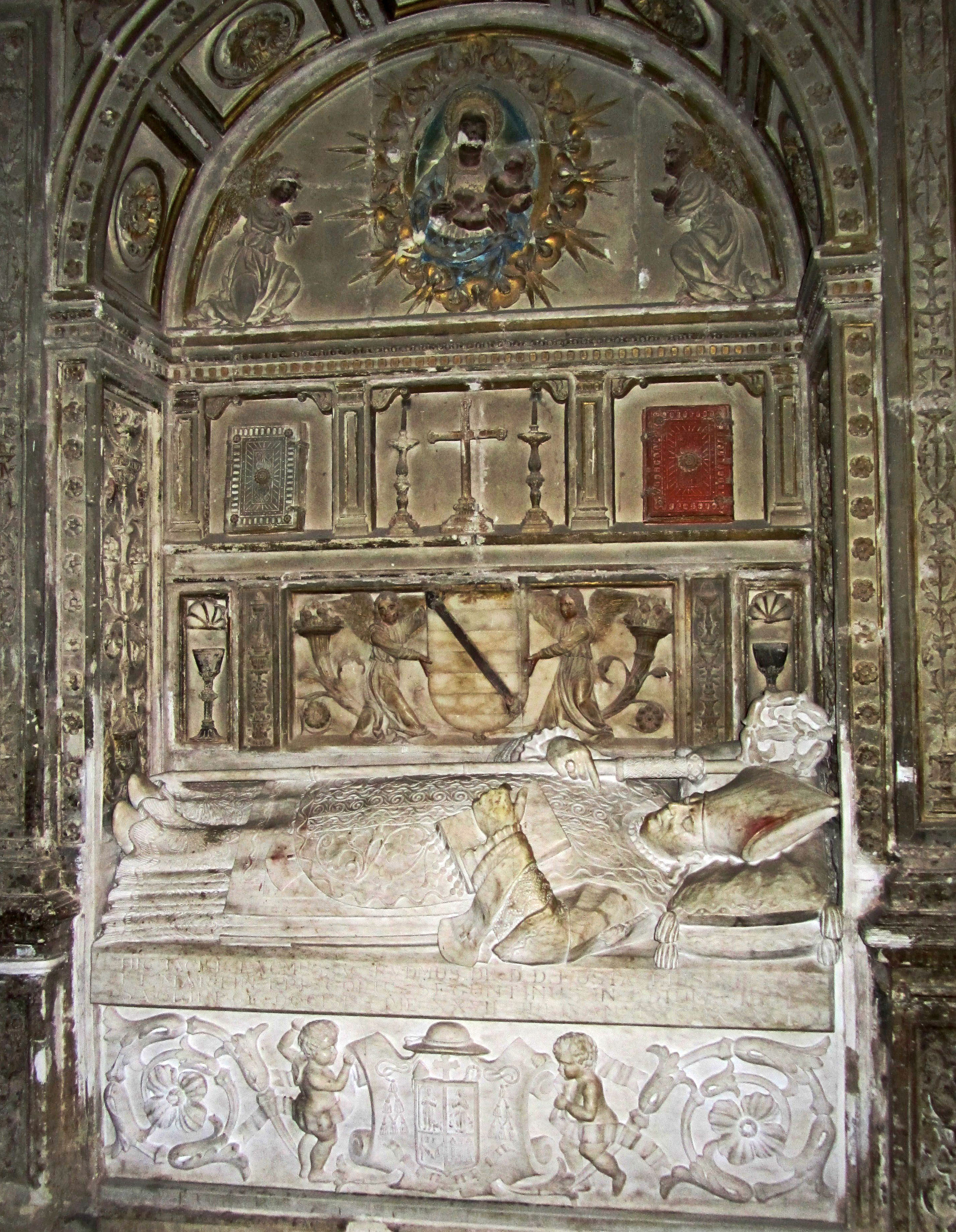
Sepulcher of Eustaquio Nieto y Martín.

==== Chapel of San Marcos ====
The facade is Gothic, the intrados, shows a great Gothic Plateresque decoration. The commissioner of this chapel was Juan Ruiz de Pelegrina who has his burial inside the chapel. There is an altarpiece with six 16th-century painting boards by Francisco del Rincón.

==== Sepulcher of Juan González Monjua and Antón González ====
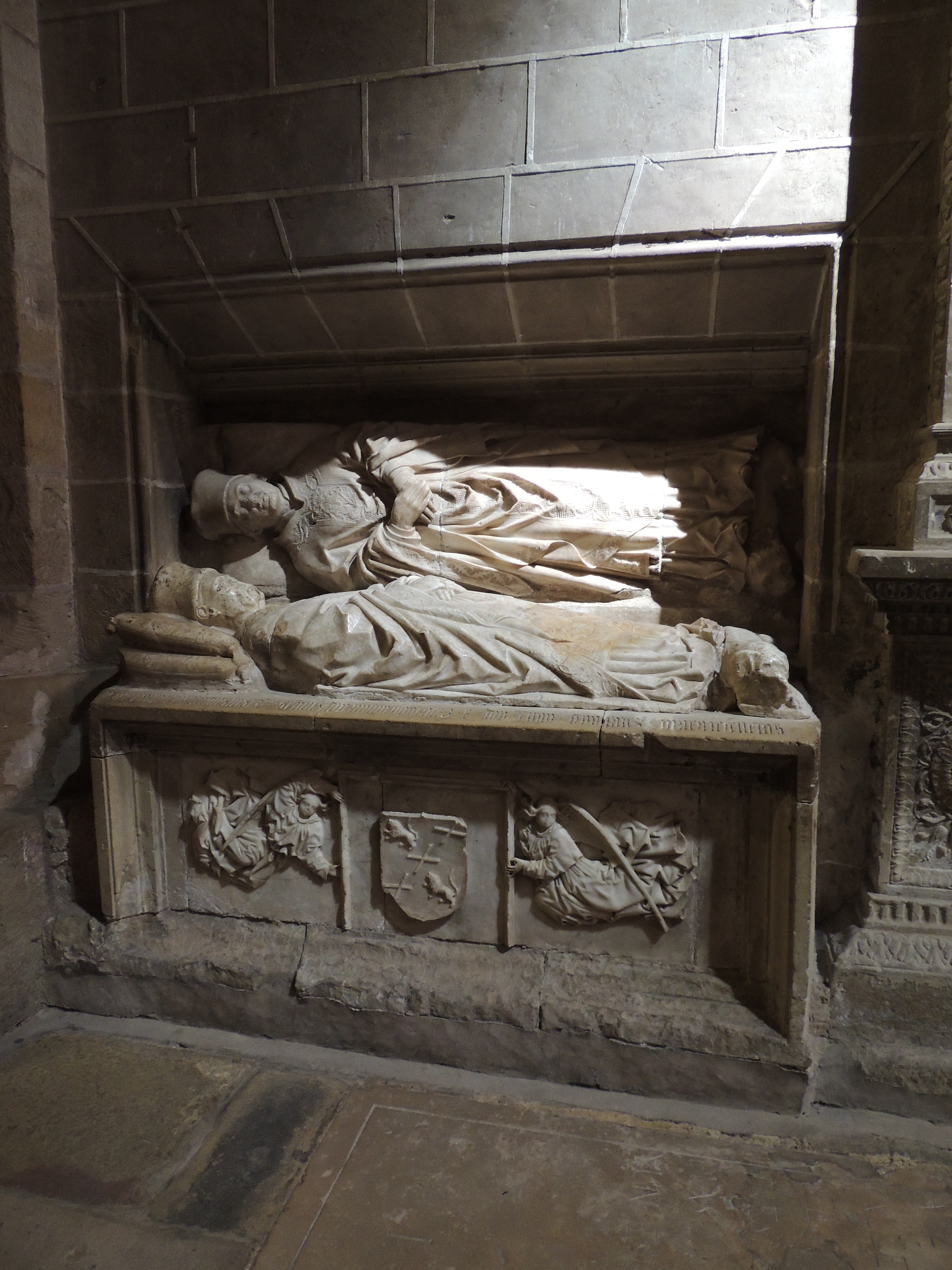
Sepulcher of Juan González Monjua and Antón González

In the sepulcher, which some authors attribute to two brothers, but that, in fact, were uncle and nephew, draws attention the way in which they are placed the figures of both, which represents Juan González Monjua is located on the sarcophagus and forming an angle against the wall, there is that of his nephew Antón González, both have very similar garments and cover their heads with bonnets. On the front of the sepulcher there is a shield engraved in the center, supported by two angels, with the inscription:

AQUÍ ESTAN SEPULTADOS LOS REVER. SRES. D. ANTON GONZALEZ E D. JUAN GONZALEZ MAESTRESCUELAS.

Juan González Monjua occupied the position of ambassador of John II of Castile before Alfonso V of Aragon, in the conflicts that this monarch had with the Kingdom of Castile during the «War of the Infantes of Aragon», while his nephew Antón González founded an institution dedicated to helping the poor, called the "Arca de Misericórdia".

==== Other altars ====
This nave of the Gospel ends with the altars, of Saint John the Baptist formed with a Plateresque arch made by Francisco de Baeza in 1530 and with a Baroque altarpiece of the 18th century. Opposite to the wall of the choir is the altar dedicated to Saint Michael of the 17th century.

=== Crossing ===
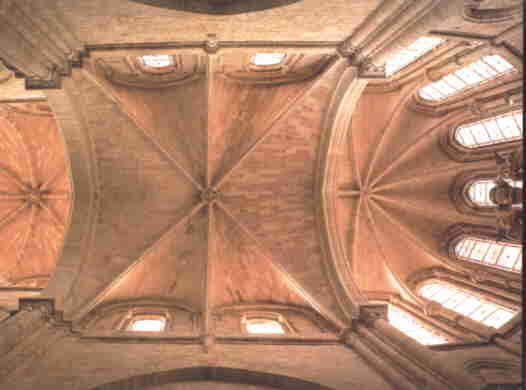
Crossing vaults and presbytery.

It has a length of more than 36 meters and the same height as the central nave. After the Spanish Civil War of 1936, during the restoration works of the cathedral, a lantern tower was built in the center of the crossing. In the Romanesque period the crossing was without any type of altars or altarpieces, at the beginning of the 16th century and in Plateresque style the ones of Wilgefortis and Fadrique de Portugal were placed on the north side and on the south side it has the door that gives the main square of the city with a Romanesque rose window, the Chapel of the Doncel and the altar of Our Lady of the Milk. It is covered with ribbed vaults, the dome of the lantern tower is square with eight partitions and eight ogival windows that give way to natural light, the sides of the crossing, are covered by sixpartite vaults.

==== Sacristía Moderna or that of Wilgefortis ====
It is located in the northern part of the transept. It has a Plateresque portal by Francisco de Baeza, flat pilasters, on pedestals, with jambs and lintel with carved plant ornaments. It has a large frieze and pediment, with the arms of the bishop Fadrique de Portugal.

==== Puerta del Pórfido and Puerta del Jaspe ====
Next to the front portal is this one of the beginning of the 16th century, its decoration is of Plateresque style, with smooth pilasters and a series of friezes. It gives way to the cloister, where in that part is the Puerta del Jaspe of 1507, in yellow and red marble; it is the oldest Renaissance part of the cathedral.

==== Reredos ====
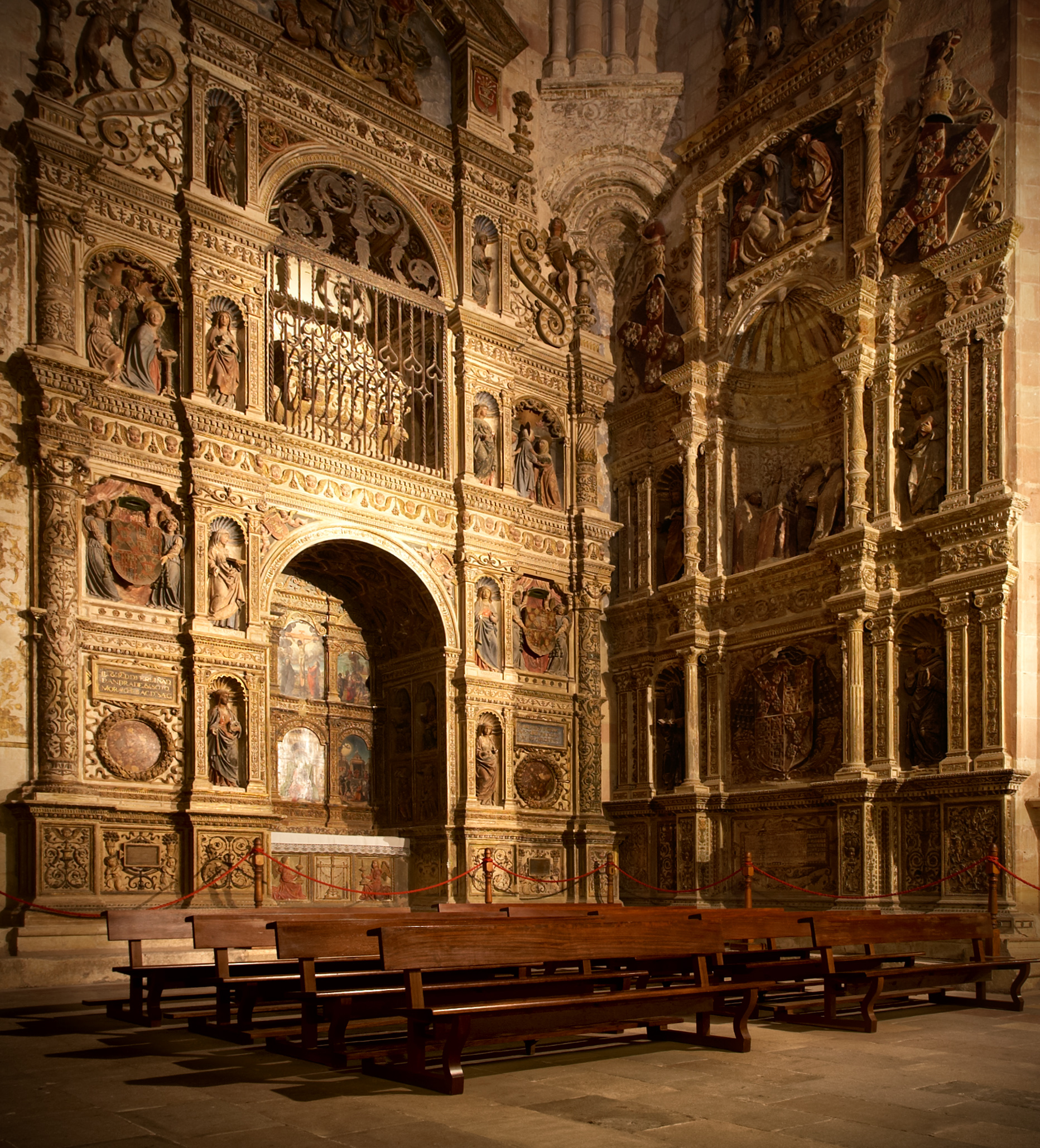
Plateresque reredos of Wilgefortis and Fadrique de Portugal.

It was normal for the cathedrals of the Middle Ages to be placed under the protection of the relics of a martyr, and for that purpose the bishop Bernard of Agen brought to Sigüenza those of the martyr Wilgefortis, from the 4th century, from Aquitaine.

The reredos is located at the northern end of the transept and was commissioned by the bishop Fadrique de Portugal. Executed as a large mausoleum in limestone, it is dedicated to Wilgefortis. It shows the perfect conjunction between architecture, sculpture and painting which is typical of Renaissance-Plateresque art. Architecturally takes the form of a triumphal arch of three bodies, traced by Alonso de Covarrubias in 1518 and realized by Francisco de Baeza, with a vault of semicircular arch with coffers and on both sides niches with images of the evangelists and the fathers of the Church, as well as scenes of the virgin Mary and saints, all between columns on pedestals. In the middle part of the great reredos there is a silver urn with the relics of the saint, protected by an iron gate of Juan Francés. In the attic there is a high relief of the Virgin Mary surrounded by angels.

In the lower part, behind the reredos and inside the semicircular arch, is where the altarpiece itself is, formed by two bodies and three streets, the central one wider and higher than the lateral ones, with six paintings on a table of Juan Soreda made between 1525 and 1528. The central table of the upper body represents the Deesis and the five remaining scenes from the life of the martyr: Wilgefortis and her sisters in front of Catelio; Wilgefortis and her sisters deliberate about their fate; Wilgefortis comforts one of her sisters; Decapitation of Wilgefortis and Wilgefortis enthroned, the latter in the central street of the lower body. The image of Wilgefortis enthroned is inspired by the engraving of Marcantonio Raimondi of Our Lady of the Cloud by Raphael. The martyr is sitting with a book in her hand and the palm of martyrdom in the other. In the frieze painted in the building of Classical architecture that shelters the throne of the saint, four works of Hercules are represented, with a meaning symbolic symbolism in relation to the virtues of the martyr, which he preferred death rather than yield to earthly pleasures, just as Hercules had to fight with beasts -as allegories of vices- to achieve immortality. It was the moralizing message of Renaissance to present the exemplary life of Wilgefortis and her sisters, as Santiago Sebastián says:

... for to express that she was as virtuous and strong as Hercules himself.

— Pórtico de Arte y Humanismo, Santiago Sebastián (1981) p.199

==== Mausoleum of Fadrique de Portugal ====
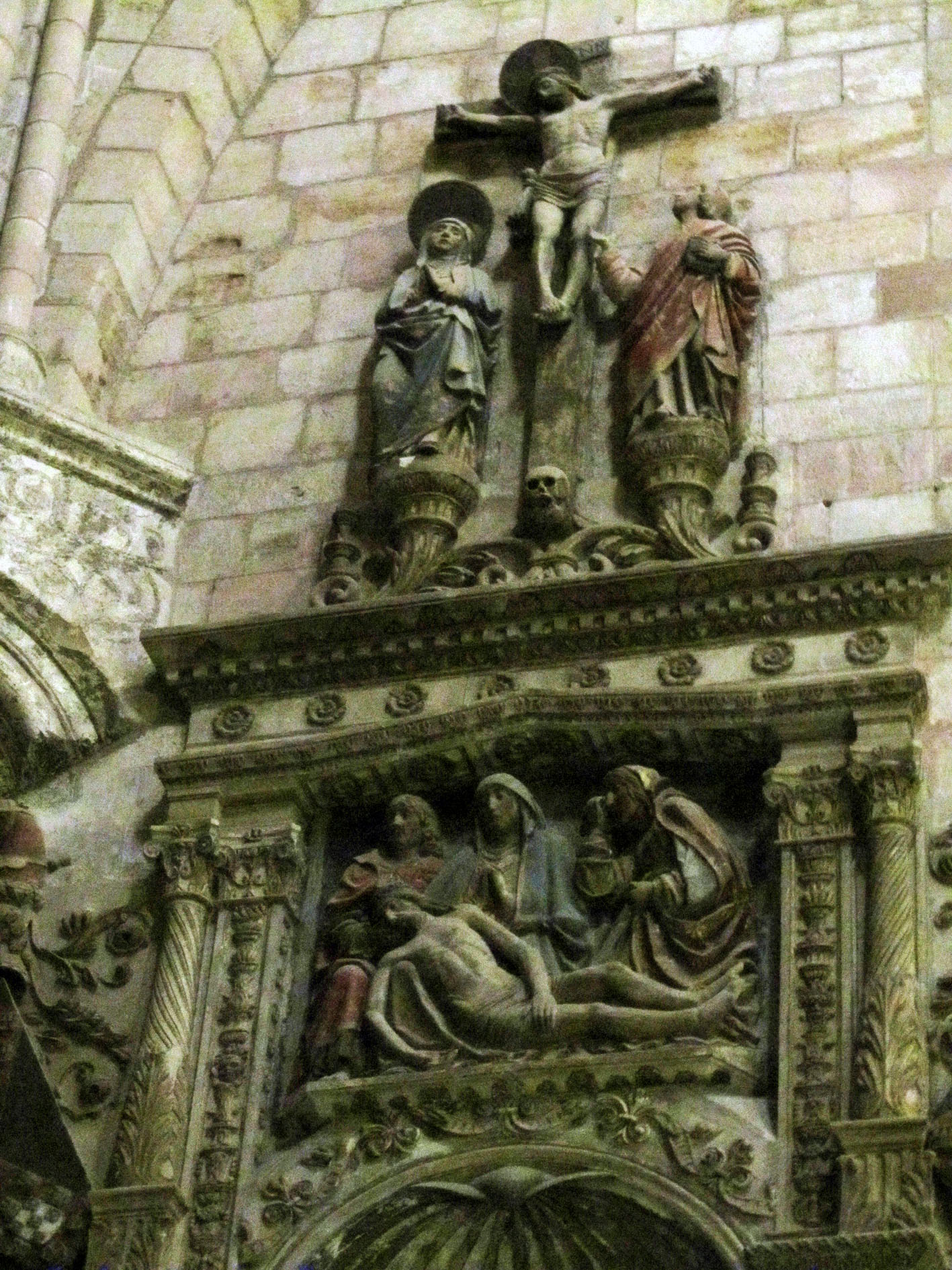
Detail of the mausoleum of Fadrique de Portugal.

The mausoleum of Fadrique de Portugal is Plateresque style and made by mandate of the aforementioned bishop under the design of Alonso de Covarrubias while the reredos of Wilgefortis was built, with the corner on the north part of the cathedral crossing, therefore it was made about 1520. The execution of the reredos was carried out by Francisco de Baeza and his collaborators Sebastián de Almonacid and Juan de Talavera, finalizing the project for the year 1539, date of the death of the bishop in Barcelona, from where he was transferred and buried in this place. The reredos consists of three bodies plus bench and attic with three streets. On the bench there is a card that alludes to the bishop and various adornments of grotesques and vegetal motifs, in the first body in the central part there is a large shield with the bishop's arms and two niches on both sides with the images of St. Andrew and St. Francis, the second body inside a niche is the image of Bishop Fadrique kneeling in the company of two clerics, with two other images on the side streets also inside niches of St. Peter and St. Paul, on this body there is a relief of a Pieta and on both sides the shields of the patron and to finish in the attic a polychrome Calvary.

==== Chapel of the Doncel ====
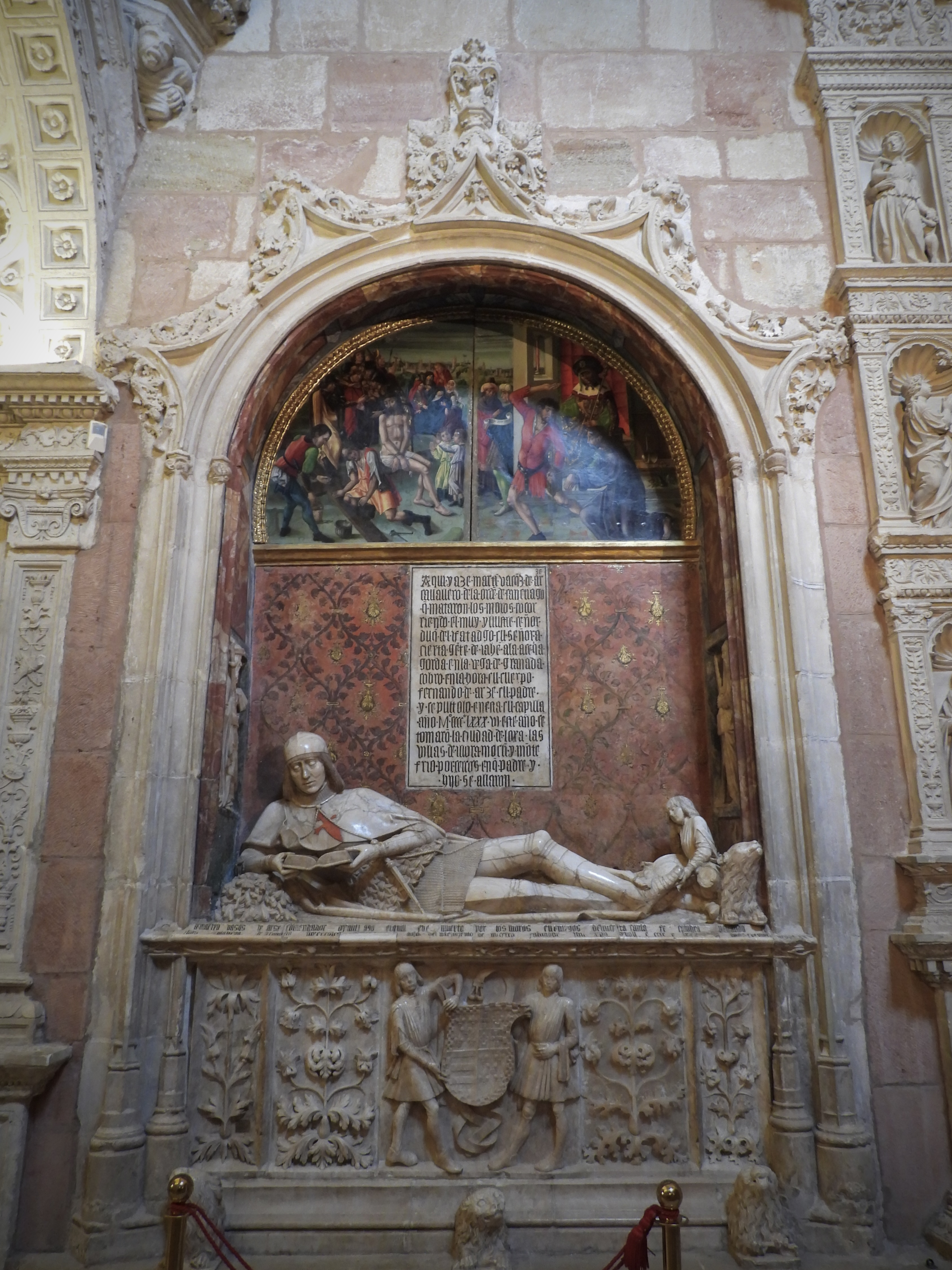
The sepulcher of El Doncel de Sigüenza.

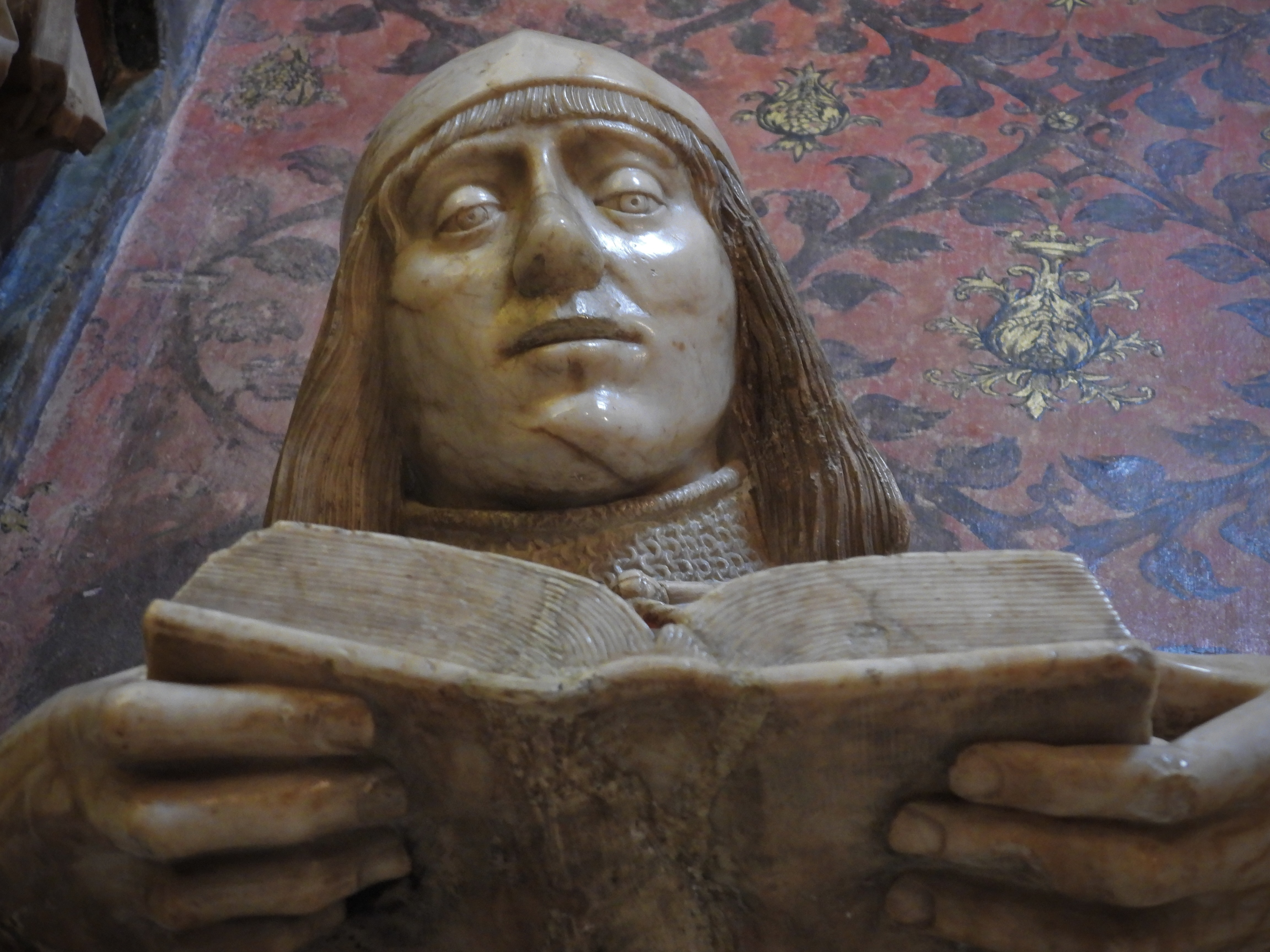
A close-up of the head of the sepulcher of El Doncel de Sigüenza.

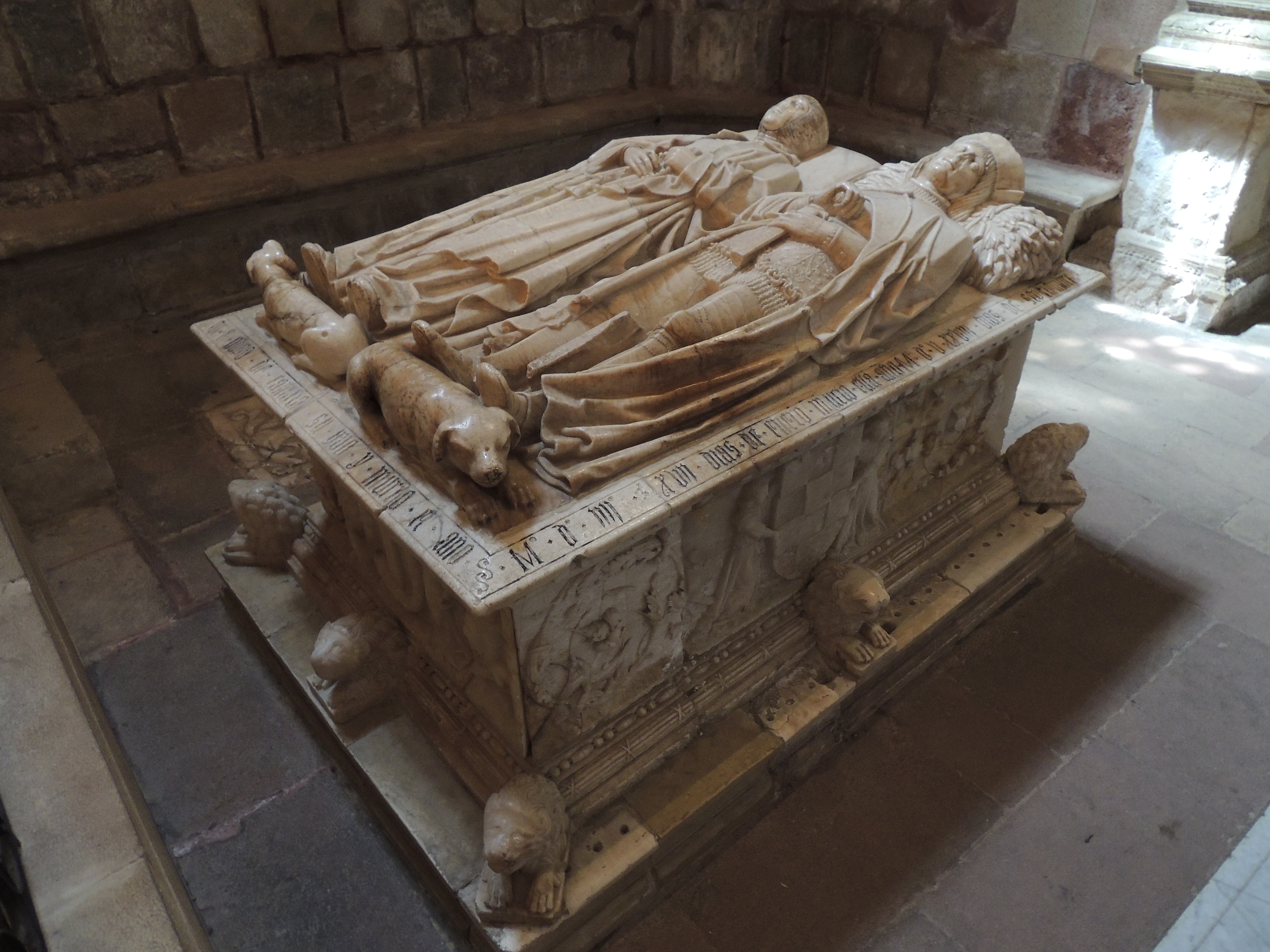
Sepulcher of Fernando de Arce and Catalina de Sosa

The masterpiece of this chapel and perhaps of the cathedral, is the burial of Martín Vázquez de Arce, the doncel de Sigüenza, "one of the masterpieces of funerary sculpture".

This chapel is on the south side of transept, also called "Chapel of Saint John and Saint Catherine" and formerly part of one of the apse chapels of the Romanesque cathedral, dedicated to saint Thomas of Canterbury. The entrance to the chapel is made through an iron gate executed by Juan Francés between 1526 and 1532, the portal is Plateresque style and was built by Francisco de Baeza. In the interior there are several burials, standing out in the center of the pantheon the mausoleum, of Renaissance style, of the parents of the doncel, Fernando de Arce and Catalina de Sosa, supported by lions and with recumbent statues of both, the head of her on a cushion, his on laurels, indicating that he died fighting. It also highlights, on the wall, the Plateresque sepulcher of Fernando Vázquez de Arce, bishop of Canary Islands, counselor of Ferdinand II of Aragon and brother of the doncel, which acquired the chapel to the la Cerda family-former owners from the 14th century, in order to serve as a funeral chapel for him and his family, signing the decree by which they acquired the right to burial on January 9, 1487.

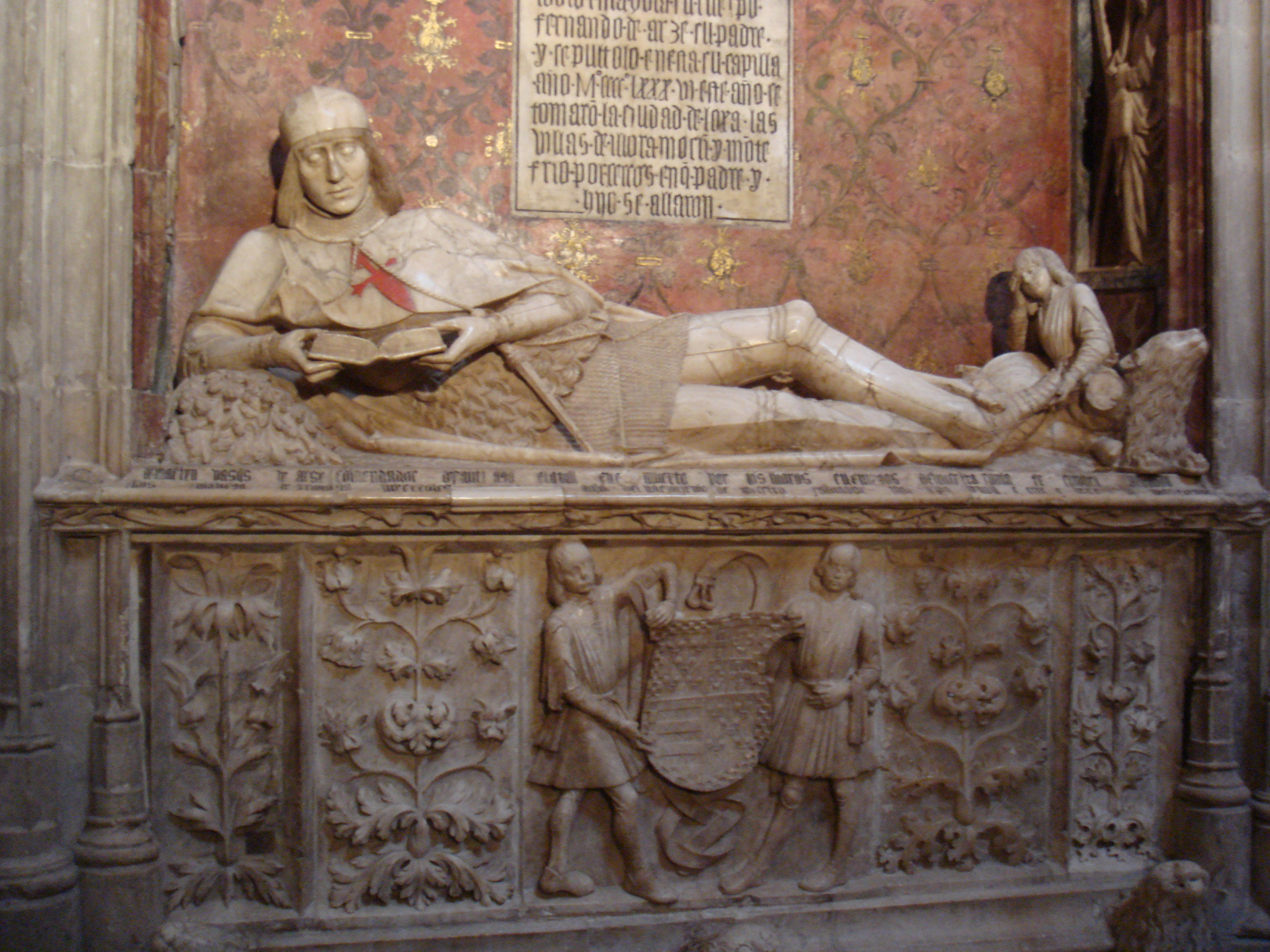
Sepulcher of the Doncel

The sepulcher placed on three lions is under a niche in semicircular arch, with the statue of the doncel in alabaster, is dressed in armor and with the cross of Saint James in the chest, the fist of a sword and a small dagger can be seen in the waist, the head is covered with a bonnet that fits completely, but what stands out most is that it is not a recumbent figure, asleep, but that he is reclining, with one leg over the other and supports the half-built arm, in the attitude of reading a book that he holds open in his hands, in the front of the tomb two pages hold the coat of arms and it is ornamented with delicate carvings in candilieri. All the work is polychrome. The date of realization of this funerary set is between 1486, the year of the death of the doncel, and 1504, in which it is quoted in his father's testament as already made in the chapel of the cathedral.

The lower part of the niche, contains the following inscription:

Here lies Martín Vasques de Arce – Knight of the Order of Santiago – killed by the Moors in relief – the very illustrious Lord Duke of Infantado his lord – to certain people from Jaén to the Acequia – Gorda in the fertile plain of Granada – charged in the hour his body Fernando de Arce his father – and buried in this his chapel – year MCCCCLXXXVI. This year they took the city of Lora. – The villages of Illora, Moclin and Monte frío – by fences in which father and son were found.

— Anonymous

==== Reredos of Saint John and Saint Catherine ====
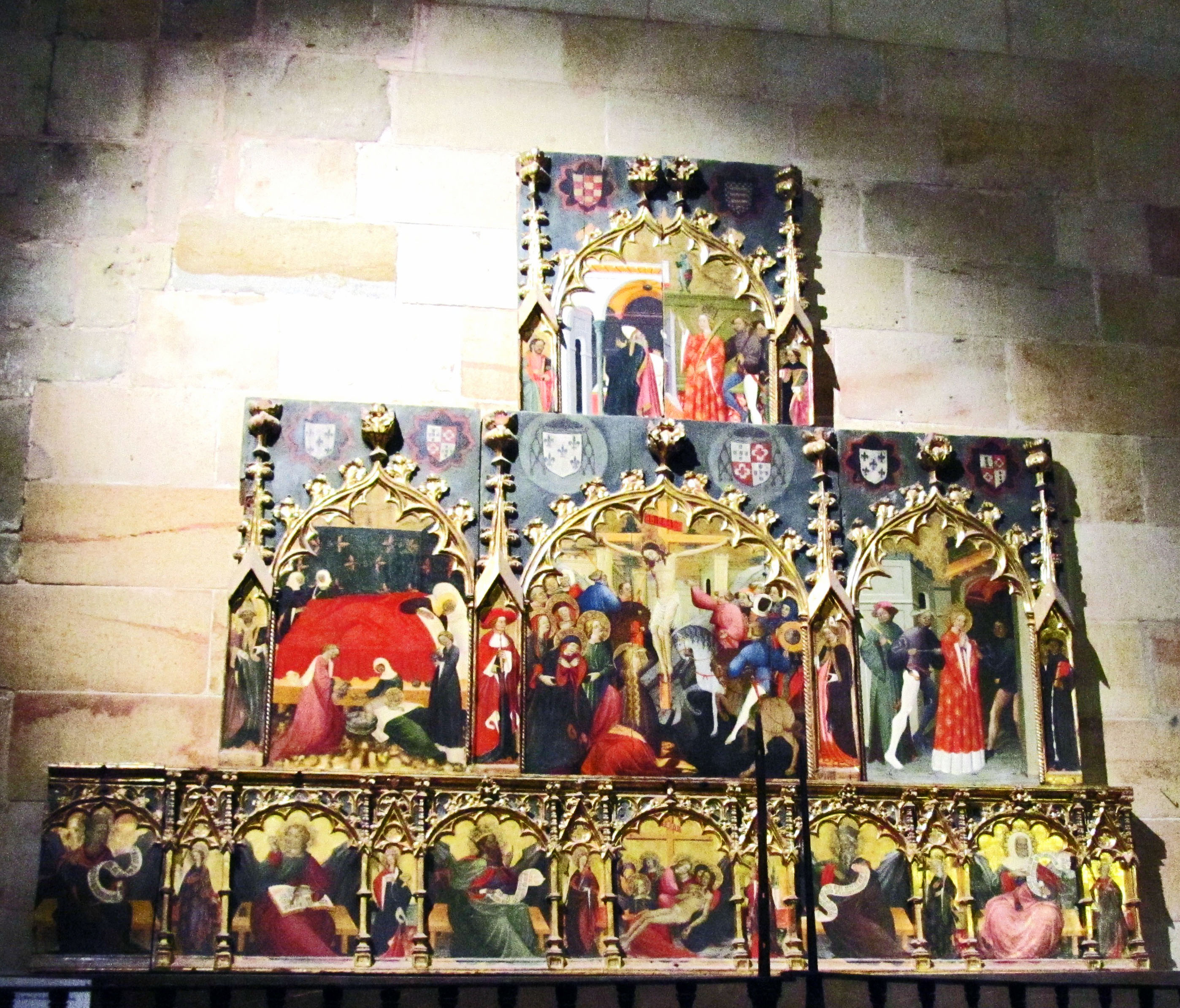
Gothic reredos of Saint John and Saint Catherine.

This reredos is found on the crossing, next to the Chapel of the Doncel and comes from the sacristy of the aforementioned chapel. It consists of several of the tables made around 1440, commissioned by the la Cerda family. The tables are painted in an Italianate Gothic style and in the central table the Crucifixion is represented while in the others they are scenes of the life of Saint John and Saint Catherine, the predella is also preserved where they observe various painted images of the prophets. From this same reredos there are several tables kept in the Museo del Prado.

==== Reredos of Our Lady of Milk ====
This reredos is attached, to the front pillar of the Epistle side of the choir, the image is of alabaster, of 1514, work of Miguel de Aleas; the reredos, made in Plateresque style, is by Francisco de Baeza, the columns, which frames the avenerate half-dome, are also of the same material, ending with a frieze and a pediment, with the coat of arms of the Cathedral chapter.

=== Ambulatory ===
The ambulatory was built at the end of the 16th century, abandoning the previous typology with the demolition of the old Romanesque apse with five chapels and replacing it with a deambulatory that revolved around the greater apse.

This ambulatory has some half-barrel vaults, with transverse circular arches of the nave, one of the chapels that existed in the 12th century, that of Saint John the Baptist and whose entrance was walled off by the mausoleum of Bishop Fadrique. it became the minor sacristy or that of Mercenary, having access to it by the ambulatory on the Gospel side, has a Baroque façade of 1688. Next is the sepulcher, of white marble, of the bishop Bernard of Agen under an arcosolium and realized in 1449 by Martín de Lande and that was placed in this place in 1598, next to it is the greater sacristy or "chapel of the heads" and the chapel of the Holy Spirit. The ambulatory was built and placed in it five altars as the work progressed in its construction: that of Saint Ildephonsus and that of Saint Philip Neri in 1565, that of Our Lady of the Rosary in 1639, that of San Roque in 1662 and the one of saint Pedro de Arbués the 1667. By this side there is a door of access to the chapel and sacristy of the Christ of the Mercy. The masters of the ambulatory work during these years were the so-called "five Juanes", for matching their first name; Juan Vélez, Sánchez del Pozo, Gutiérrez de Buega, de Ballesteros and who finished it Juan Ramos.

==== Major sacristy or that of the Heads ====
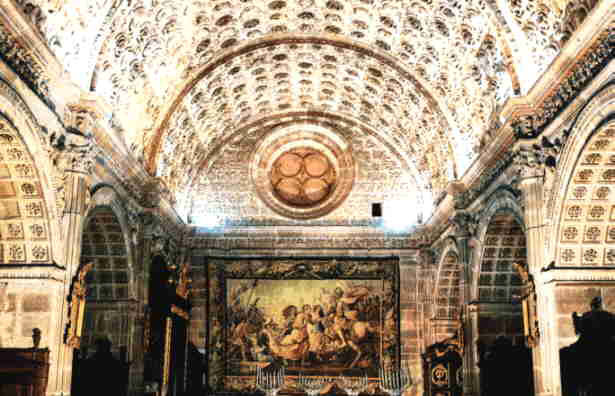
Vault of the Heads.

Located in the northern part of the ambulatory, its access is through a portal stone of Plateresque style made in 1573 by the master builder of the cathedral Juan Sánchez del Pozo, presents inside from several vaulted niches images of apostles and doors are made of walnut wood carved by Martín de Vandoma with fourteen reliefs of saint martyrs. In 1532, Alonso de Covarrubias made the design, drawing the plans until in 1534 he was appointed master builder of the Cathedral of Toledo so he left Sigüenza, building the sacristy continued under the architect Nicolás de Durango until his death in 1554. It was then when the chapter of the cathedral hired for its substitution to Martín de Vandoma, four years later the works stopped when being dismissed Vandoma in 1559, without the reason is known. Faced with various complaints from Vandoma, the town council agreed to admit him, and that the work of the sacristy continued, according to a capitular act of March 18, 1560, from then on he continued for eighteen more years working on various works of the cathedral until his death in 1578.

The interior of the chapel has a rectangular floor plan with semicircular arches attached to its walls, where the sacristy's own furniture is placed, from these arches there is a cornice where the half-barrel vault begins, completely covered with coffers, in which are carved more than 300 heads representing all kinds of characters from the time from bishops to monks, from warriors to kings, from peasants to nobles. In the angles of the quadrants where the reliefs of the heads are there are smaller ones of cherubs and other quadrants, alternating with the previous ones, with roses. The furniture made of walnut wood was also made by Martín de Vandoma with Plateresque ornaments.

==== Chapel of the Holy Spirit ====
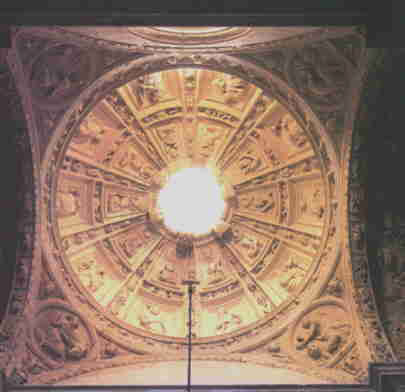
Vault of the Chapel of the Holy Spirit.

From the sacristy of the Heads, one enters the chapel of Plateresque invoice, by means of a very ornamented portal and a Plateresque grate of wrought iron, work of Hernando de Arenas, of 1561, according to a design by Esteban Jamete and financed by Bishop Fernando Niño de Guevara (1546–1552) around 1561. The bishop's shield is on it and is one of the best iron gates in the cathedral. In the contract of the grid it is stipulated that Hernando de Arenas would charge a thousand ducats and that it would be carried out in Cuenca, but the gold would be made in Sigüenza by Pedro de Villanueva.

The chapel was designed by Esteban Jamete with a square plan and Plateresque decoration. It is covered with a hemispherical dome on pendentives, which support a majestic roof lantern with the image of the Eternal Father, work of Martín de Vandoma. It shows on its walls an Annunciation, where the Virgin and the Archangel are on opposite walls. On the altar, there are busts of saints that contain relics and, among others, a cypress carving of Bishop San Martín de Hinojosa.

==== Chapel of the Christ of Mercy ====
In the ambulatory but already on the Epistle side is this chapel that was an old tabernacle or sacristy, with a Plateresque portal, a semicircular arch and a Renaissance triangular pediment, very ornate, built in 1498 by Miguel de Aleas and Fernando de Quejigas. The iron gate was carved by Domingo Zialceta in the year 1649. Inside, it has a late Gothic vault of the 15th century, a Baroque reredos of the 17th century and a crucifix, carved in wood, called Christ of Mercy dating from the 16th century, this chapel also has its corresponding sacristy.

=== Central nave ===
The initial part of the chancel, is square and covered with a sexpartite vault, leaves room for four ogee-shaped windows, on the facades north and south.

==== Gospel pulpit ====
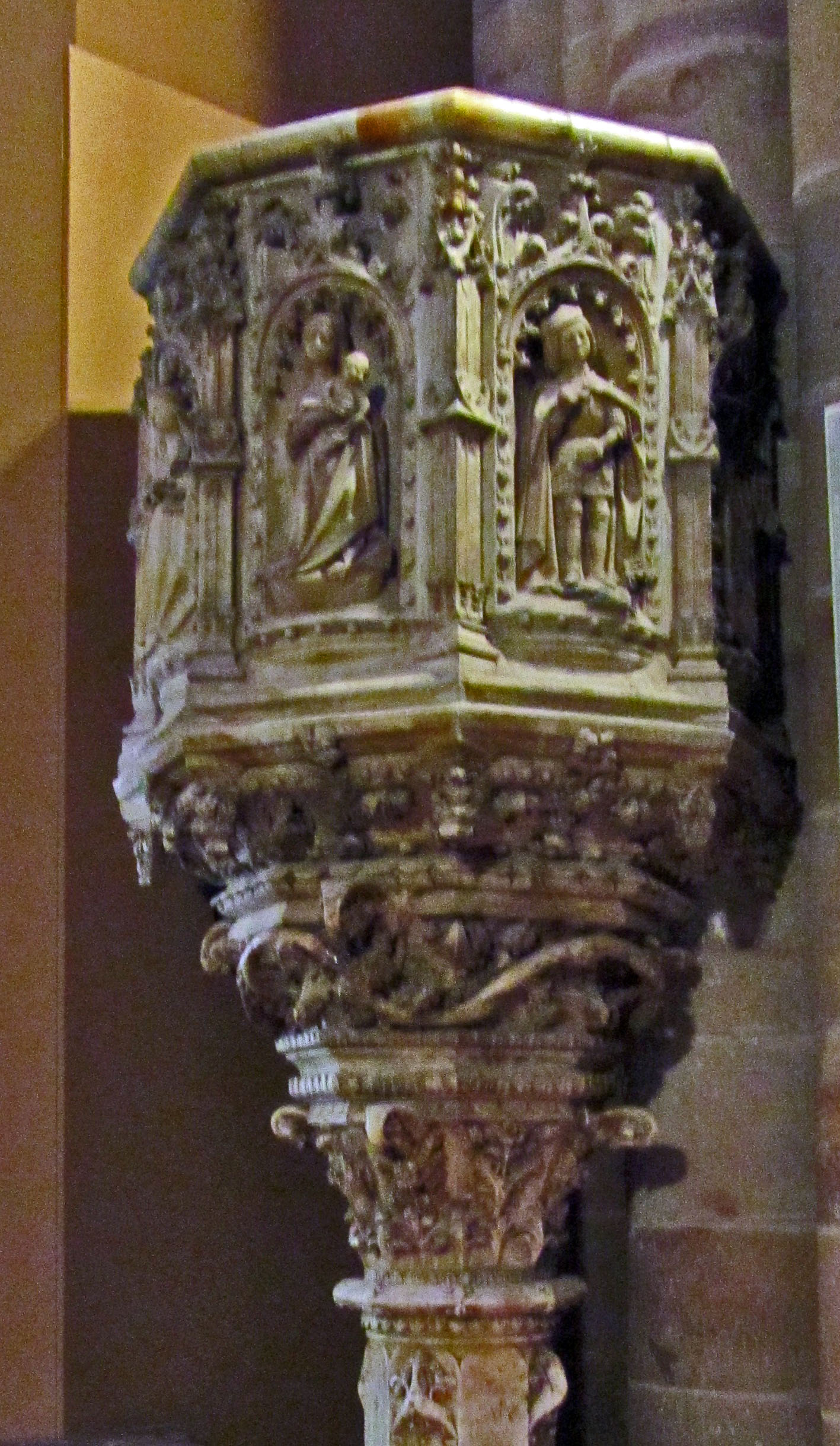
Pulpit of Epistle side.

It is located on the Gospel side next to the entrance of the main chapel. This pulpit was built at the end of the 16th century, it is an important work of Plateresque style with an octagonal plan and with scenes from the Passion of Christ. It is held on a cylindrical column of fustis striated with Ionic-Corinthian capital, was built by the artist Martin de Vandoma the year 1572.

==== Epistle pulpit ====
It is a pulpit that is on the Epistle side at the entrance to the main chapel. Made in white marble, it is Gothic in style, commissioned and donated by Cardinal Mendoza. It presents in its relief themes allusive to the cardinal-bishop; was made by Rodrigo Alemán in 1495–1496, is on an octagonal column with capital of Corinthian order.

==== Main Chapel ====
Located in what was the main apse of the Romanesque construction, it has a vaulted roof divided into nine parts, with seven windows of pointed arches. It had the primitive choir of alabaster attached to its walls and presided over by the chair of the bishop, until in the 16th century it was moved to the center of the main nave after the crossing and in 1491 the Cardinal Mendoza had a new wooden one built. It was during this bishop's time that the chapel was restored and the walls and vault of the apse were raised.

This enclosure is accessed between two pulpits, one Gothic and one Plateresque and by a Plateresque grid of wrought iron, made by Domingo de Zialceta in the year 1633, finished off with a calvary on his part superior carried out by Rodríguez Liberal.

In its interior on both sides are located several sepulchers. On the right wall of the Epistle, on the door that leads to the ambulatory, there is the Gothic-Burgundian burial, of the bishop Alfonso Carrillo de Albornoz, cardinal of San Eustaquio, (1424–1434); was commissioned by his nephew the bishop Alfonso Carrillo de Acuña, is the recumbent figure treated with great realism, and is held as an example of Castilian Gothic funerary sculpture of the 15th century, at its sides are the statues of St. Peter and St. Paul and above these some pinnacles ending in a row of blind arcades the sepulcher is inside an ogee Among others is also the sepulcher of Bishop Peter of Leucate, first builder of the cathedral, although the recumbent image was made, later, by order of Cardinal Mendoza, with pontifical dress, mitre and crosier, therefore with vestments after his death.

===== Main Altar =====
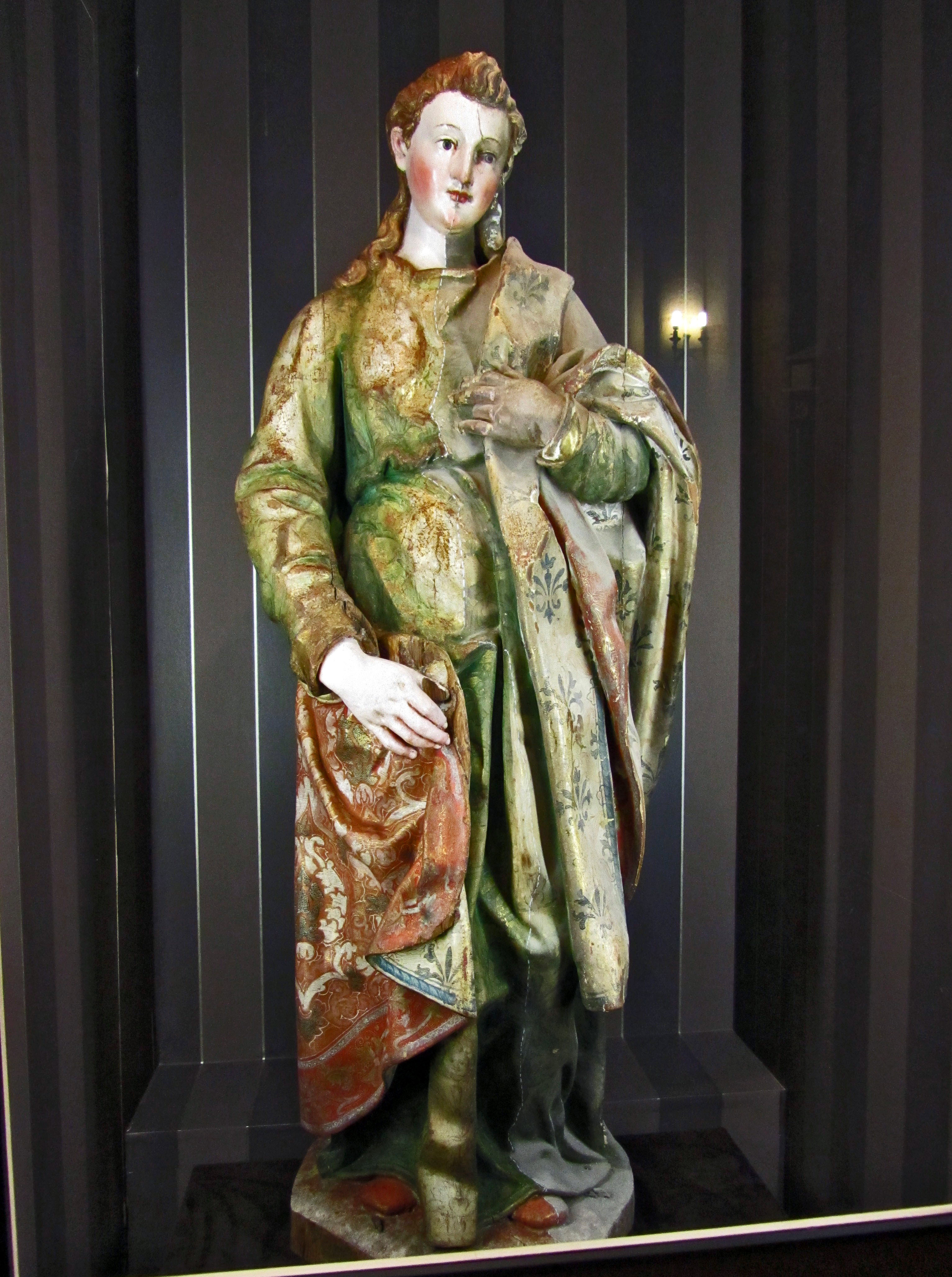
Image of Wilgefortis, in the second body of the main reredos.

The reredos for the Main chapel was commissioned by the Franciscan bishop Fray Mateo de Burgos to the sculptors Pompeo Leoni and Giraldo de Merlo, who signed the contract for its execution on September 24 of 1608. On the occasion of the death that same year of Pompeo Leoni, Giraldo de Merlo took charge of its realization. The traces were made, according to the desire of the bishop, occupying the maximum possible space but leaving free the upper part where they had to place some stained glasses, also donated by the same bishop. It was built between 1609 and 1613 in Mannerist style and the polychromy was made by painters Diego de Baeza and Mateo Paredes.

It consists of predella with three bodies of different orders, Ionic, Corinthian and compound, and a superior crowning. In the predella there are four reliefs with scenes of the Passion of Christ. In the first body, in the central street there is a tabernacle of three floors with the images of St. Peter and St. Paul, the Last Supper and on the top floor the Savior. In the side streets with the separation made with Ionic columns, the figures of Saint Andrew and Saint Francis of Assisi are at the ends, on the right side street the Transfiguration of Christ and on the left side the Immaculate Conception. In the second body the order of the columns is Corinthian, in the central street is the Assumption, on the right side a large relief of the Adoration of the Kings, in the side of the Nativity and in the extremes the images of Santa Ana and Santa Librada. In the third body in the central part there is a Calvary: Christ on the cross with Mary and Saint John the Baptist and on its sides the reliefs of the Pentecost and the Ascension of Christ with two exempt figures of saints in each end. The final crowning of the altarpiece was made with a large shield of the bishop commissioner supported by two angels and two representations of the virtues.

==== Choir ====
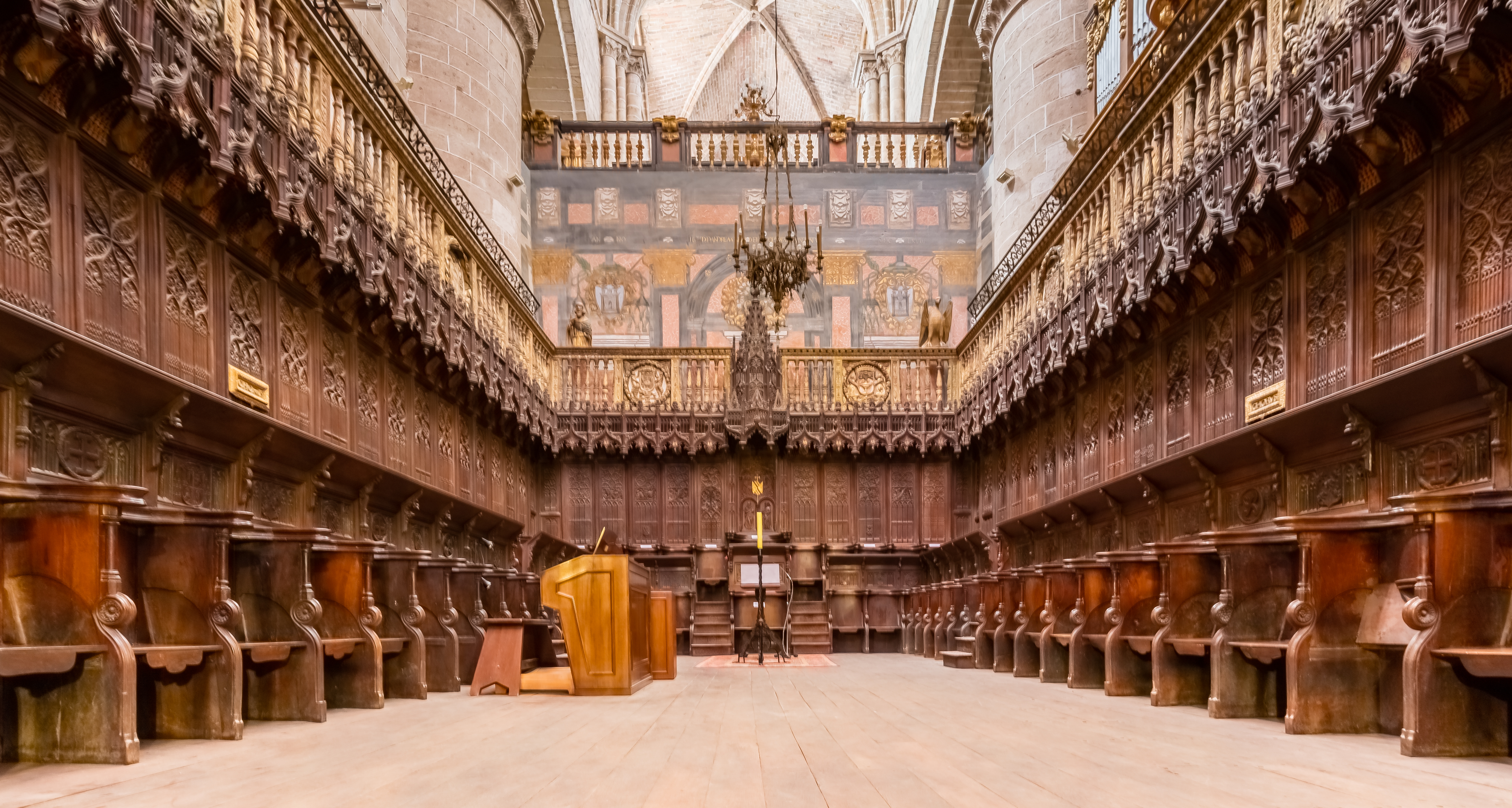
Choir of the Cathedral of Sigüenza.

Located in the center of the main nave, it was built on the initiative of the Cardinal Mendoza (1467–1495), replacing the previous one made in alabaster and that was placed first in the main chapel and later had been transferred to the central nave.

The back of the episcopal chair has carven images and the shield of Cardinal Mendoza.

There are two grandstands, where the Churrigueresque organ is located, with a Plateresque balustrade and shields of the cathedral chapter and the commanding bishop Fadrique de Portugal.

==== Pipe organs ====
The cathedral records that it had three pipe organs between the years 1522 and 1538, including one decorated by Juan Soreda.

On November 26, 2011, a new pipe organ was inaugurated, replacing one built in 1750 by the Navarrese pipe organ builder Joseph Loytegui which was destroyed during the Spanish Civil War in 1936.

==== Backchoir ====
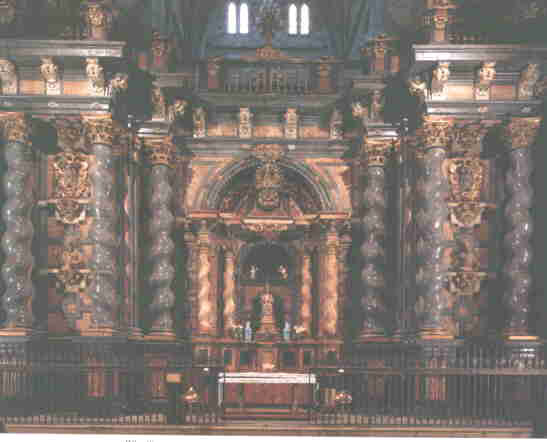
Reredos of the backchoir.

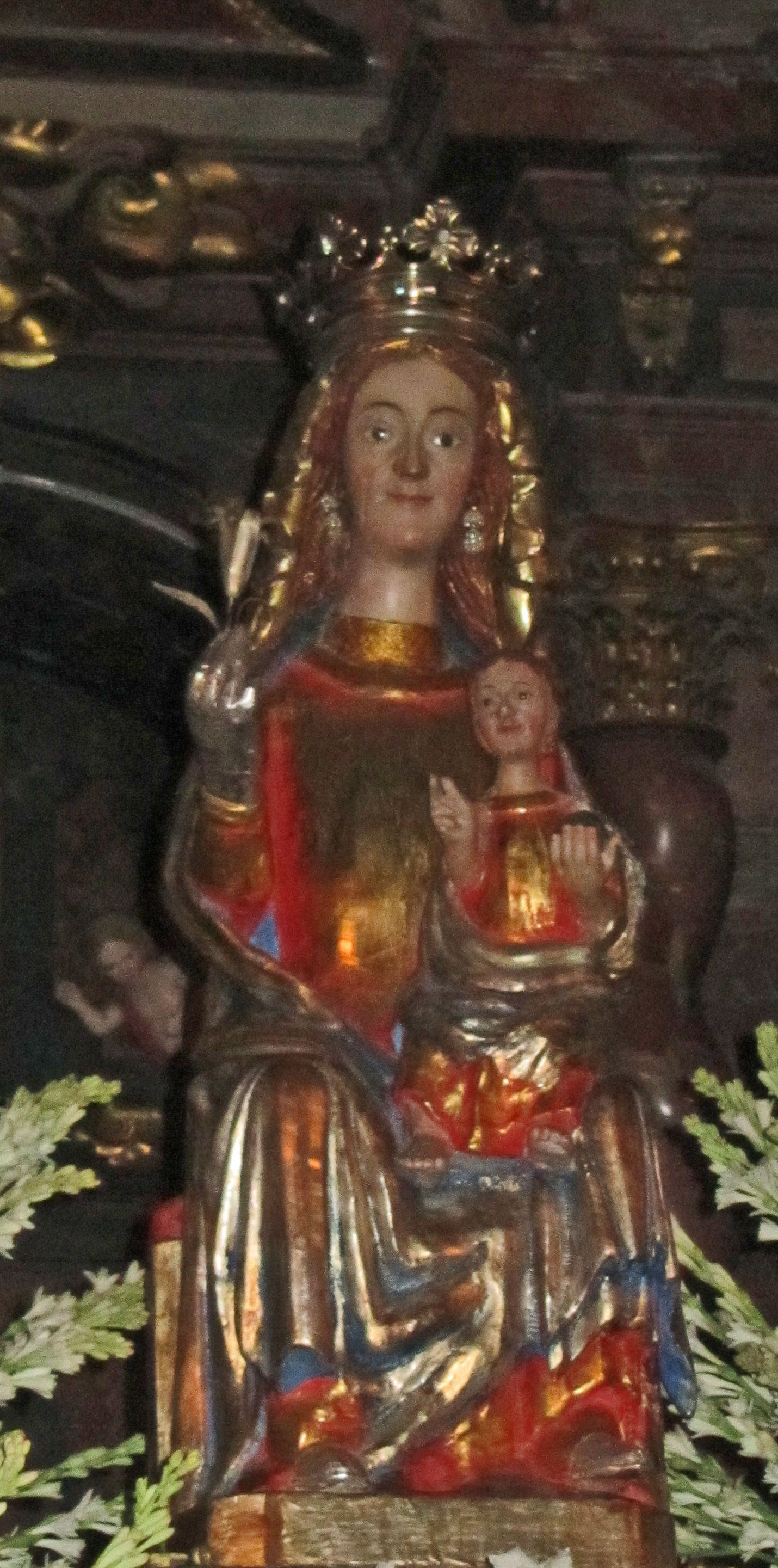
Image of Santa María de la Mayor.

In 1666 three reredoses attached to its wall were replaced with a Baroque reredos of Santa María de la Mayor. In a niche in the middle is an image of Santa María de la Mayor, patron saint of Sigüenza.

There is a Romanesque sculpture of the same saint from the 12th century made of polychrome cypress wood, with Jesus and holing a fleur-de-lis. Damaged in the 14th century, it was restored and covered with silver veneer. The image was damaged during the Spanish Civil War and restored in 1974.

=== Right nave or that of the epistle ===
In this nave no chapel is built. The reredos from the main entrance are dedicated to St. Bartholomew or St. Cecilia, which is located next to the door to climb the bell tower. Altar with Baroque reredos by 1718, dedicated to Saint Anne; the altar of Saint Paschal Baylon, also Baroque, from the year 1691 is located in the wall corresponding to the choir. Next to the reredos dedicated to Our Lady of the Snows of 1718, is the sepulcher of Pedro García de la Cornudilla of 1462, the figure of the recumbent is five feet eight inches tall, his head is missing and he is very deteriorated the rest of the monument.

== Cloister ==
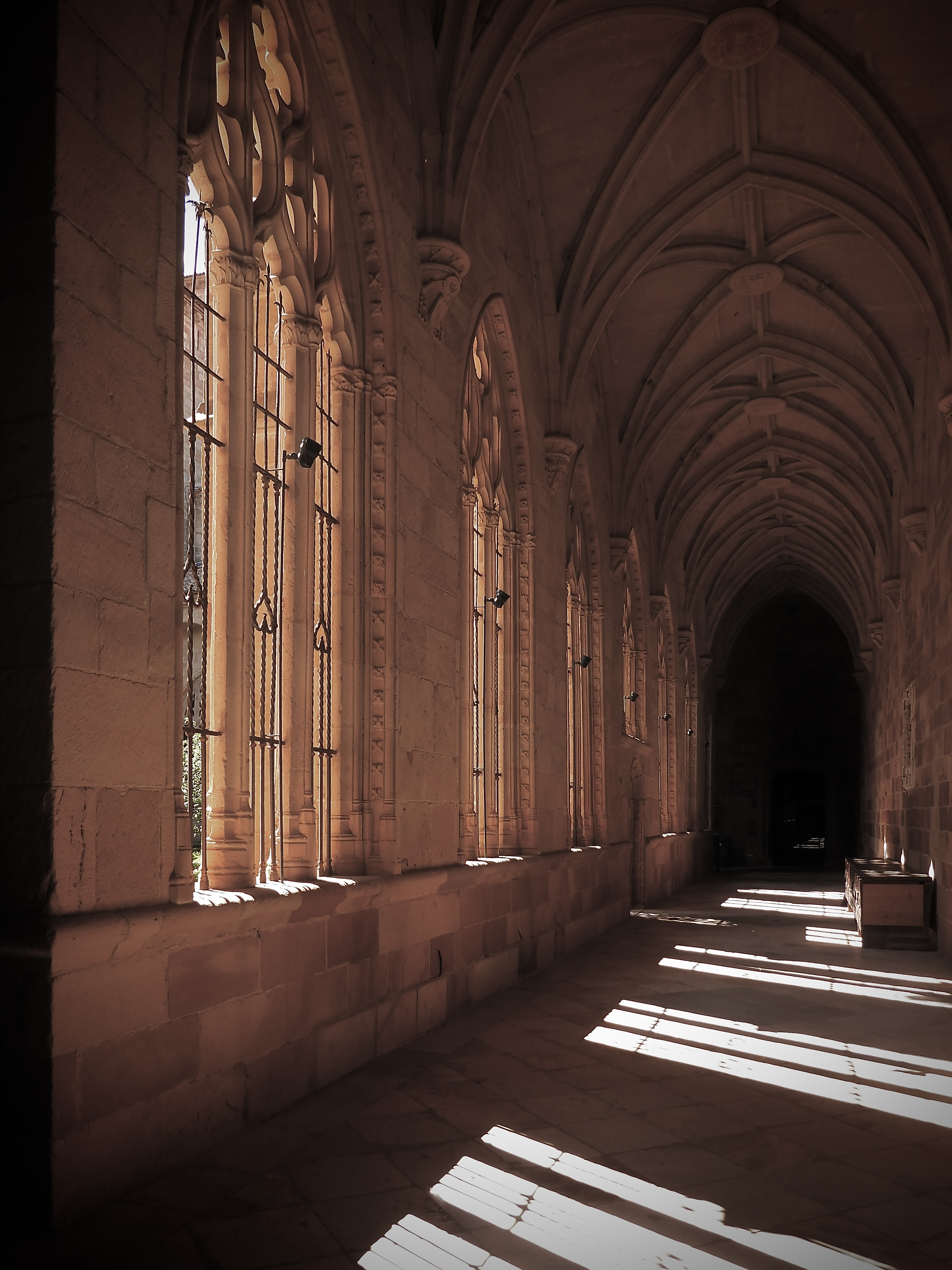
The eastern gallery of cloisters of the Catedral de Santa María de Sigüenza.

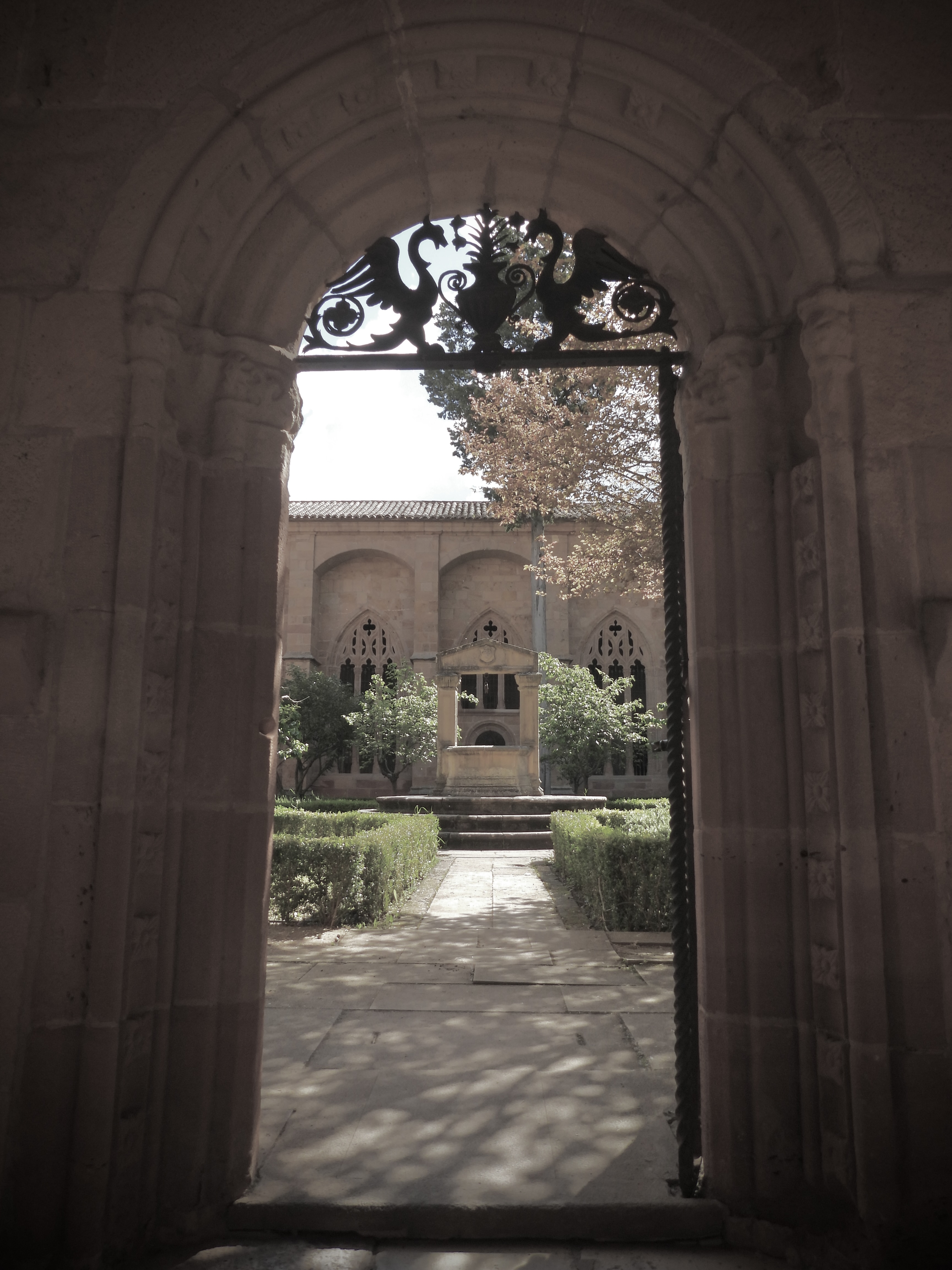
Looking out into the courtyard from the eastern gallery of cloisters of the Catedral de Santa María de Sigüenza

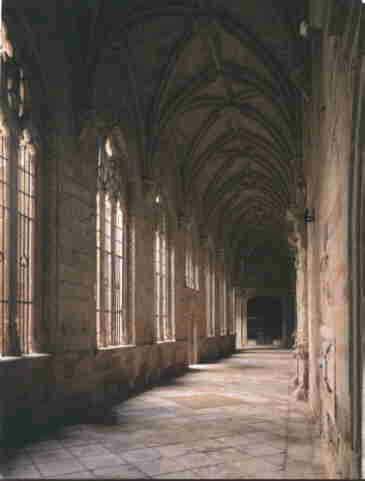
Cloister gallery.

The cloister is attached to the north wall in the central part of the cathedral building, has a square plan with a measure of forty meters per side, these galleries have each of them seven ogival large windows with Gothic drafts all these arcades are protected by iron gates of the same period. The four galleries of the cloister are known by different names, the northern one as "Panda de San Sebastián" or that of "de la bodega"; the one of the west as "Panda del Palacio"; the one of the east like "Panda de los Caballeros" or that of "del Cabildo" and the one of the south like "Panda de Santa Magdalena". They have two access doors to the courtyard where there is a garden and a central stone fountain. In all its walls it has several graves, as was normal to do at the time:

... next to "de los Caballeros" was given land to the sons of the church, noble and gentlemen; on the north side or «San Sebastián», the relatives of the canonges and beneficiaries were buried; the one of the west or "del Palacio" gave burial to the mortal remains of relative far from the capitulars; the one of noon or of "Santa Magdalena", served as grave to the raoneros canongen and squires.

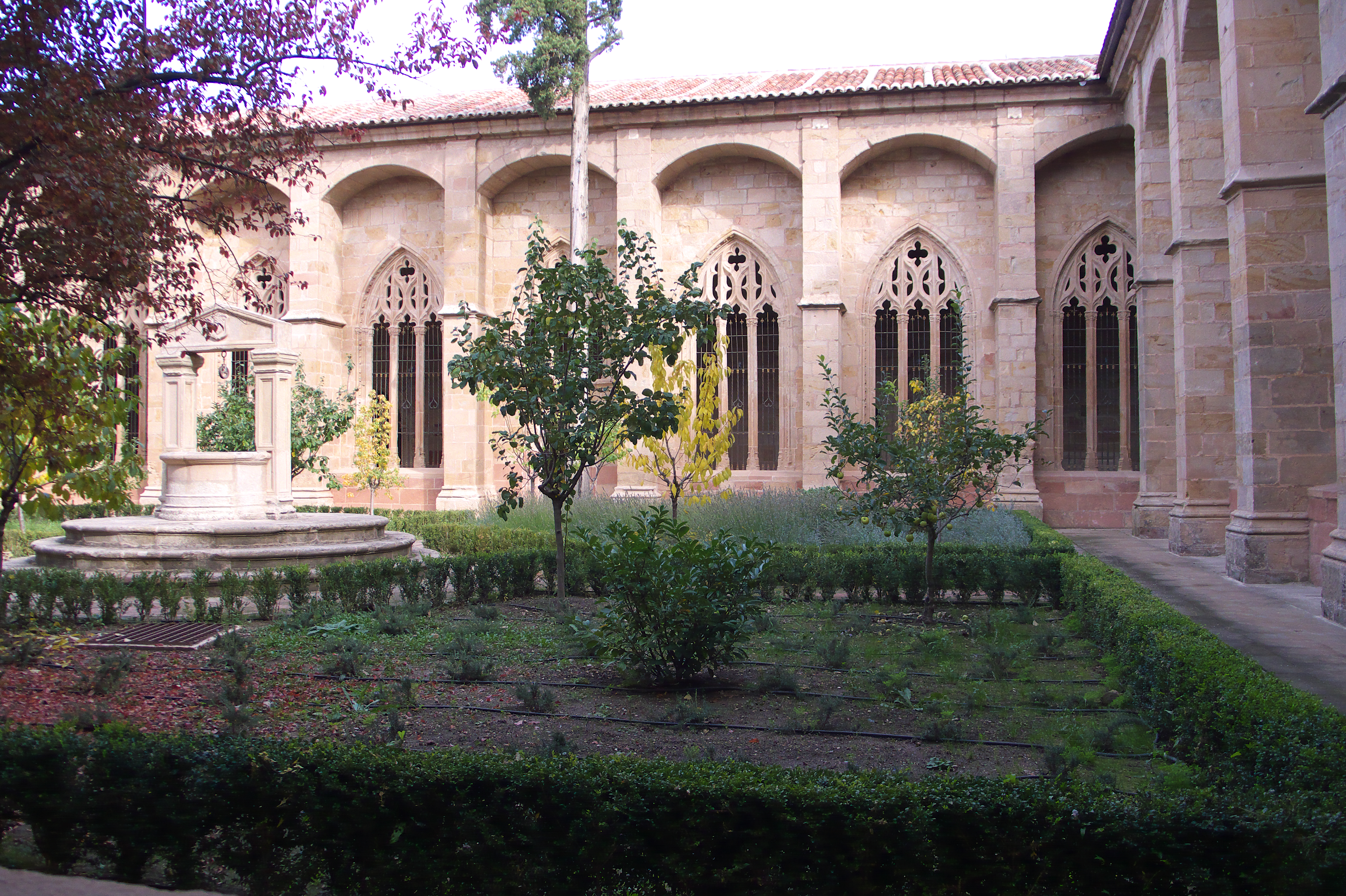
View of the cloister.

The new Gothic-style cloister, in substitution of the previous Romanesque one, which had a dilapidated wooden roof, was rebuilt in 1505, on the initiative of the bishop and Cardinal Bernardino López de Carvajal (1495–1511), already appointed cardinal and resident in Rome, with the help of Cardinal Cisneros, former senior chaplain of the cathedral in the time of the bishop Cardinal Mendoza. It is of Late Gothic style, with Renaissance elements, the vaults of the galleries are of sexpartite cross with the keystone in polychrome representing the shields of the cathedral chapter and the bishop López de Carvajal. In the eastern part, there is the summer chapter house, the old chapel of Our Lady of Peace and Diocesan Museum, which is decorated with a magnificent collection of Flemish tapestries, the chapel of Saint James, son of Zebedee and the library with a portal with Plateresque decoration of the 16th century. The south gallery is also dedicated to burials and the Puerta del Jaspe that communicates with the cathedral is located there. In the north gallery is the chapel of la Concepción and the western part is mediating with the parish of San Pedro, old sacristy.

=== Chapel of la Concepción ===
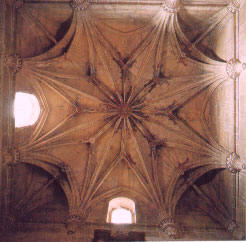
Gothic-Mudéjar rib vault of the Chapel of la Concepción.

The construction of the chapel of the Conception was carried out under the order of Bishop Diego Serrano the year 1509 for his and his family's burial and is the center of the chapel where the bishop had his sepulcher, which was due to retire and lose in the 17th century. There are shields of the bishop placed near the arch of the entrance with an inscription that says: "The protonotary D. Diego Serrano, Abbot of Santa Coloma, founder of this chapel, died on the fourteenth day of the month of March of 1522 years. Laus deo."

It is located in the north gallery of the cloister of the cathedral and is of Gothic style with Renaissance ornamentation such as grotesques and balusters. The vault is ribbed Gothic-Mudéjar with ribs and the decoration of the keystone is made with polychromy. On the walls there are remnants of old wall paintings, simulating large arcades with windows through which you can appreciate landscapes of gardens and cities made by the painter Francisco Peregrina.

Its portal opens between two very decorated pilasters and ends in a frieze, decorated with an image of the Virgin Mary in stone, below which is a scorching arch, very decorated. This door closes with a grille of wrought iron of the Master Usón dated between 1498 and 1519 with beautiful motifs like crowned sirens.

=== Cathedral Museum ===
The museum is located in three spaces located in the cloister in the Panda de los Caballeros.

The first room is the Chapter Room (12th to 16th centuries) that later became Library of the Cabildo (16th to 20th century),

... which has the first vault of ogives of the cathedral, with the arches starting from the ground, in a protogothic style, coexisting with its Romanesque wall, with a Romanesque rose window and windows with semicircular arch; this room is also called the Chapel of la Concepción de Nuestra Señora and has various objects, tapestries, busts of some bishop... etc.

— Luis Romo

The second room is the Summer Chapter Room, former chapel of Nuestra Señora de la Paz and also has tapestries and the old choir of the hall.

The third room is the one belonging to the old forge and can only be passed to it from a small door that communicates with the previous room or Summer Chapter Room. It also contains Flemish tapestries and is restored.

==== Tapestries ====
The bishop Andrés Bravo de Salamanca (1662–1668) commissioned sixteen tapestries for the cathedral treasury from the Brussels workshops of Jean Le Clerc and Daniel Eggermans. The tapestries were completed in 1668. Eight show Romulus and Remus and the other eight the mythological virtues of the goddess Athena.

== Sources ==
- Ávila, Ana (1993). Imágenes y símbolos en la arquitectura pintada española (1470-1560) (in Spanish). Barcelona: Anthropos. ISBN 84-7658-417-2.
- Gómez Moreno, Elena (1947). Mil Joyas del Arte Español, tomo I: Antigüedad y Edad Media (in Spanish). Barcelona: Instituto Gallach.
- Navascués Palacio, Pedro; Sarthou Carreres, Carlos (1997). Catedrales de España (in Spanish). Madrid: Espasa Calpe. ISBN 84-239-7645-9. OCLC 249825366. Edición especial para el Banco Bilbao Vizcaya
- Pérez Villamil, Manuel (1899). La Catedral de Sigüenza erigida en el siglo XII, con noticias nuevas para la historia del arte de España (in Spanish). Madrid.
