= El Doncel de Sigüenza =

Sculpture in Sigüenza Cathedral

El Doncel de Siguenza
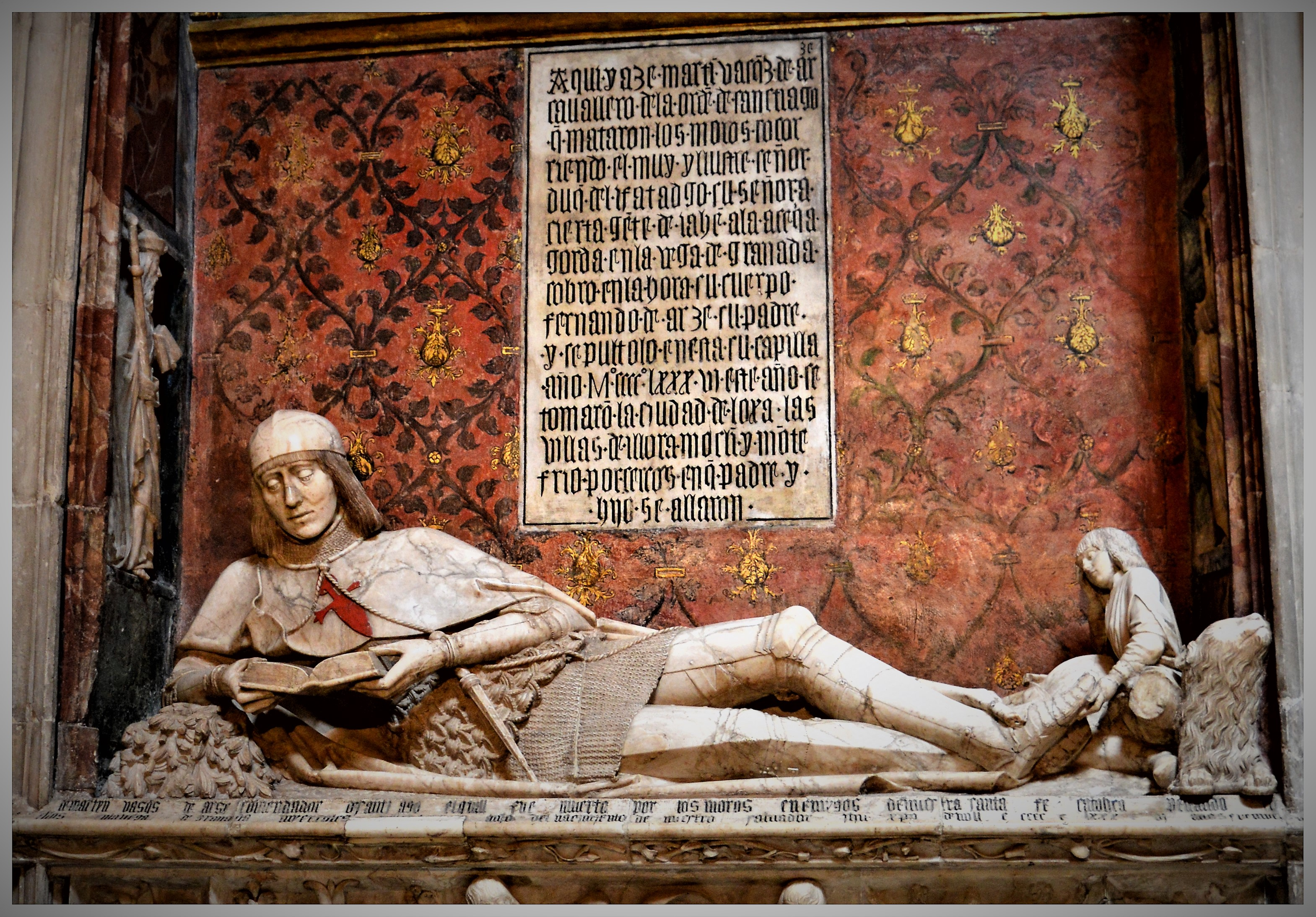
- Artists: Unknown, see attribution
- Year: possibly 1492
- Medium: Alabaster
- Movement: Spanish Gothic
- Subject: Martín Vázquez de Arce, page
- Location: Sigüenza

El Doncel de Sigüenza is a statue in Sigüenza Cathedral depicting a deceased soldier, Martín Vazquez de Arce, above his tomb in a chapel dedicated to him. It is a late Spanish Gothic work with apparent Italian Renaissance influence, but its creator is ultimately unknown.

== Martín Vazquez de Arce ==
According to the inscription written above the figure, Martín Vazquez de Arce was born in Castile and served the Mendoza family in Guadalajara at a young age. Working as page to the Duke of the Infantado in the Vega de Granada during the Granada War, he was killed at the age of 26 in 1486. His father took his body to Sigüenza, where he was interred in the cathedral. It is also known that he was the first body interred in the whole cathedral, and that his brother Fernando Vázquez de Arce commissioned the statue from an unknown artist.

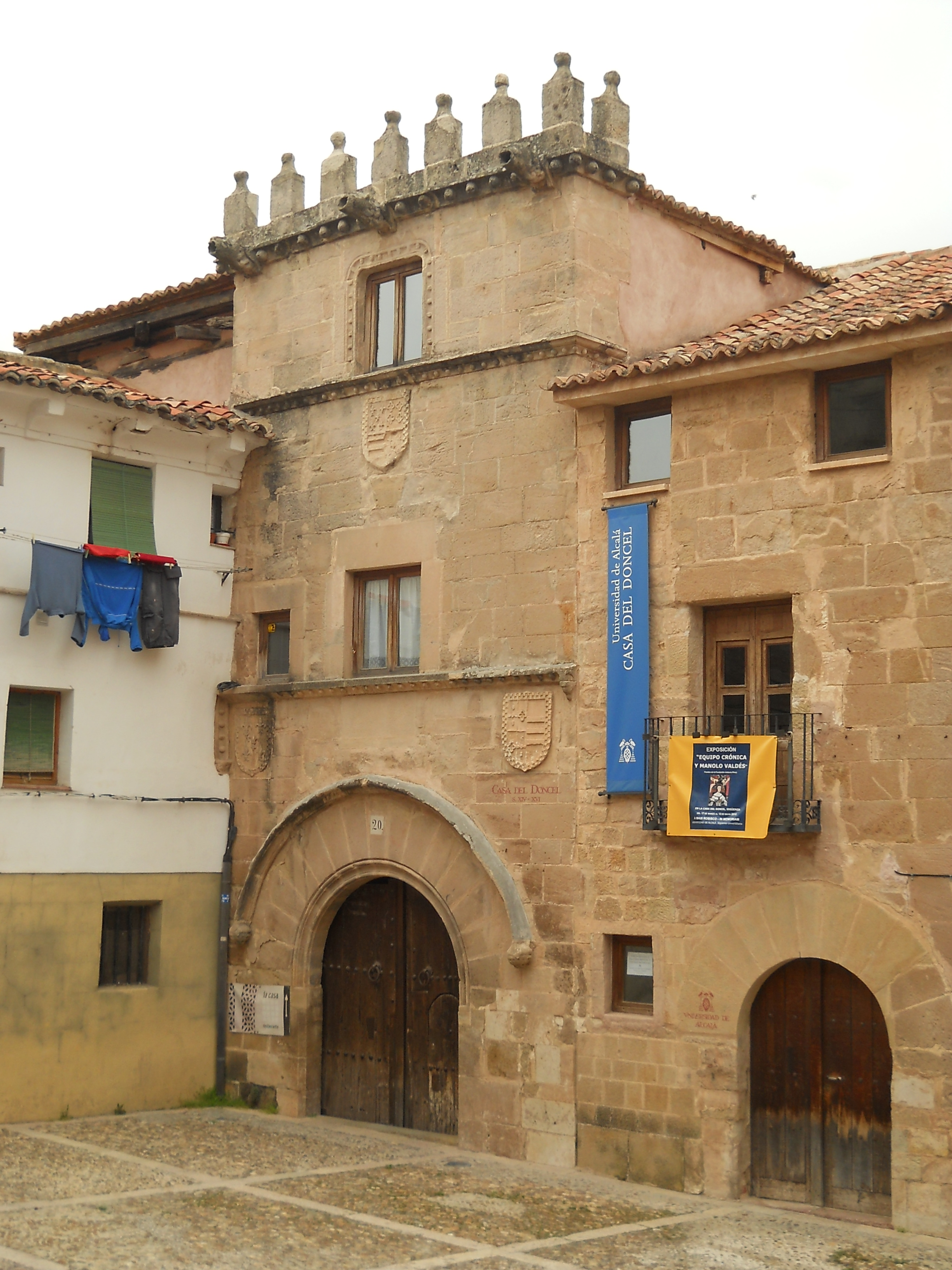
The Casa del Doncel, said to be Martín Vazquez de Arce's home.

Vazquez de Arce's daughter was later buried in the chapel, as well as other relatives. Also in Sigüenza is the Casa del Doncel, which is said to be his home. There is also a one Michelin star restaurant in Guadalajara called El Doncel, named for him and the statue.

== Qualities and description ==
The subject is sitting up slightly holding a lightly book with two hands. He wears a cloth covering his armor which consists of a coat of mail and a doublet. At his feet, a page cries and a dog rests. He is sitting up slightly, a very unusual posture for such a statue. On his chest is the red cross of the Order of Santiago, of which he was a member. The subject's legs are crossed with a serious face that is said to be closer to be happy than sad. He reads from a book gripped lightly in both hands. According to Ricardo de Orueta, "the piece awakens feelings of youth, elegance, spontaneity, gentleness, lassitude, and in a vague way, only sadness". In many aspects it is a work of the Renaissance.

== Attribution ==
The statue got international attention following the publication of Marcel Dieulafoy's Polychrome en Espagne. Dieulafoy, inexperienced in Spanish art of the period, had attributed the statue to Damià Forment, which is unlikely. In his Funerary Sculpture of Spain, a comprehensive guide to Spanish funerary art, Ricardo de Orueta noted similarities to Donatello, while acknowledging the impossibility (Donatello had died decades earlier). He categorized it as Spanish Gothic because of its ornamentation, and among the most significant works of the period. The statue has also been suggested as being by Andrea Sansovino. De Orueta concluded that the most likely attribution would be the architect of Church of San Ginés, Maese Juan, who apparently did a similar-looking statue in that church. Sebastián de Almonacid has also been suggested. According to Narciso Sentenach, it cannot be known for certain whether it was done by an Italian or Spaniard, although if it were Spanish, it would be the most advanced work Spanish work done to that date.

== In writing ==
José Ortega y Gasset called it the most beautiful sculpture in the world. Manuel García Morente adopted his pensiveness as symbolic of the action of philosophy.

== Inscription ==
In English, the text above him reads,

HERE LIES MARTIN VASQUEZ DE ARCE, CAVALIER OF THE ORDER OF SANTIAGO, WHOM THE MOORS KILLED WHILE WITH HIS CAPTAIN, THE MOST ILLUSTRIOUS SENOR, THE DUKE OF INFANTADO. HE WENT TO THE SUCCOR OF A PARTY OF SOLDIERS FROM (AEN IN THE BIG TRENCH IN THE VEGA OF GRANADA. HIS FATHER, FERNANDO DE ARCE, RECOVERED HIS BODY IMMEDIATELY AND BURIED IT IN THIS HIS CHAPEL IN THE YEAR MCCCCLNXXVI. IN THIS SAME YEAR THE CITY OF LORCA AND THE TOWNS OF ILLORA, MOCLIN, AND MONTEFRIO WERE REDUCED BY ASSAULTS IN WHICH FATHER AND SON TOOK PART.

== Gallery ==
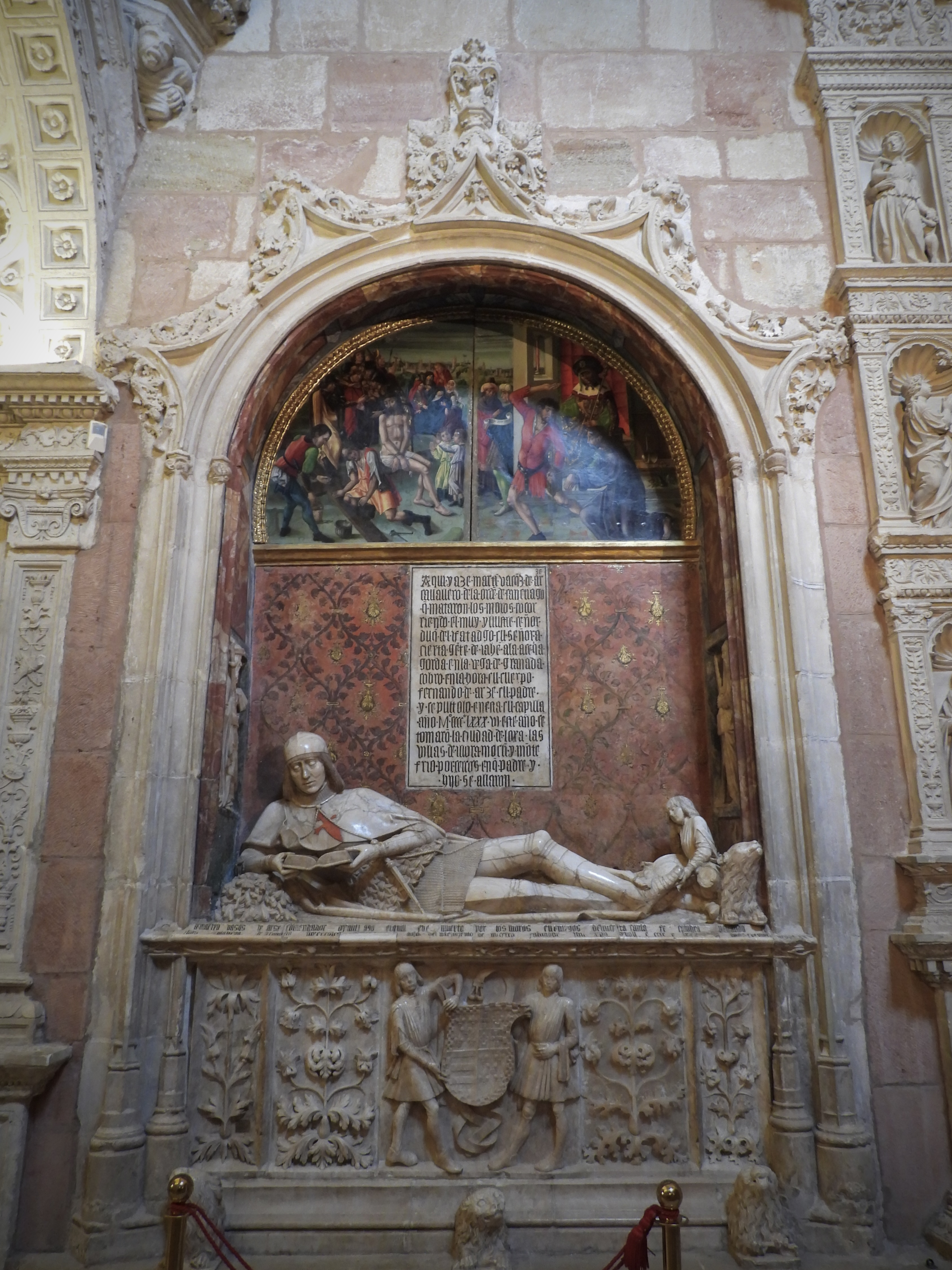
The sepulcher of El Doncel de Sigüenza.

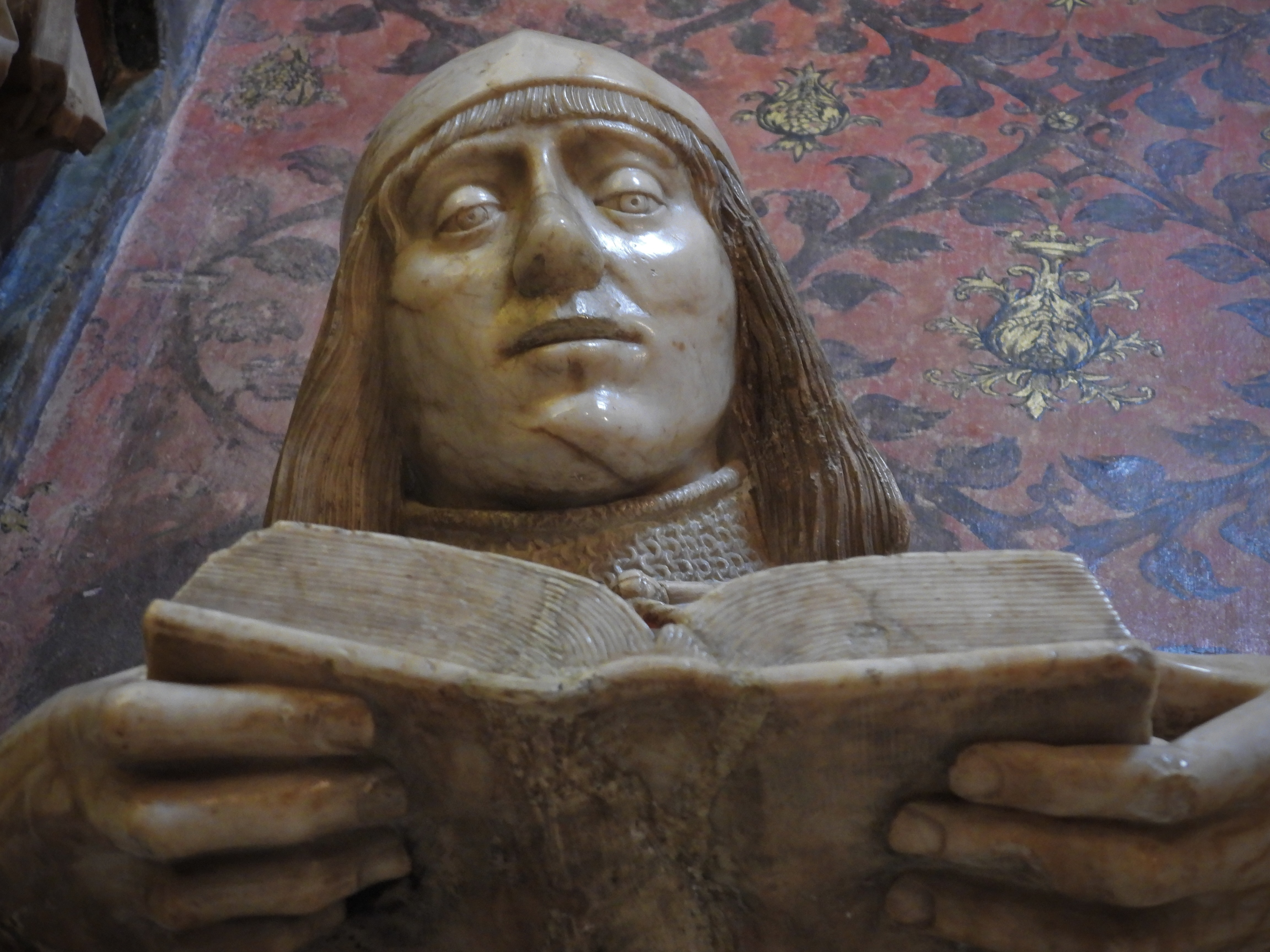
A close-up of the head of the sepulcher of El Doncel de Sigüenza.

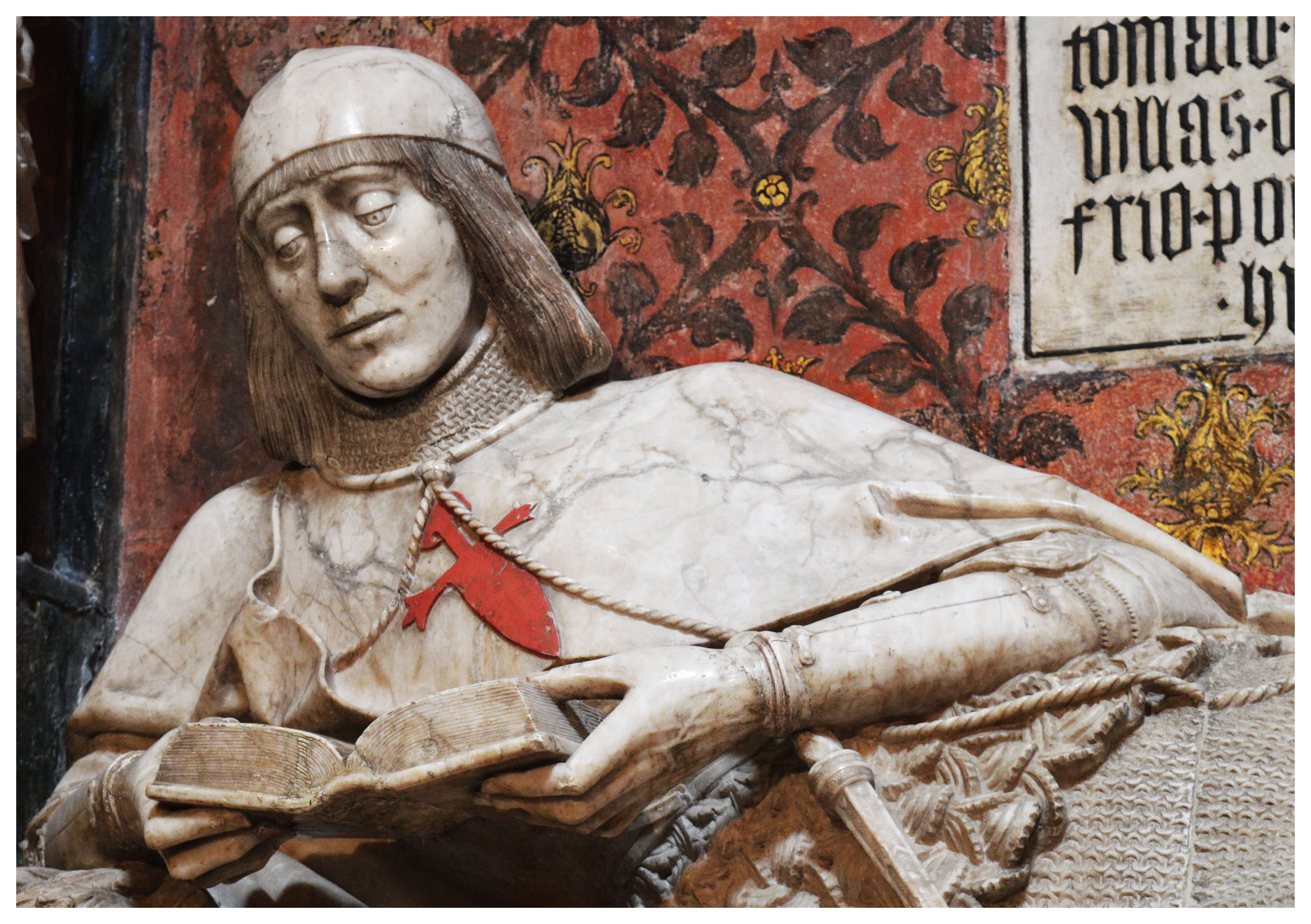
His face in detail

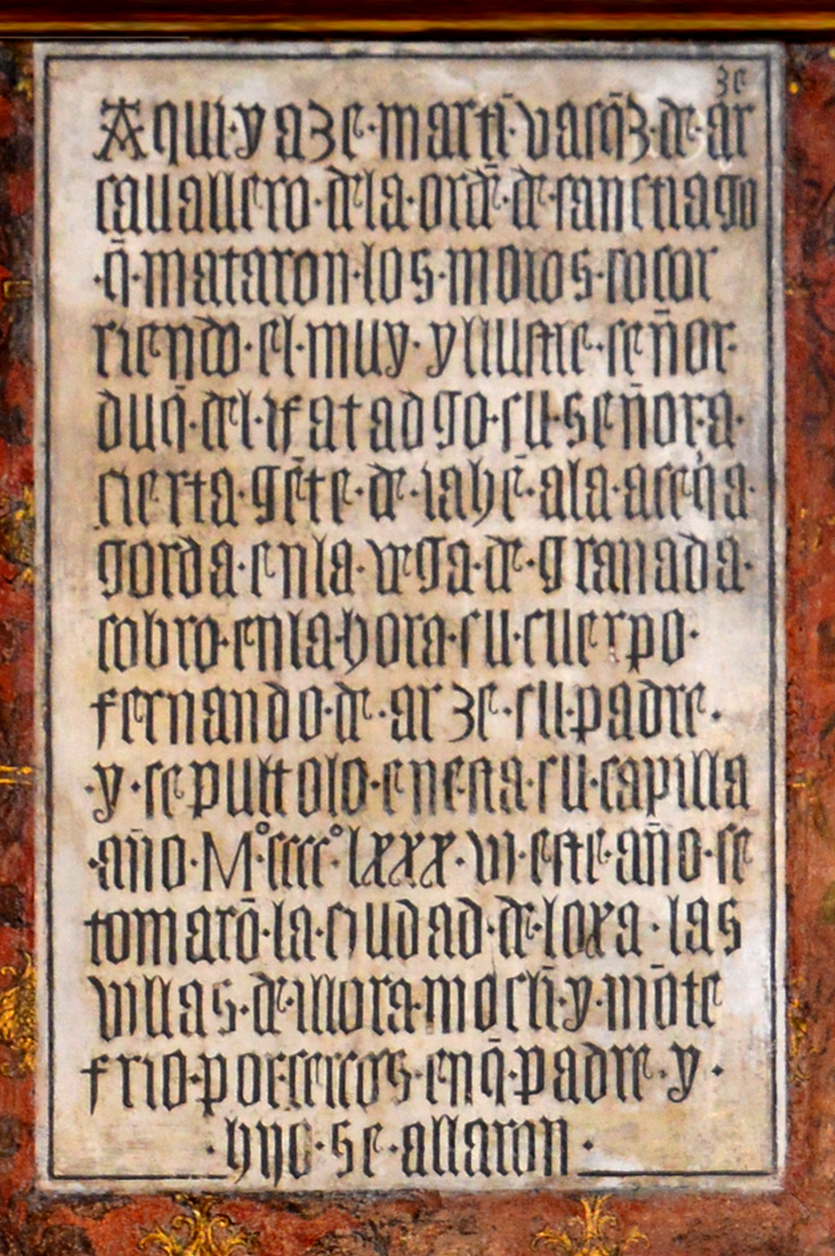
The inscription above

His page and dog

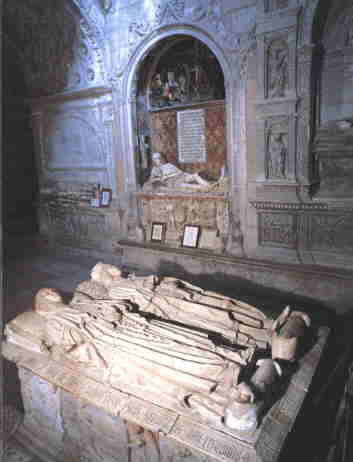
Another view of the chapel

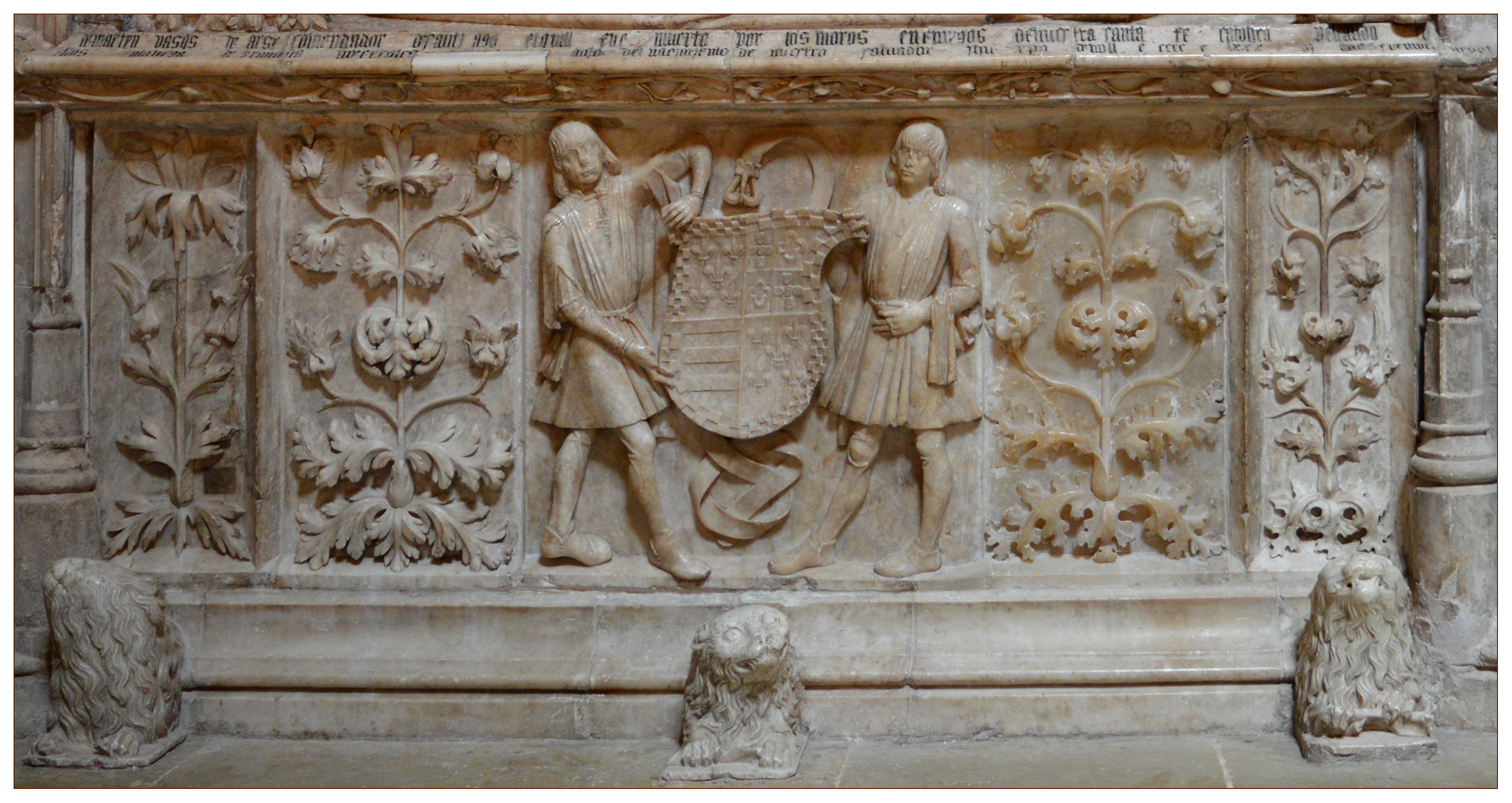
Under the statue
