= Carabias =

Carabias may refer to places in Spain:

- Carabias, Guadalajara, a village in the Sigüenza municipality
- Carabias, Segovia, a municipality
