= Diego Fernández de Córdoba =

Diego Fernández de Córdoba may refer to:

- Diego Fernández de Córdoba (died 1435), lord of Baena
- Diego Fernández de Córdoba (died 1450), lord of Chilló, Espejo and Lucena
- Diego Fernández de Córdoba y Montemayor (died 1481), counsellor of King Henry IV of Castile
- Diego Fernández de Córdoba y Carrillo de Albornoz (died 1487), counsellor of King Henry IV of Castile
- Diego Fernández de Córdoba y Arellano, marqués de Comares (1463–1518), Governor of Oran and Mazalquivir and first Viceroy of Navarre
- Diego Fernández de Córdoba y Mendoza, 3rd Count of Cabra (fl. 1487–1525)
- Diego Fernández de Córdoba, 3rd marquis of Comares (1524-1601), called "El Africano", Governor of Orán and Mazalquivir.
- Diego Fernández de Córdoba, 1st Marquess of Guadalcázar (1578–1630)
