= Castle of Riba de Santiuste =

- Castillo de Riba de Santiuste (Spanish)
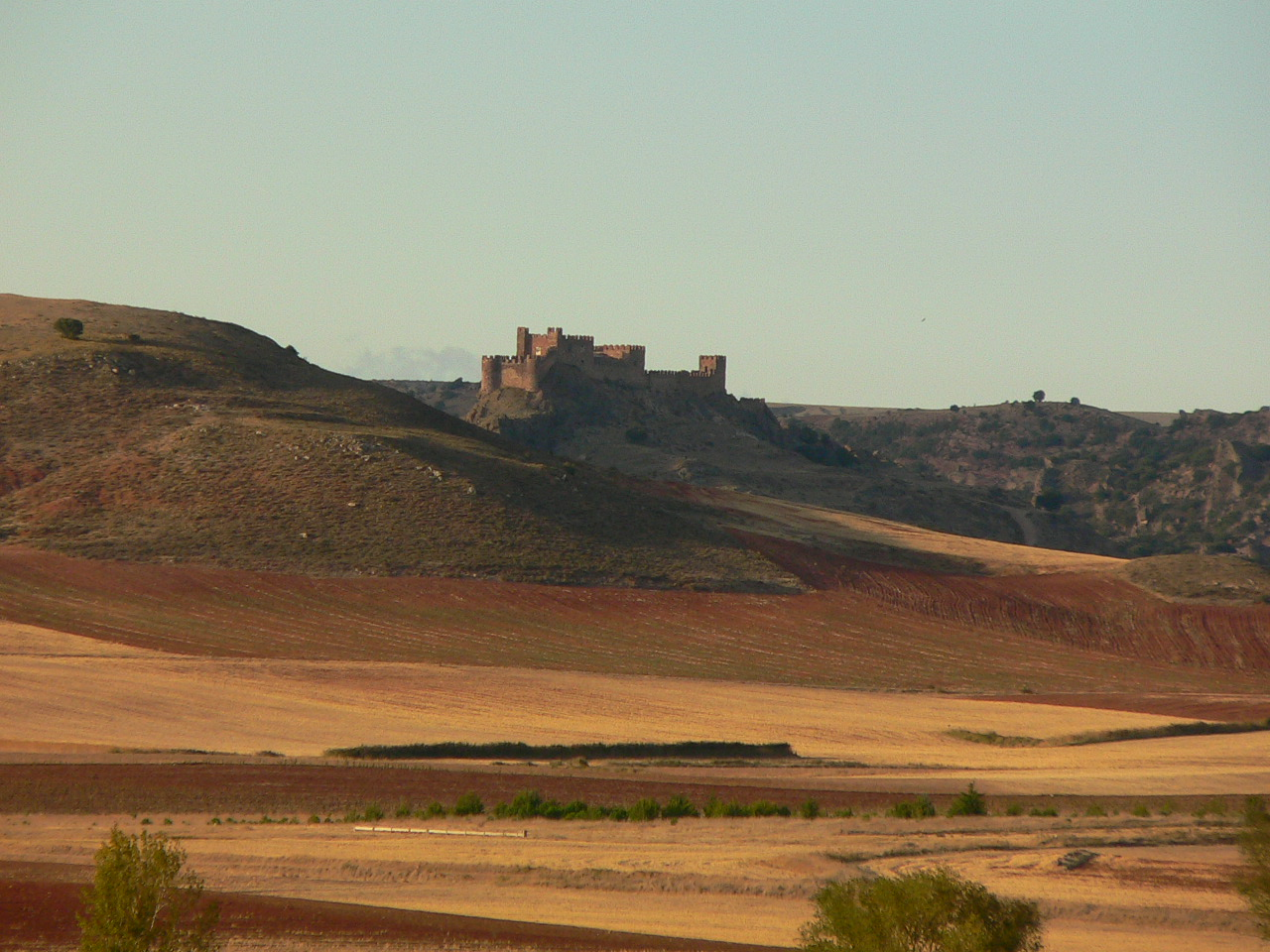

- Location within Spain
- 41.196882°N 2.709059°W
- Location: Sigüenza, Spain

Spanish Cultural Heritage
- Official name: Castillo de Riba de Santiuste
- Type: Non-movable
- Criteria: Monument
- Designated: 1992
- Reference no.: RI-51-0007286

The Castle of Riba de Santiuste (Spanish: Castillo de Riba de Santiuste) is a castle located in Sigüenza, Spain. It was declared Bien de Interés Cultural in 1992. The castle was rebuilt twice: in 15th century for the first time and in 19th century after it had been partially destroyed.
