= El Ordial =

El Ordial, Spain
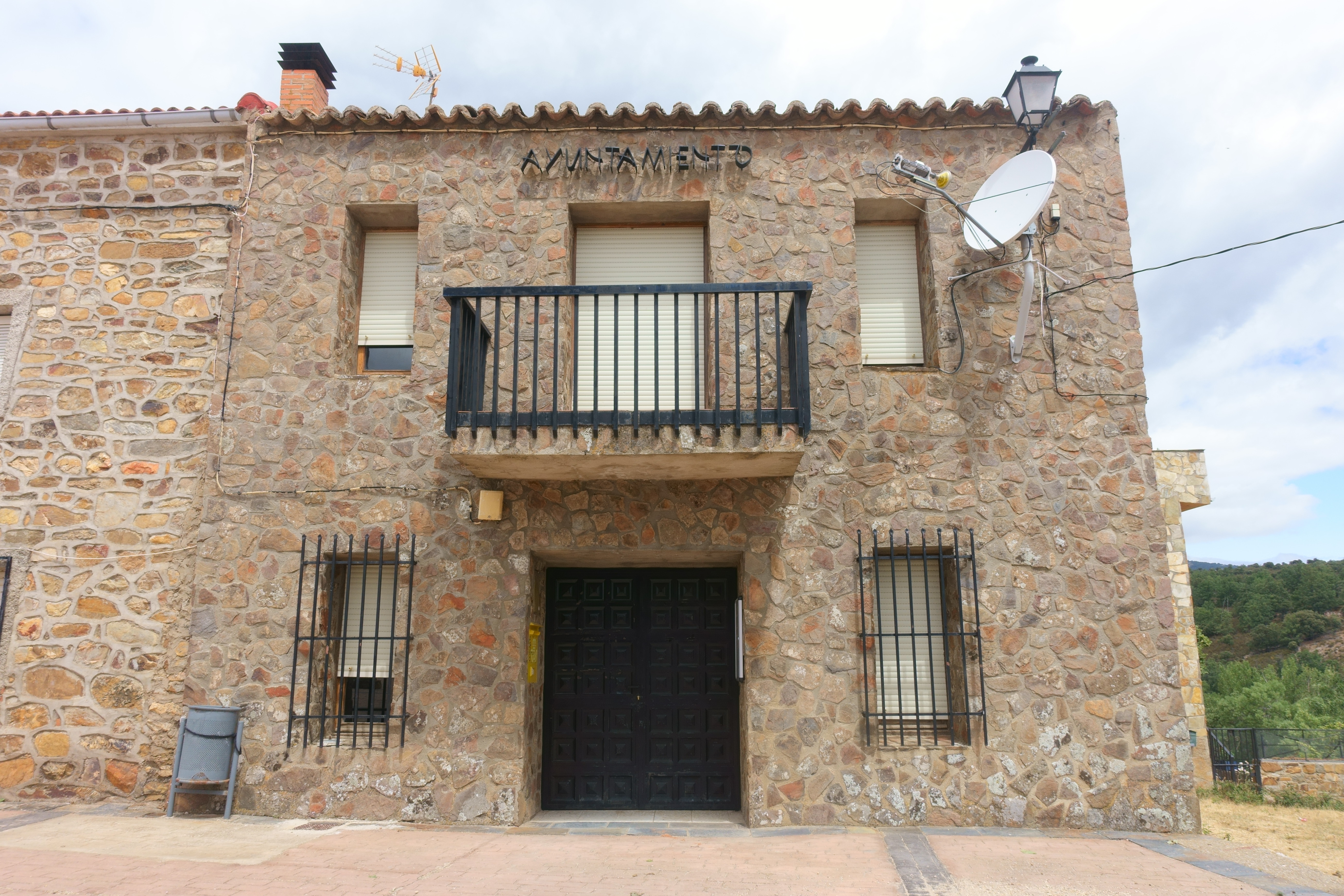
- Town hall

- Location within Province of Guadalajara Location within Castilla-La Mancha Location within Spain
- Coordinates: 41°07′48″N 3°06′51″W
- Country: Spain
- Autonomous community: Castile-La Mancha
- Province: Guadalajara
- Municipality: El Ordial

Area
  - Total: 29 km^{2} (11 sq mi)

Population (2025-01-01)
  - Total: 45
  - Density: 1.6/km^{2} (4.0/sq mi)
- Time zone: UTC+1 (CET)
  - Summer (DST): UTC+2 (CEST)

El Ordial is a municipality situated in the province of Guadalajara, within the autonomous community of Castile-La Mancha, Spain. According to the 2004 census (INE), the municipality has a population of 48 inhabitants. As of January 2024, the municipality has a population of 36 inhabitants.

== Geography and Location ==
El Ordial is located at approximately 41°7'46" N latitude and 3°6'56" W longitude, at an elevation of 1,235 meters above sea level. The municipality covers an area of 29.98 square kilometers, resulting in a population density of about 1.2 inhabitants per square kilometer.

== Demographics ==
The population of El Ordial has experienced a gradual decline over the past decades. In 1981, the municipality had 25 inhabitants, which decreased to 34 by 1991. The population further declined to 33 by 2013. As of January 2014, the population estimate is 36.

== Government, Economy, and Infrastructure ==
El Ordial is governed by a municipal council, known as the "ayuntamiento." The current mayor is Bernardino Domingo Escribano.

The municipality's economy is primarily based on agriculture and livestock, with a focus on traditional practices. Due to its small population, El Ordial has limited infrastructure, with basic services such as water supply, waste management, and road maintenance managed by the local council.

== Cultural and Historical Aspects ==
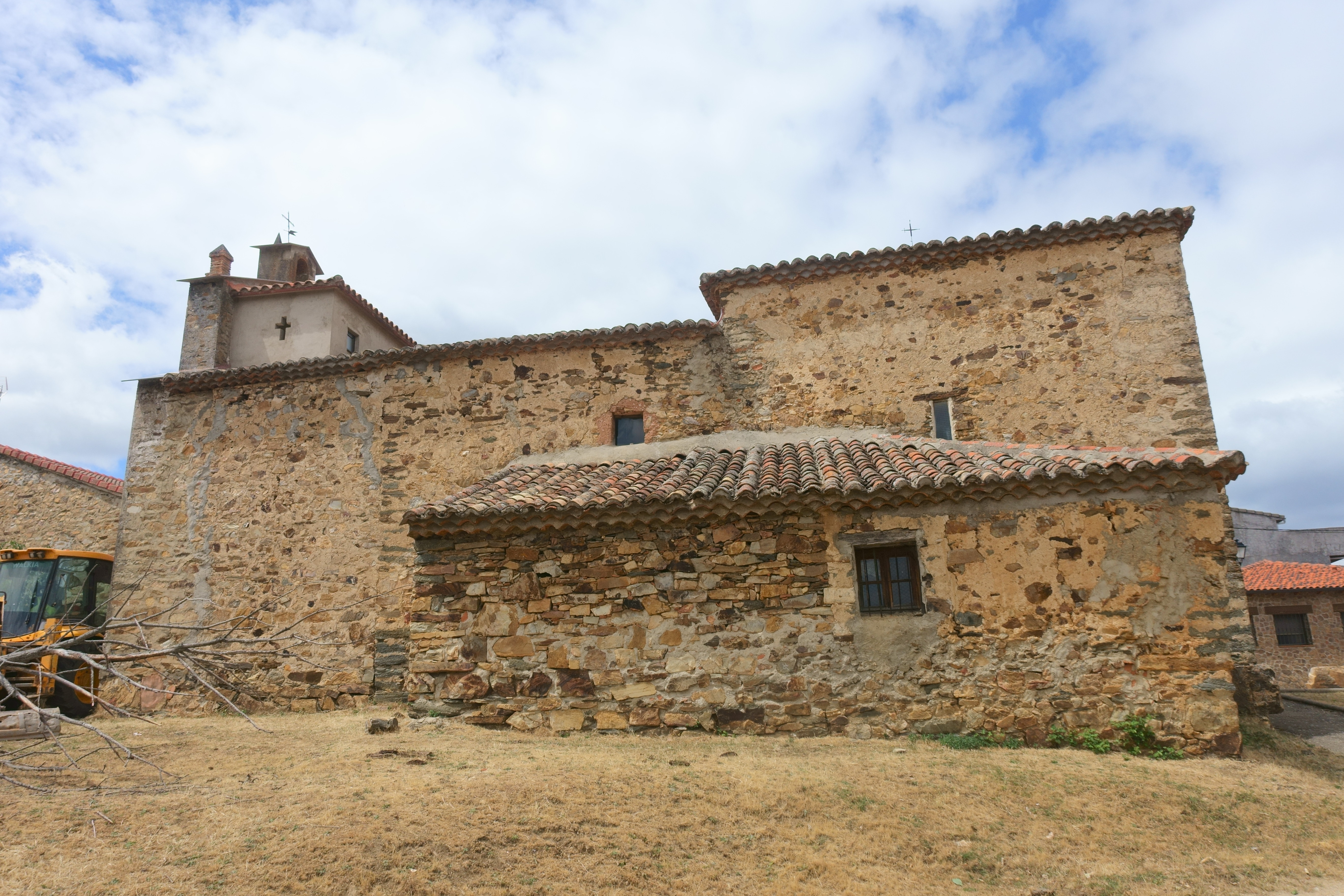
Iglesia de San Sebastián, El Ordial

El Ordial is part of the historical region known as the Serranía de Guadalajara, characterized by its mountainous terrain and rich natural landscapes. The municipality is home to the Church of San Sebastián, a notable landmark in the area.
