= Donzel =

Donzel may refer to:

- Doncel, a court appointment in late medieval Spain
- Donzel, a village in Bernheze, Netherlands
- Hugues-Fleury Donzel (1791–1850), French entomologist
