= Nuestra Señora de los Huertos, Sigüenza =

Church in Sigüenza, Spain

Coordinates: 41.0711°N 2.6434°W

Nuestra Señora de los Huertos or Santa María de los Huertos (Our Lady of the Orchards) is a late-Gothic and Renaissance church near Sigüenza, in the autonomous community of Castilla-La Mancha, Spain. Since 1940s, the church has been affiliated with an adjacent Clarissan order monastery.

The church was erected in the 16th century with Plateresque decoration. The main portal is highly decorated. Outside the church was a cemetery, used till 1906, for the poor who died in the Hospital de San Mateo.
