= Church of Nuestra Señora de la Asunción (Pinilla de Jadraque) =

- Iglesia de Nuestra Señora de la Asunción (Spanish)
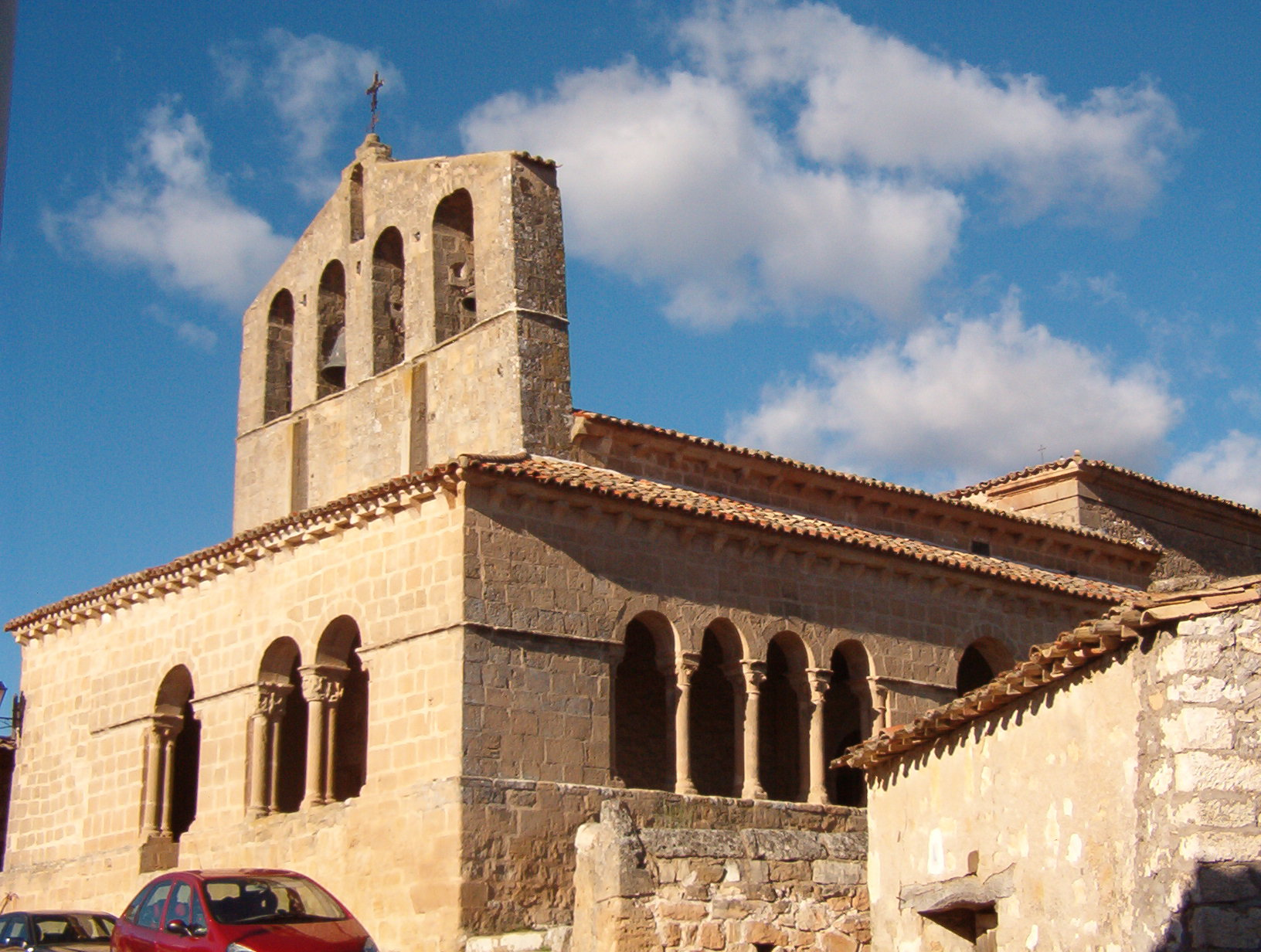

- Location within Spain
- 41.020407°N 2.94189°W
- Location: Pinilla de Jadraque, Spain

Spanish Cultural Heritage
- Official name: Iglesia de Nuestra Señora de la Asunción
- Type: Non-movable
- Criteria: Monument
- Designated: 1965
- Reference no.: RI-51-0001645

The Church of Nuestra Señora de la Asunción (Spanish: Iglesia de Nuestra Señora de la Asunción) is a Roman Catholic church located in Pinilla de Jadraque, Spain. It was declared Bien de Interés Cultural in 1965.

The parish church was built in the 12th or 13th century in a Romanesque style. Over the years, it was refurbished, and in this century, the interiors were burned.
