= La Serranía =

Comarca in the Spanish province of Guadalajara

Coordinates: 41°03′04″N 2°52′59″W

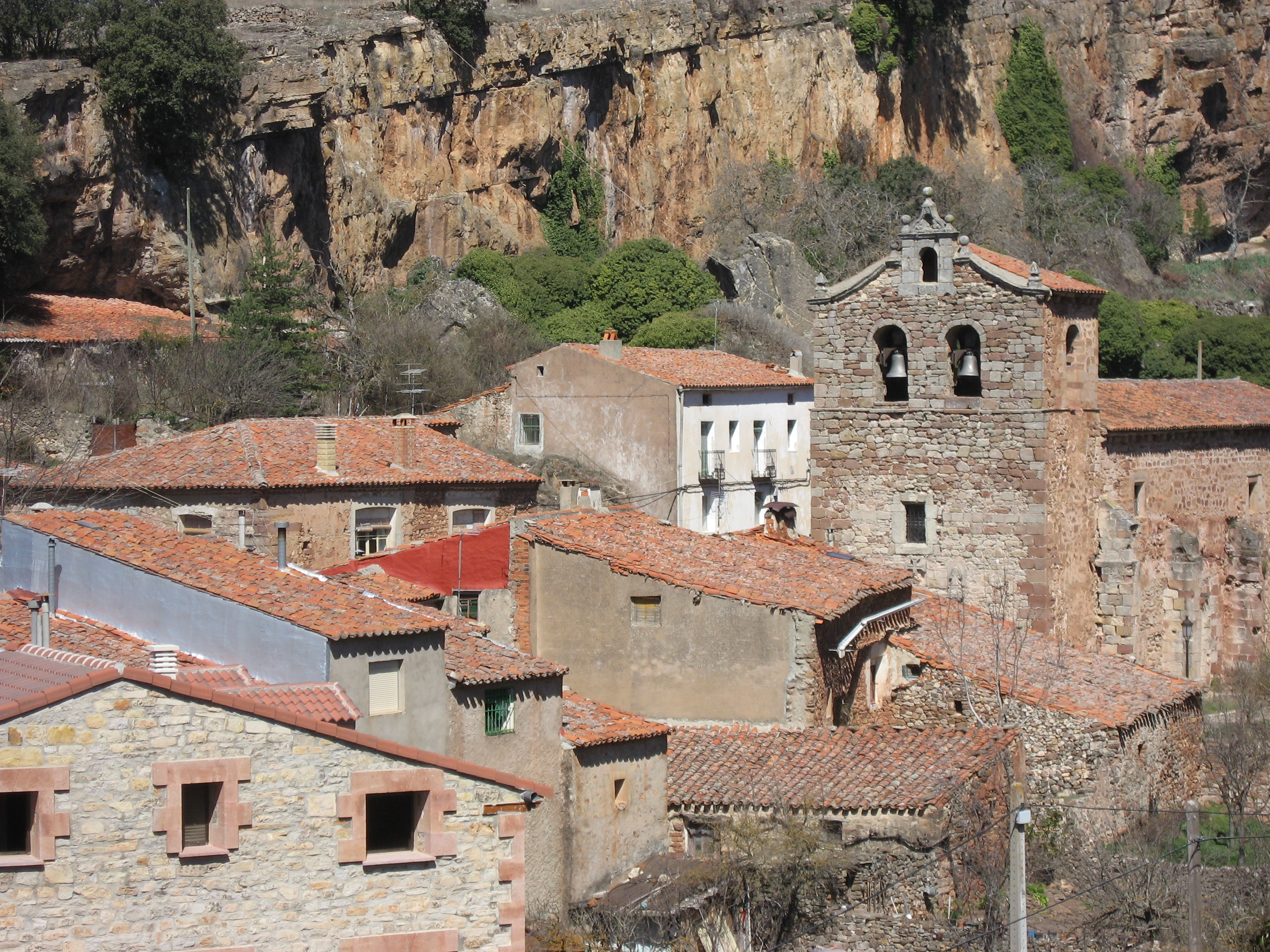
Anguita, a typical village in La Serranía.

La Serranía is a comarca located in the northwest of the Spanish province of Guadalajara. It extends for more than 3,000 square kilometres (1,200 sq mi), with a rugged topography.

It features a large number of natural, historical, artistic, and ethnological items of interest. Much of the Serranía is protected natural area, such as places of community importance, bird refuges, and the natural parks of the Sierra Norte de Guadalajara and the Barranco del Río Dulce.

The peaks of the Sierra de Ayllón dominate the steep landscape of the western part of the comarca, characterized by its rugged terrain and its high average elevation, more than 2,000 metres (6,600 ft). In the eastern part, in the Pela and Ministra mountain ranges, the elevations are lower and the slopes much less steep, generally below 1,500 metres (4,900 ft).

The abundance of slate and gneiss, especially in the Sierra de Ayllón, along with the associated nature of oaks, junipers and beech trees, have provided materials for the construction of black architecture, very well preserved in the municipalities of Campillo de Ranas, Majaelrayo and Valverde de los Arroyos. Numerous castles, such as those of Galve de Sorbe, Atienza, Sigüenza or Jadraque, the temples that make up the rural Romanesque and the historical-artistic ensembles of Atienza, Palazuelos and Sigüenza, also constitute some of the architectural and tourist attractions of the Serranía de Guadalajara. To these is added the ethnological and cultural heritage in the form of festivals, such as the Caballada de Atienza (declared a Festival of National Tourist Interest), the dances of the Octava del Corpus de Valverde de los Arroyos, the dances of the Santo Niño de Majaelrayo and the botargas from numerous locations.

== History ==
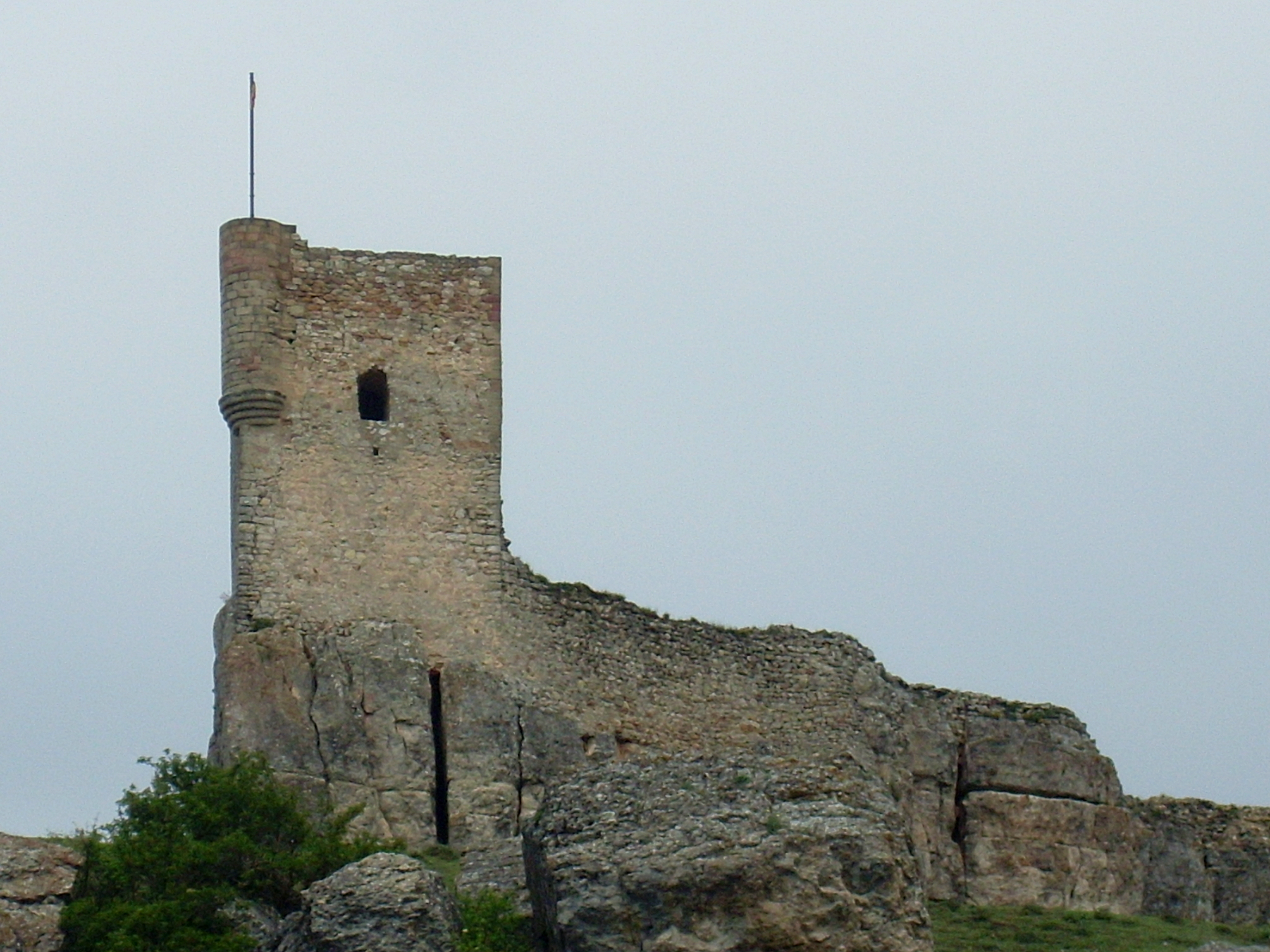
The Atienza castle is citadel of Andalusian origin that was in use up to the nineteenth century, when it began to deteriorate.

Abundant archaeological sites from the Iron Age have been found, especially around Sigüenza. There are deposits in Santamera, Riosalido and Castilviejo de Guijosa.

During the Romanization of Hispania in the second century BC, Sigüenza was one of the last Arevaci bastions to fall. Roman roads still exist in these environs and remains of mansions, cauponas, taverns and mutationes have been found in places like Mandayona, Palazuelos, Carabias and Alcuneza.

There are few Visigoths remains, as in the rest of the Iberian Peninsula, although regalia have been found in a cemetery in Palazuelos.

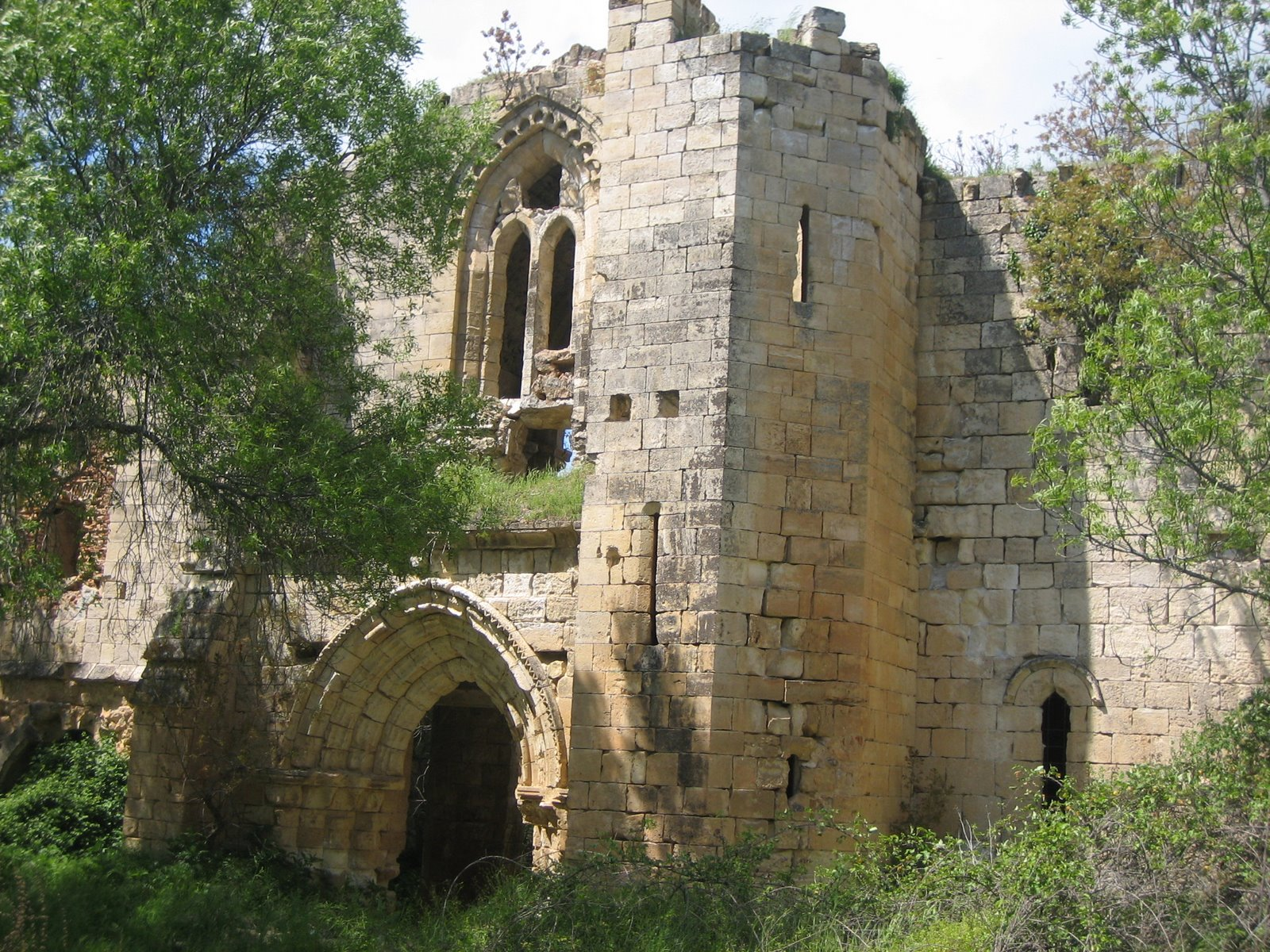
The Bonaval Monastery, a Cistercian monastery in the Jarama valley, which mixes romanesque and Gothic styles in its construction..

Castles in Alcorlo, Atienza, Beleña de Sorbe, Cogolludo, Riba de Santiuste and Sigüenza, as well as the Bujarrabal and Barbatona towers date back to the Andalusi period.

From the twelfth century onward, after the Castilian conquest, rural Romanesque style was developed throughout the region, abundant examples of which survive to date, though significantly transformed in the seventeenth century.

Atienza increased to fifteen churches, of which five of Romanesque origin remain today. Other examples of Romanesque present in the Pela highlands are the San Bartolome de Campisábalos church, the San Pedro de Villacadima church and the Santa Coloma de Albendiego hermitage, with its prominent apse.

In Sigüenza there are the San Vicente and Santiago churches. Other noteworthy churches in the rest of the region are the Salvador de Carabias church, the Pinilla de Jadraque Church of the Assumption, the Saúca church of the Assumption and the Beleña de Sorbe church of the Assumption. Also of note is the Bonaval Monastery, in the Jarama valley, near Retiendas, dating originally to 1162 and mixing Romanesque with Gothic.
