= Iglesia de Santiago, Sigüenza =

Church building in Sigüenza, Spain

Coordinates: 41.0662°N 2.6404°W

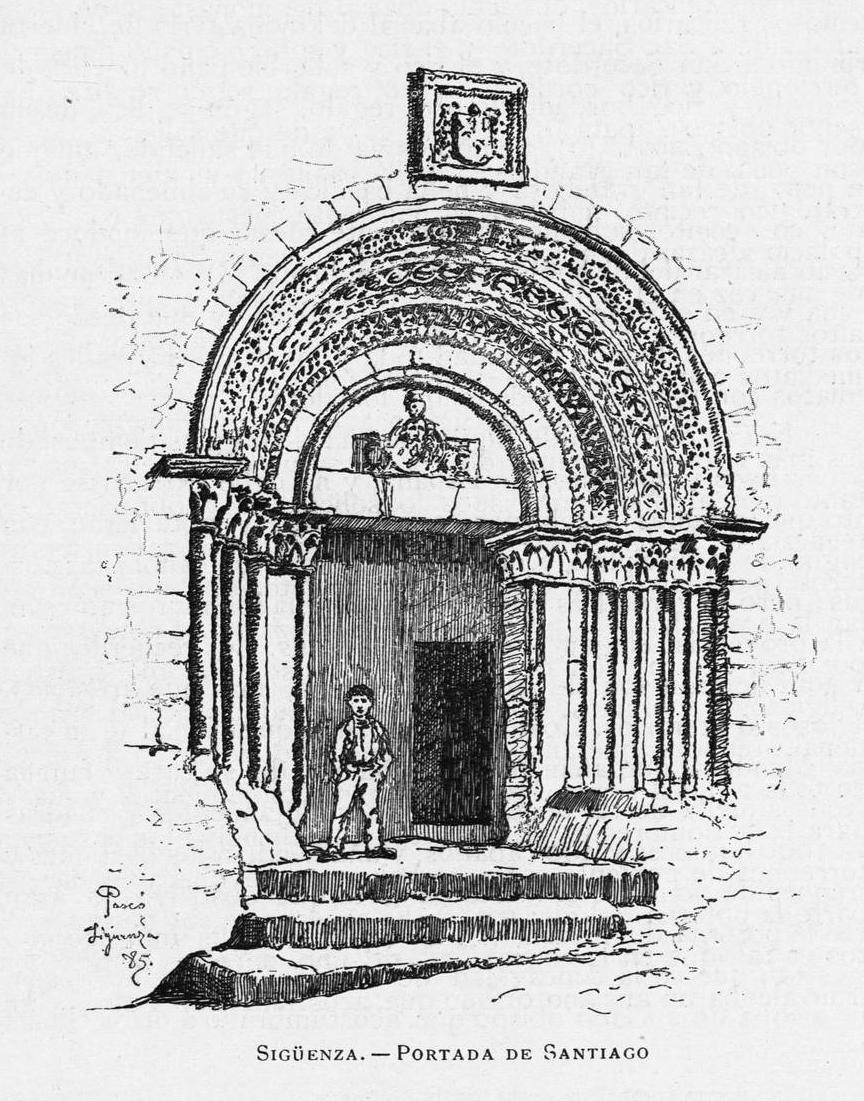
Church of Santiago (1885)

The Iglesia de Santiago (Church of St James) is a Romanesque church in the center of Sigüenza, in the autonomous community of Castilla-La Mancha, Spain.

Located on the Calle Mayor (main street), the façade recalls a Roman temple. It served as a parish church. The church was erected by Bishop Don Cerebruno (1156–1167). It consists of a single nave. It suffered damage during the Spanish Civil War and is still undergoing restoration. The church was once attached to a Clarissan monastery abandoned in the 1940s. The entrance portal has a bust of St James the Apostle, and traces of the coat of arms of the 16th-century Bishop Fadrique de Portugal.

== See also ==
- Catholic Church in Spain
