= Carabias, Guadalajara =

Coordinates: 41°5′28″N 2°43′0″W

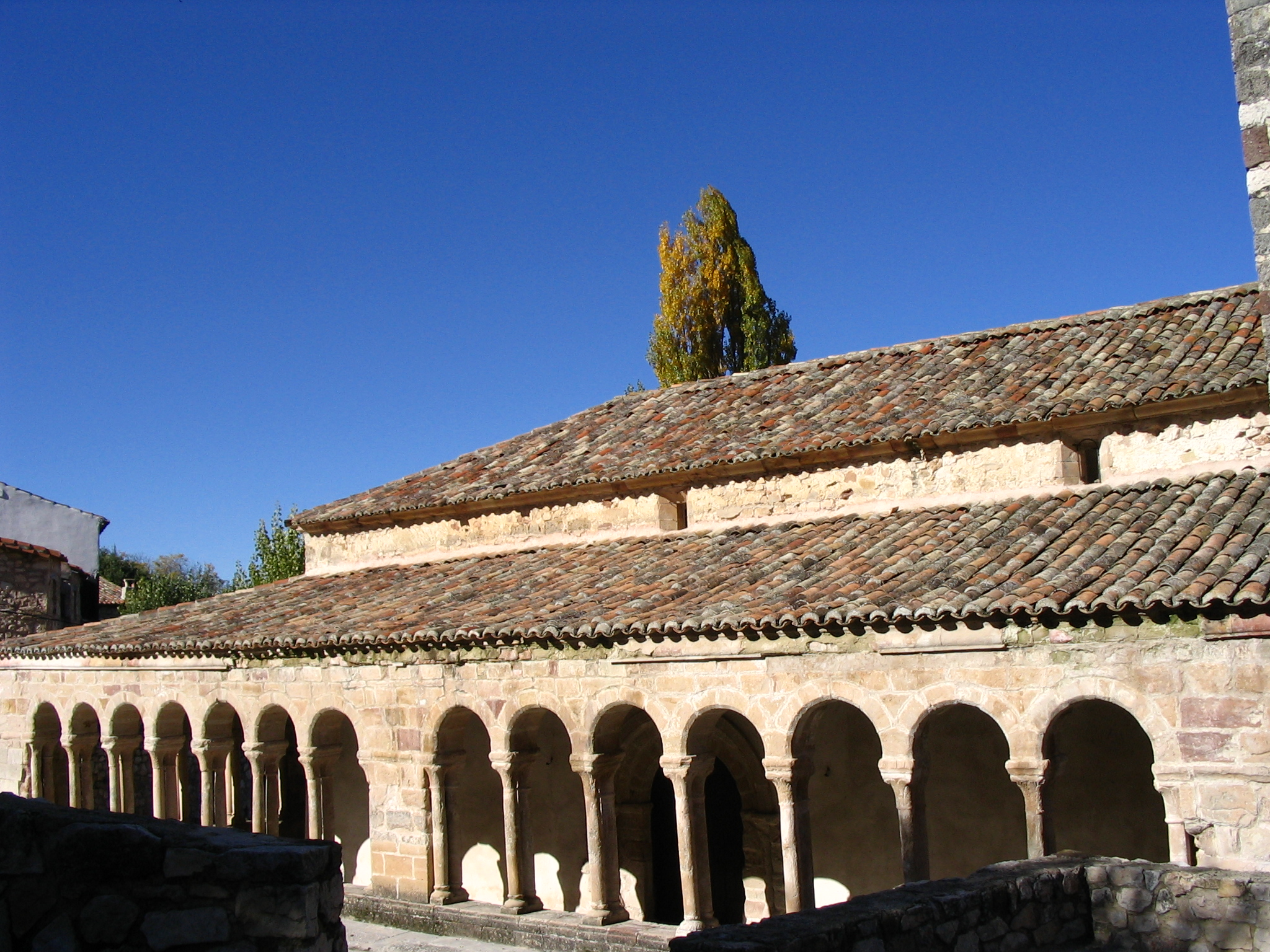
The Iglesia del Salvador.

Carabias is a village that belongs to the municipality of Sigüenza, in the province of Guadalajara in Castile–La Mancha, Spain. It has a fixed population of eight inhabitants, a number which increases substantially during holidays and weekends.

Amongst its most notable attractions are the Iglesia del Salvador, a church built in the romanic style, dating from the 18th century and the neoclassical fountain situated in front of the church.
