= Carabias, Segovia =

Carabias
- Municipality
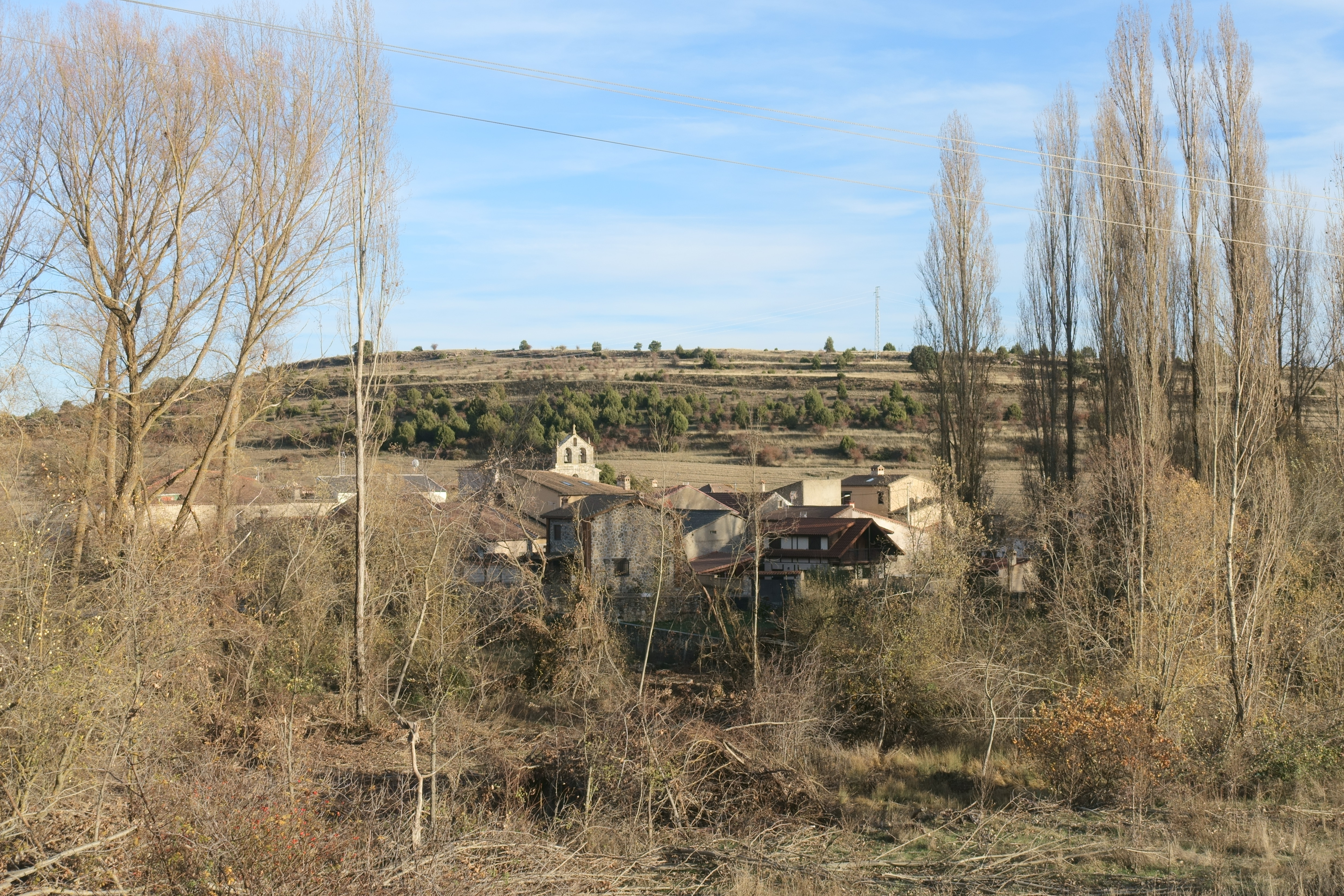
- General view of Carabias (Segovia, Spain).

- Location in Spain. Carabias (Spain)
- Coordinates: 41°26′31″N 3°40′23″W
- Country: Spain
- Autonomous community: Castile and León
- Province: Segovia
- Municipality: Carabias

Area
  - Total: 25 km^{2} (9.7 sq mi)

Population (2025-01-01)
  - Total: 55
  - Density: 2.2/km^{2} (5.7/sq mi)
- Time zone: UTC+1 (CET)
  - Summer (DST): UTC+2 (CEST)
- Website: Official website

Carabias, formerly known as Pradales, is a municipality located in the province of Segovia, Castile and León, Spain. According to the 2004 census (INE), the municipality has a population of 64 inhabitants.
