= Diego Fernández de Córdoba (died 1450) =

Castilian knight and nobleman

Diego Fernández de Córdoba (died November 1450) was a Castilian knight and nobleman. He was the lord of Chillón, Espejo and Lucena.

Diego was born in the final third of the 14th century, the first son of Martín I Fernández de Córdoba and his first wife, María Alfonso de Argote. He married Catalina de Sotomayor, daughter of Garcí Madruga, lord of El Carpio. They had three sons (Martín, Garcí, Diego) and three daughters (Inés, Isabel, María).

In 1421, during Henry of Aragon's revolt, Diego was entrusted by King John II to deliver a personal letter to Henry. In general, he sided with Álvaro de Luna against the disgruntled nobles. In 1431, he took part in Luna's campaign against Granada. He remained on Luna's side during the Castilian Civil War of 1437–1445 and was at the battle of Olmedo in 1445. In 1450, he signed an accord with his brothers Alfonso and Pedro, allowing him to inherit the office of alcaide of the donceles (royal pages). He died in November that year.
