= Diego Fernández de Córdoba (died 1435) =

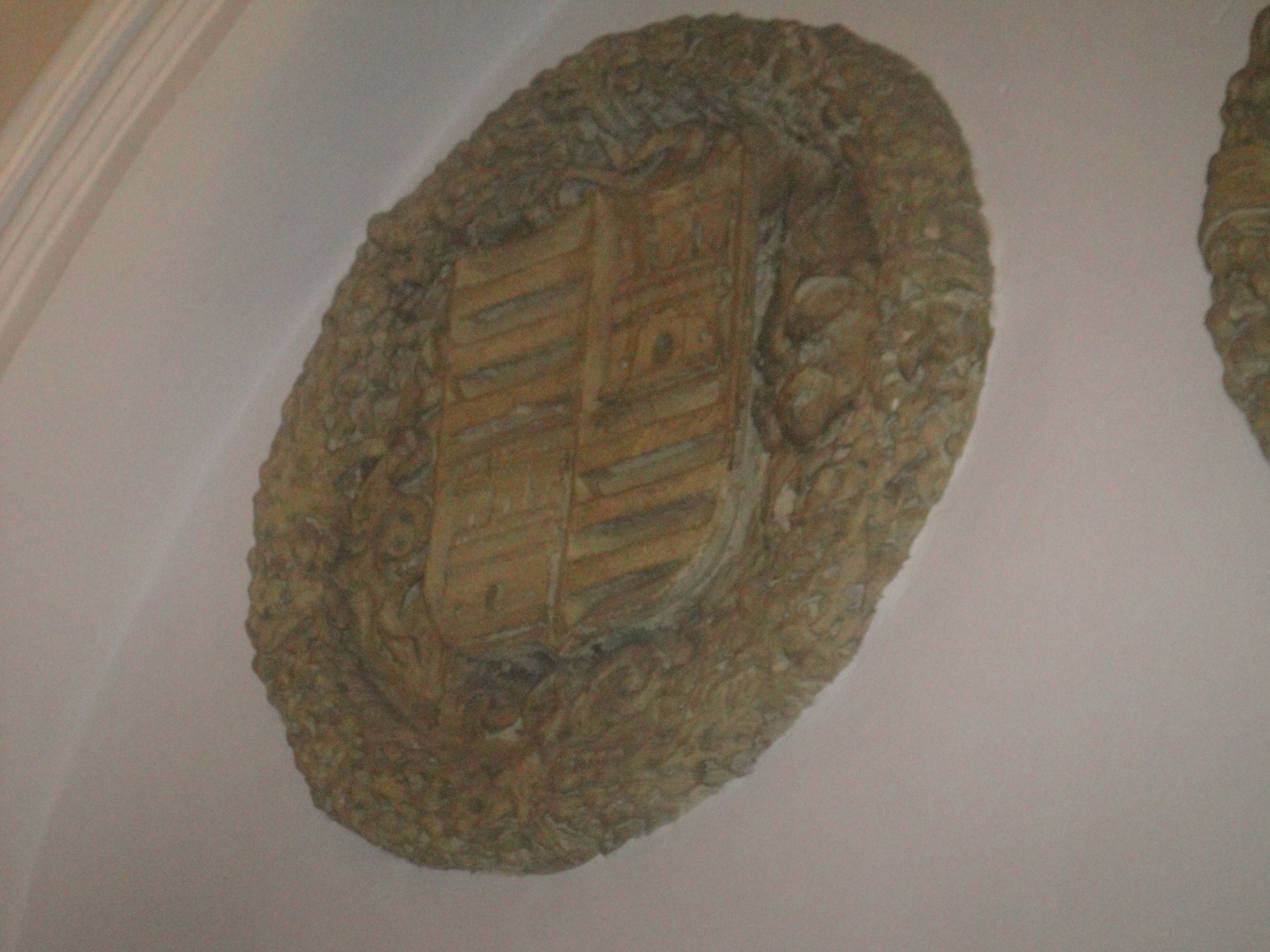
Diego's coat of arms as carved on his tomb

Diego Fernández de Córdoba (died November 1435) was a Castilian nobleman who served as the alguacil mayor of the Kingdom of Córdoba and as the first marshal of Castile.

Diego was the son of Gonzalo Fernández de Córdoba and María García. King John I (r. 1379–1390) appointed him the first marshal of the kingdom and in 1386 gave him the village of Baena. Henry III appointed him tutor to his son, the future John II (born 1405). In 1407, he took part in the siege of Setenil. In the spring of 1410, as alfaqueque mayor, he negotiated a truce with the Kingdom of Granada. Later that year, he took part in the conquest of Antequera under the regent Ferdinand. In 1431, he took part in Álvaro de Luna's campaign against Granada.

Diego's first wife was Sancha de Rojas, lady of Poza. From her inheritance he created a mayorazgo for his eldest son, Juan Rodríguez de Rojas. His second son, Pedro Fernández de Córdoba, was to receive the lordship of Baena as his mayorazgo, but he predeceased his father by two months. His third son, Sancho de Rojas, entered the church.
