= Church of San Ginés (Guadalajara) =

- Iglesia de San Ginés (Spanish)
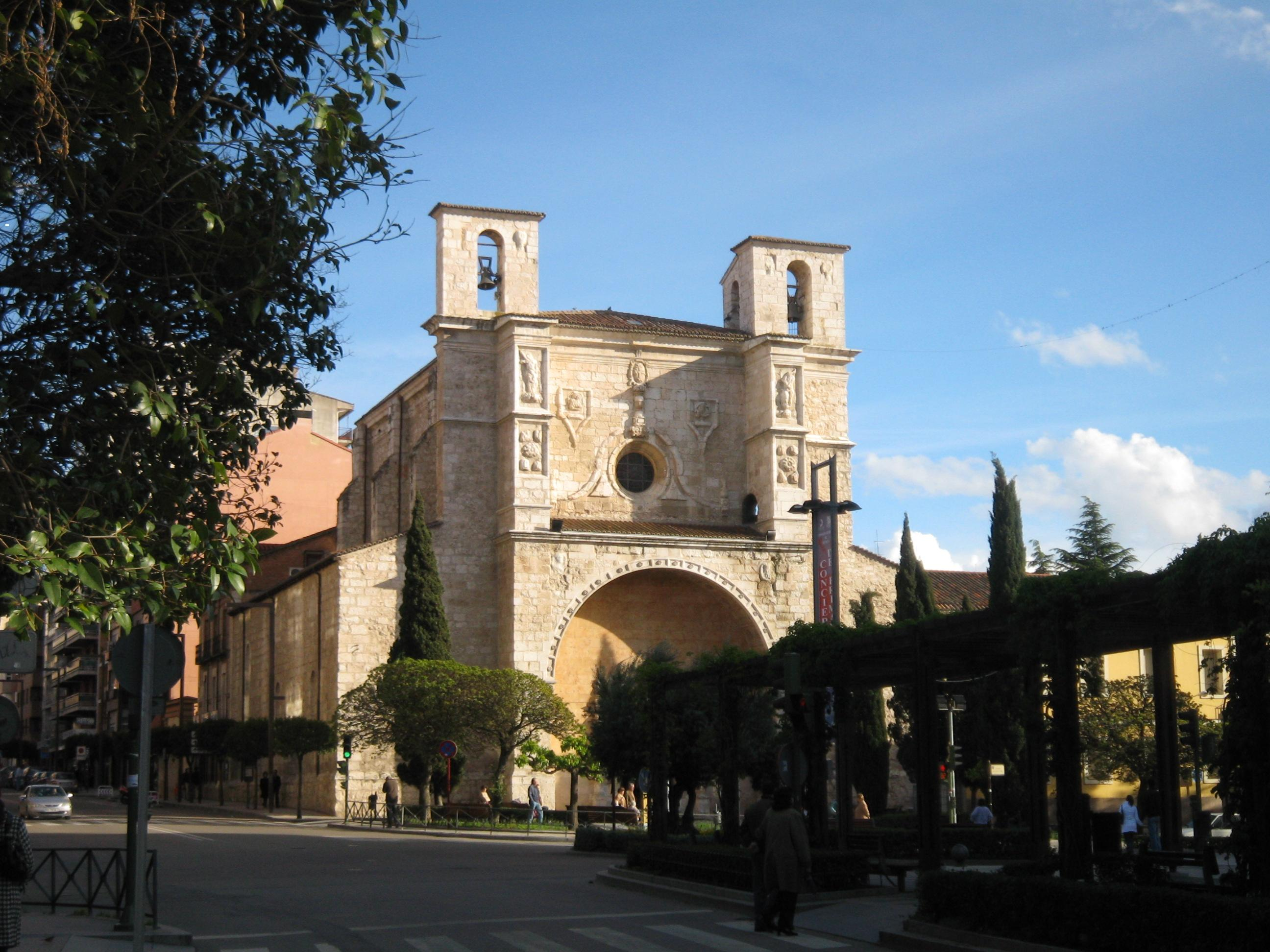

- Location within Spain
- 40.62989°N 3.164627°W
- Location: Guadalajara, Spain

Spanish Cultural Heritage
- Official name: Iglesia de San Ginés
- Type: Non-movable
- Criteria: Monument
- Designated: 1931
- Reference no.: RI-51-0000604

The Iglesia de San Ginés (Spanish: Iglesia de San Ginés) is a church located in Guadalajara, Spain. It was declared Bien de Interés Cultural in 1931.
