= Doncel =

Court pages in medieval Spain

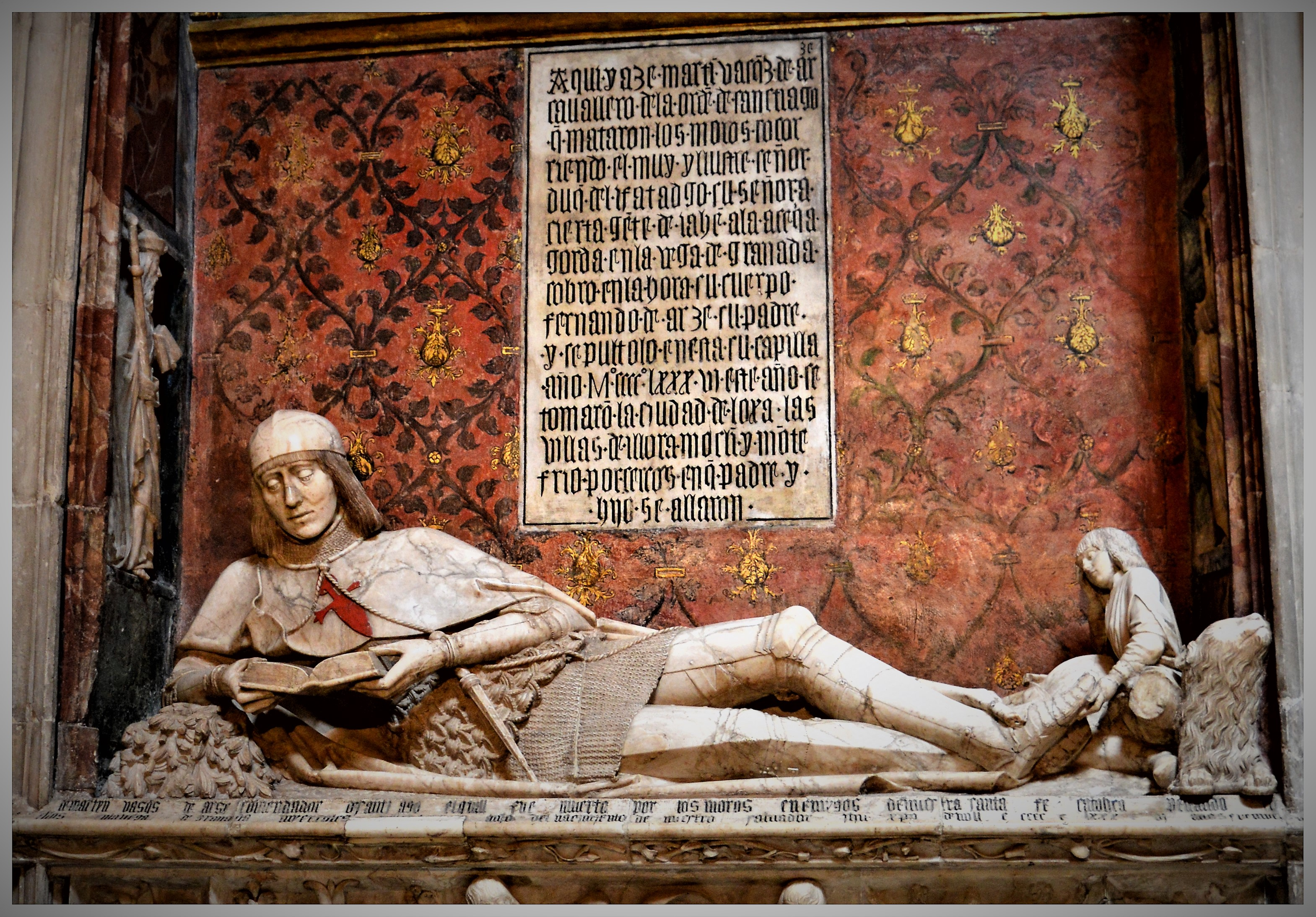
El Doncel de Sigüenza, a statue depicting a young knight

Doncel was a court appointment in the Crowns of Castile and Aragon during the Late Middle Ages. It was bestowed upon youth from noble families, prior to knighthood. Donceles worked alongside other pajes reales (royal pages) as royal servants and received training by the Alcaide de los Donceles. One of the most famous donceles was Martín Vázquez de Arce, who was page to Diego Hurtado de Mendoza, 1st Duke of the Infantado and died during the Granada War.

Donceles lived in the Royal household during their adolescence. In the court of Peter IV of Aragon in 1356 there were 110 donceles of noble origin (Aragonese, Catalan and Valencian). In the Crown of Castile there were both noble donceles and other pajes and criados who were often not noble. Both pajes and donceles received military training by the Alcaide de los Donceles, a post created by Alfonso XI of Castile around 1340. Known alcaides include Martín I Fernández de Córdoba, Diego Fernández de Córdoba and Martín II Fernández de Córdoba.

In the times of the Reyes Católicos, this kind of royal servant was known as contino, thus named because of their continuous availability. Their tasks were varied, mostly administrative, and they received a fixed salary.
