= Sigüenza =

- Municipality
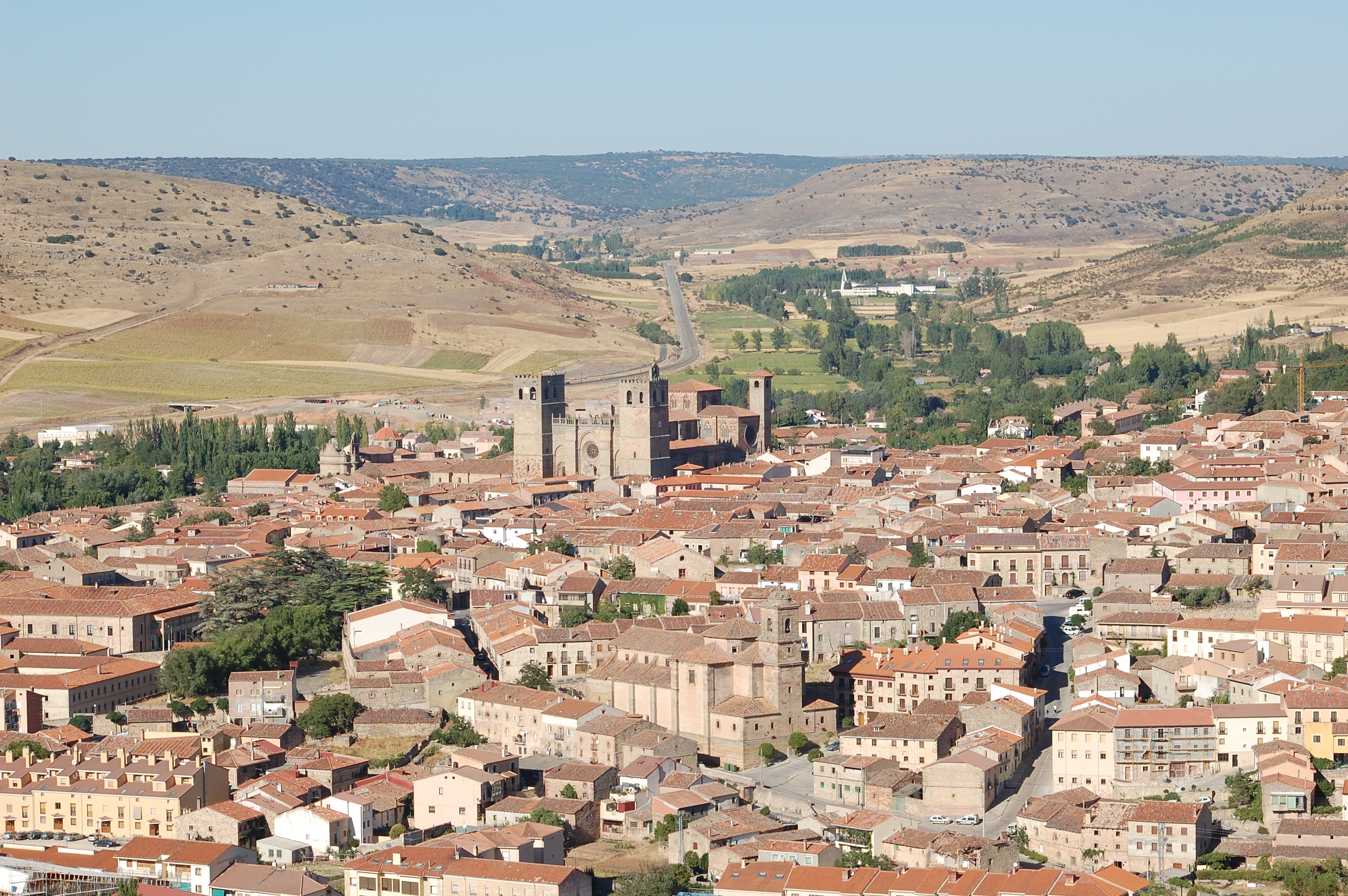

- Flag Coat of arms

- Location within Castilla-La Mancha Location within Spain
- Coordinates: 41°04′09″N 2°38′21″W
- Country: Spain
- Autonomous Community: Castile-La Mancha
- Province: Guadalajara
- Comarca: Serranía de Guadalajara
- Towns (pedanías): List: Alboreca; Alcuneza; El Atance; Barbatona; La Barbolla; Bujalcayado; Bujarrabal; La Cabrera; Carabias; Cercadillo; Cubillas del Pinar; Guijosa; Horna; Imón; Matas; Mojares; Moratilla de Henares; Olmedillas; Querencia; Palazuelos; Pelegrina; Pozancos; Riba de Santiuste; Riosalido; Sigüenza; Torre de Valdealmendras; Ures; Valdealmendras; Villacorza

Government
  - Type: Mayor-council government
  - Body: Ayuntamiento de Sigüenza
  - Mayor: María Jesús Merino Poyo (2023) (PSOE)

Area
  - Total: 386.87 km^{2} (149.37 sq mi)
- Elevation: 1,004 m (3,294 ft)

Population (2025-01-01)
  - Total: 4,911
  - Density: 12.69/km^{2} (32.88/sq mi)
- Demonym(s): seguntino, -na; (es)
- Time zone: CET (GMT +1)
  - Summer (DST): CEST (GMT +2)
- Postcode: 19250

Spanish Cultural Heritage
- Type: Non-movable
- Criteria: Historic ensemble
- Designated: 20 May 1965
- Reference no.: RI-53-0000059

Sigüenza (Spanish: [siˈɣwenθa]) is a city in the Serranía de Guadalajara comarca, Province of Guadalajara, Castile-La Mancha, Spain.

== History ==
The site of the ancient Segontia ('dominating over the valley') of the Celtiberian Arevaci, now called Villavieja ('old town'), is half a league distant from the present Sigüenza. Livy mentions the town in his discussion of the wars of Cato the Elder with the Celtiberians.

The city fell under Roman, Visigothic, Moorish and Castilian rule.

Around 1123 it was taken by Bernard of Agen, its first bishop. Sigüenza played a large part in the civil wars of the thirteenth and fourteenth centuries. The fortress palace of the bishops, originally an earlier Moorish qasbah, was captured in 1297 by the partisans of the Infantes de la Cerda, and in 1355 it was the prison of Blanche of Bourbon, consort of Peter of Castile. In 1465 Diego López of Madrid, having usurped the miter, fortified himself there.

The last bishop-lord, known as the "mason-bishop", built a neighborhood below the level of the old town in a Neo-Classical style, before renouncing the temporal lordship.

During the Spanish Civil War, the Francoist Civil Guard fortified the upper castle, while the Republican forces took to the lower cathedral.

After the war, the city limits have increased with the incorporation of 28 pedanías (villages).

A Jewish community once existed in Sigüenza from 1124-1492 (1124 was the first written documentation, but the presence of Jews most likely already existed). Cardinal Jiménez de Cisneros learned Hebrew during his stay in Sigüenza.

== Main sights ==
=== Cathedral ===
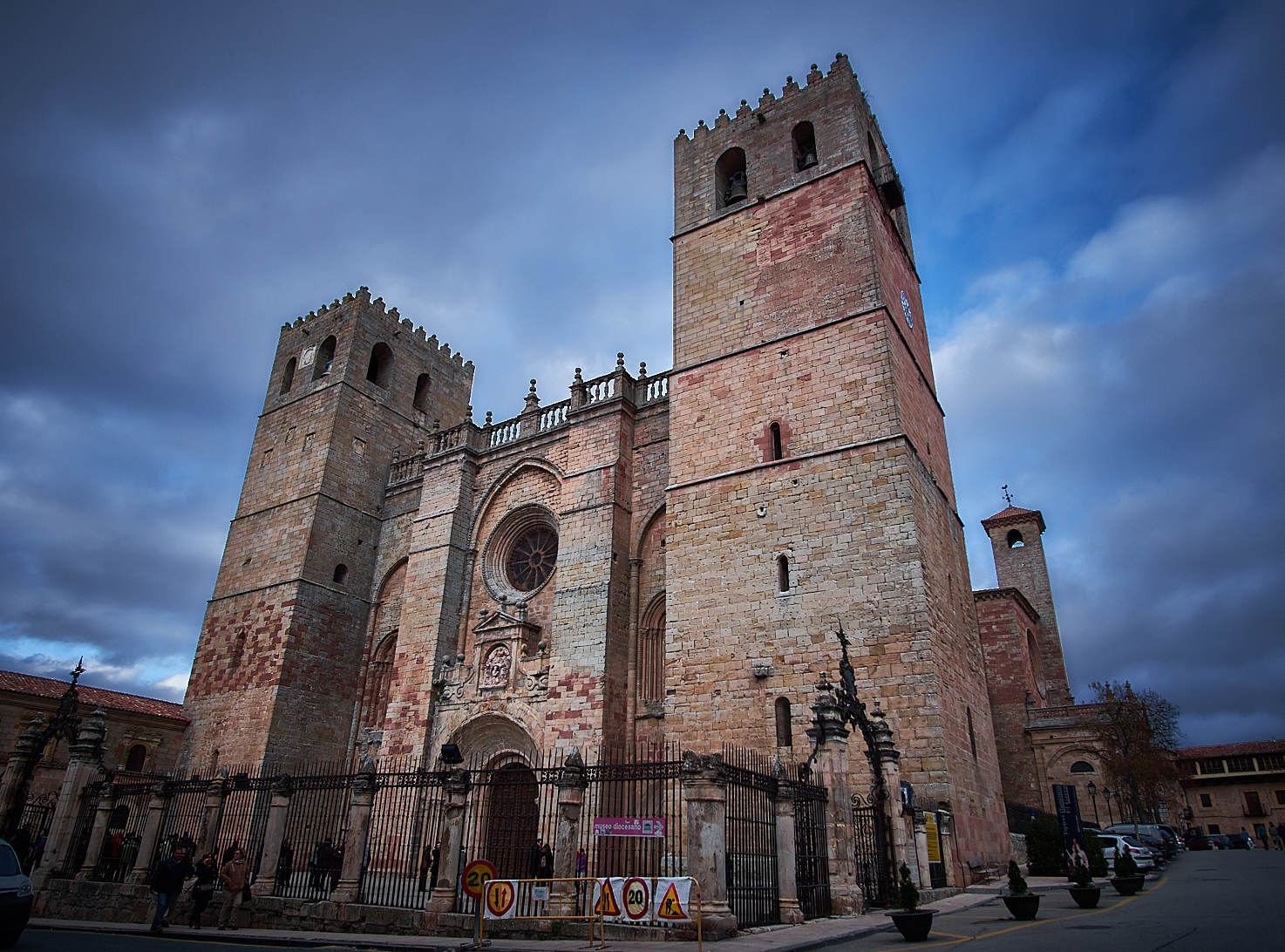
Cathedral of Sigüenza.

The cathedral is a large Gothic edifice of ashlar stone, though the lower levels show that it was built onto an earlier Romanesque cathedral. Its façade has three doors, with a railed court in front. At the sides rise two square towers, 164 feet high, built at different times, with merlons topped with large balls; these towers are connected by a balustrade which crowns the facade, the work of Bishop Herrera in the eighteenth century. The interior is divided into a nave and two aisles, in Gothic style.

The main choir begins in the transept with a Renaissance altar built by order of Bishop Mateo de Burgos. In the transept is the Chapel of Saint Liberata (Librada), the female patron saint of the city, with a reredos and the relics of the saint, all constructed at the expense of Bishop Fadrique of Portugal, who is buried there.

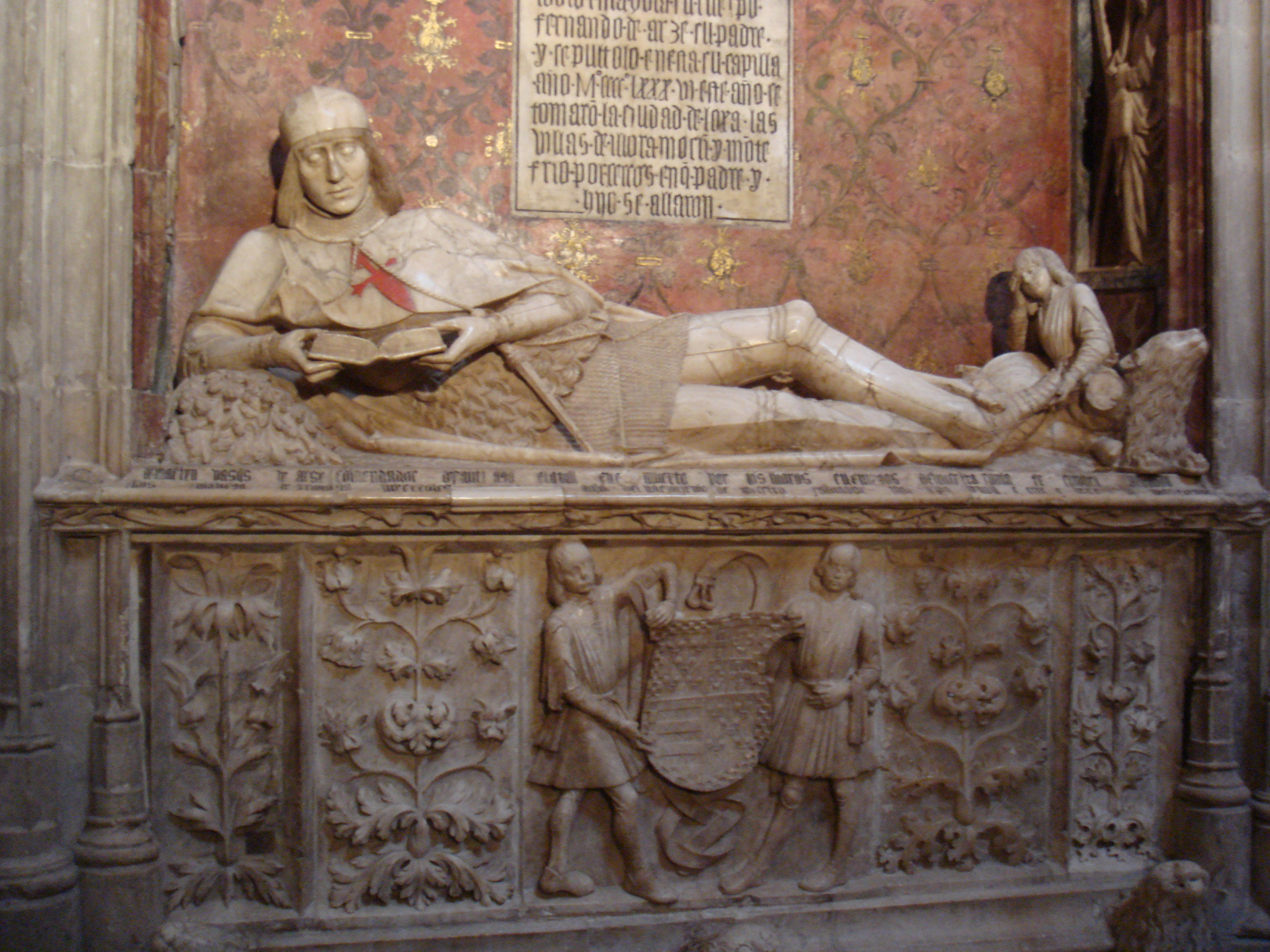
The sepulchre of Martín Vázquez de Arce, with the doncel de Sigüenza

What is now the Chapel of St. Catherine was dedicated to St. Thomas of Canterbury by the English Bishop Jocelin. The chapel houses the sepulchre of Martín Vázquez de Arce (Martin Vasques de Arze in the spelling of the time). Vázquez died in 1486 during the conquest of Granada and his brother Fernando, bishop of the Canary Islands, ordered a portrait in alabaster where he lies on his side while reading, in one of the finest examples of Spanish funerary art. It contrasts with the recumbent figures of his parents in the same chapel.

The authors of the Spanish Generation of 1898 (Ortega y Gasset) drew attention to this statue naming him el doncel de Sigüenza, 'the doncel (royal page) of Sigüenza', but Vázquez left a widow and children. Cardinal Mendoza is interred in the main choir. Beyond the choir proper, which is situated in the centre, there is the altar of Nuestra Señora la Mayor, in black marble from Calatorao and red marble, featuring spiral Solomonic columns.

The main sacristy is also named as "of the heads". It was designed in 1532 by Alonso de Covarrubias and built by Francisco de Baeza and Martín de Vandoma. The portal is Renaissance, Plateresque, of 1573, in stone, the nut tree door has also Plateresque carvings and was damaged by a cat door and the Napoleonic troops. The half cannon vault features 304 big heads, all different, and 2000 smaller ones, hence the nickname of the room.

The cathedral's ceiling and stained glass were damaged in the Spanish Civil War, with the reconstruction ending in 1947.

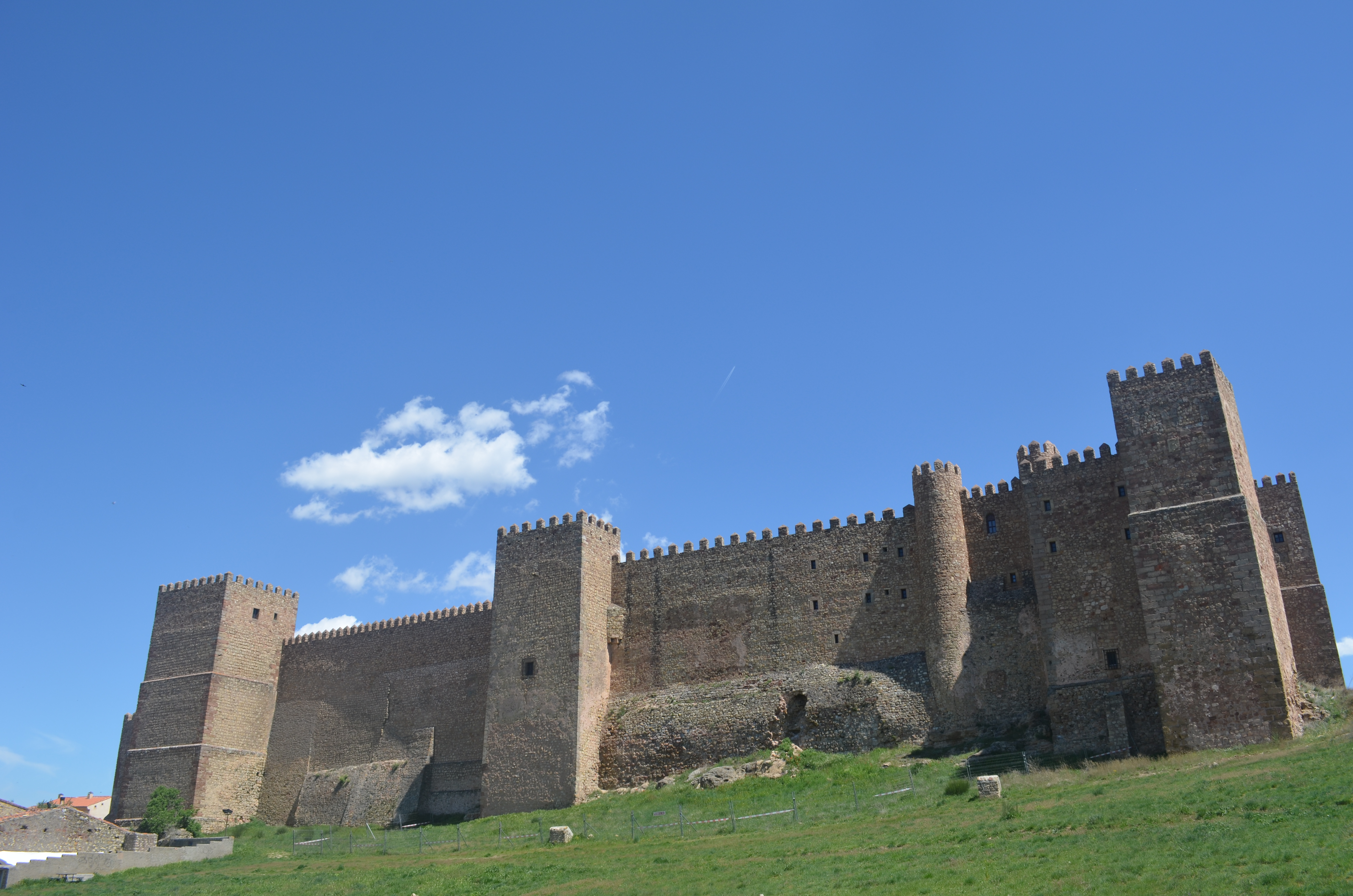
The medieval castle.

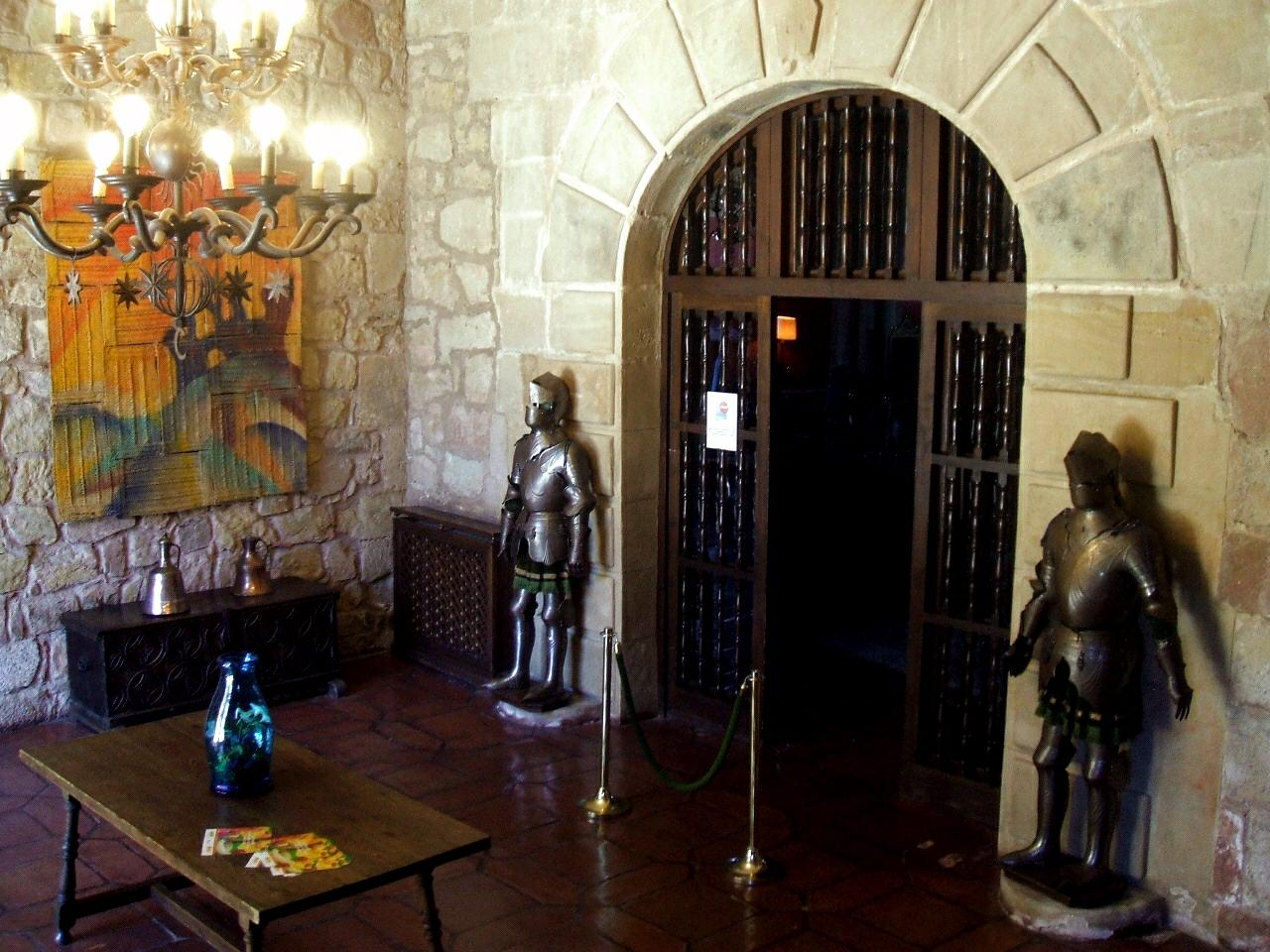
Interior of the castle.

Connected with the cathedral is a Florid Gothic cloister, the work of Bernardino de Carvajal. The rich tabernacle, with its golden monstrance, was given by Cardinal Mendoza. The chapter house contains a number of paintings. It is not known with any certainty at what period this church was begun, though it appears to date from the end of the twelfth century. The image of Nuestra Señora la Mayor, to whom the church is dedicated, dates from the end of the twelfth century; it was taken to the retro-choir in the fifteenth century, the Assumption being substituted for it on the high altar.

=== Castle ===
With foundations dating back to the 5th century, Sigüenza Castle was extended by the Moors in the 8th century and retaken by the Christians under Bernard of Agen in 1123. In the late 18th century, Bishop Juan Díaz de la Guerra changed the appearance of the castle from a fortress into an episcopal palace with additional windows, balconies and stables. However, in 1808 during the War of Spanish Independence the castle was taken by the French who seriously damaged it and looted all its riches before it was recaptured by El Empecinado. The episcopal palace was further devastated by fire in the 1830s and had to be abandoned. In 1976, after comprehensive restoration, the castle was opened as a Parador luxury hotel. The official inauguration took place in 1978 with the visit of King King Juan Carlos and Queen Sofía. Decorated with banners and suits of armour, the huge lounge was originally the castle's dining room.

=== Other buildings ===
The Conciliar Seminary of San Bartolomé is the work of Bishop Bartolomé Santos de Risoba (1651). There is a smaller seminary, that of the Immaculate Conception, and a college. The College of San Antonio el Grande was formerly a university (see below), founded in 1476 by the wealthy Juan López de Medina, archdeacon of Almazán, but its prosperity was hindered by the foundation of the University of Alcalá; in 1770 it was reduced to a few chairs of philosophy and theology, until it was suppressed in 1837.

Other buildings include the 12th century Church of St James (Iglesia de Santiago); the ancient hermitage of Nuestra Señora, which according to tradition was originally the pro-cathedral; the Nuestra Señora de los Huertos monastery; the Humilladero, a small Gothic hermitage, now a tourism office; the Churrigueresque convent of the Franciscans; the modern convent of the Ursulines, which was formerly the home of the choir boys; the hospital of the military barracks; and the Hieronymite college.

== University of Sigüenza ==
The building of the College of San Antonio Portaceli of Sigüenza, Spain, which was later transformed into a university, was begun in 1476. Its founder was Don Juan López de Medina, archdeacon of Almazán, canon of Toledo and vicar-general of Sigüenza. The papal bull ratifying the foundation, approving the benefices, etc., was granted by Sixtus IV in 1483, and courses were opened in theology, canon law and the liberal arts. By a bull of Innocent VIII in 1489, the university was created, with powers to confer the degrees of bachelor, licentiate and doctor; the college was thus transformed into a university. A bull issued by Pope Paul III extended the course in theology, and during the rectorate of Maestro Velosillo the chairs of physics were created, while a bull of Pope Julius II established the faculties of secular law and of medicine.

Among the professors were the mathematician and theologian Pedro Ciruelo, who enhanced the prestige of the university as a center of learning; Don Francisco Delgado, Bishop of Lugo and rector, under whom the university reached its period of greatest splendor; Don Fernando Velosillo, rector and professor, who was sent by king Philip II of Spain to the Council of Trent; also present at that council were, as theologians, Don Antonio Torres, first Bishop of the Canary Islands, and Señor Torro, both professors of this university; Don Pedro Guerrero, Archbishop of Granada; the famous Cuesta; Tricio and Francisco Álvarez, Bishop of Sigüenza. Thus evidently the influence of the University of Sigüenza in the Spanish Catholic church and kingdom was considerable in the last years of the fifteenth century and the first years of the sixteenth; thereafter it fell into decay. It was suppressed in 1837.

The university is mentioned in Miguel de Cervantes' novel Don Quixote: "Often he had arguments with the priest of his village, who was a scholar and a graduate of Siguenza ..."

== Twin towns ==
- Sainte-Livrade-sur-Lot, France
- Vila Viçosa, Portugal

== See also ==
- Bishopric of Siguenza
