= List of Spanish inventions and discoveries =

The following list is composed of items, techniques and processes that were invented by or discovered by people from Spain.

Spain was an important center of knowledge during the medieval era. While most of western and southern Europe suffered from the collapse of the Roman Empire, although declining, some regions of the former empire, Hispania, southern Italy, and the remainder of the Eastern Roman Empire or Byzantine Empire, did not to suffer from the full impact of the so-called Dark Ages when education collapsed with the collapse of the empire and most knowledge was lost. The Islamic conquests of places such as Egypt, which was a major part of the Byzantine Empire, and other places which were centers of knowledge in earlier times, gave the Muslims access to knowledge from many cultures which they translated into Arabic and recorded in books for the use of their own educated elites, who flourished in this period, and took with them to the Hispania after it fell under Muslim control. Much of this knowledge was later translated by Christian and Jewish scholars in the Christian kingdoms of the Reconquista from Arabic into Latin, and from there it spread through Europe.

== Inventions and discoveries from the Golden Age of Al Andalus ==
- Mercuric oxide, first synthesized by Abu al-Qasim al-Qurtubi al-Majriti (10th century).
- Water and weight driven mechanical clocks, by Spanish Muslim engineers sometime between 900–1200 AD. According to historian Will Durant, a watch like device was invented by Ibn Firnas.
- Inheritance of traits first proposed by Abu Al-Zahrawi (936–1013 AD) more than 800 years before Austrian monk, Mendel. Al-Zahrawi was first to record and suggest that hemophilia was an inherited disease.
- Spherical Trigonometry - work of Abū Abd Allāh Muḥammad ibn Muʿādh al-Jayyānī (989–1079 AD). Greatly influenced Western mathematics, including the works of Regiomontanus.
- Animal Testing, first recorded use of animals for medical testing was done by Ibn Zuhr, known as Avenzoar, (1094–1162).
- Inhalation anesthesia, invented by al-Zahrawi and Ibn Zuhr. Used a sponge soaked with narcotic drugs to be inhalated by the patient.
- Eye glasses, first invented by Ibn Firnas in the 9th century.
- Modern surgery. Abu al-Qasim al-Zahrawi (936–1013 AD), better known in the west as Albucasis, is regarded as the father of modern surgery and is the most quoted surgeon of all times. Albucasis invented over 200 tools for use in surgery - many still in use today.
- Migraine surgery, first performed by al-Zahrawi (936–1013 AD).
- Ectopic pregnancy, first described by Al-Zahrawi (936–1013 AD).
- Pharmacopoeia (book of medicine). During the 14th century, the physician from Malaga, Ibn Baytar, wrote a pharmacopoeia naming over 1400 different drugs and their uses in medicine. This book was written 200 years before the supposed first pharmacopoeia was written by German scholar in 1542.
- First process of creating artificial crystals by Ibn Firnas.
- Oscillation theory of the obliquity of the ecliptic by Abū Isḥāq Ibrāhīm ibn Yaḥyā al-Naqqāsh al-Zarqālī, also known as Al-Zarqali or Ibn Zarqala (1029–1087).
- Averroism - the school of philosophy founded by Al-Andalus philosopher Averroes. Averroes in one of the most quoted men of the medieval era and has greatly influenced Western Europe.
- Equatorium by Ibn al-Samh.

== Animation ==
- M-Tecnofantasy - is an animation technique, created by Francisco Macián Blasco, that animators use to trace over motion picture footage, frame by frame, to produce realistic action similar to rotoscopy.

== Architecture and construction ==
- Azulejo
- Calatrava style - The futuristic style of architecture invented and designed by world renown Spanish architect, Santiago Calatrava. Examples include the City of Arts and Sciences in Valencia, the planned Chicago Spire, Puente del Alamillo, in Seville, and the new World Trade Center Transportation Hub at rebuilt New World Trade Center site in New York City.
- Catalan Gothic
- Catalan Modernisme - a very influential style of architecture used not only in Catalonia but throughout Spain. Its greatest pioneer was the most famous architect Antoni Gaudí and his masterpiece, La Sagrada Familia.
- Hacienda
- Herrerian
- Horseshoe arch was first used in Visigothic Spain.
- Isabelline Gothic
- Valencian Gothic
- Valencian Art Nouveau
- Levantine Gothic
- Masia
- Mozarabic
- Mudéjar style
- Neo-Mudéjar
- Palloza
- Pazo
- Plateresque
- Purism architecture
- Repoblación
- Spanish Colonial Architecture
- Spanish Tile
- Visigothic

== Chemistry ==
- Pure alcohol distillation
- Modern toxicology, by Mathieu Orfila (1787–1853).
- Discovery of vanadium (as vanadinite) in 1801 by geologist and chemist Andrés Manuel del Río (1764–1849)
- Discovery of tungsten by Fausto Elhuyar and his brother Juan José Elhuyar in 1783.
- Discovery of platinum by scientist, soldier and author Antonio de Ulloa (1716–1795) with Jorge Juan y Santacilia (1713–1773).
- Discovery of carbon monoxide and pure alcohol by alchemist and physician Arnold of Villanova (c. 1235–1311)

== Computing and Communications ==
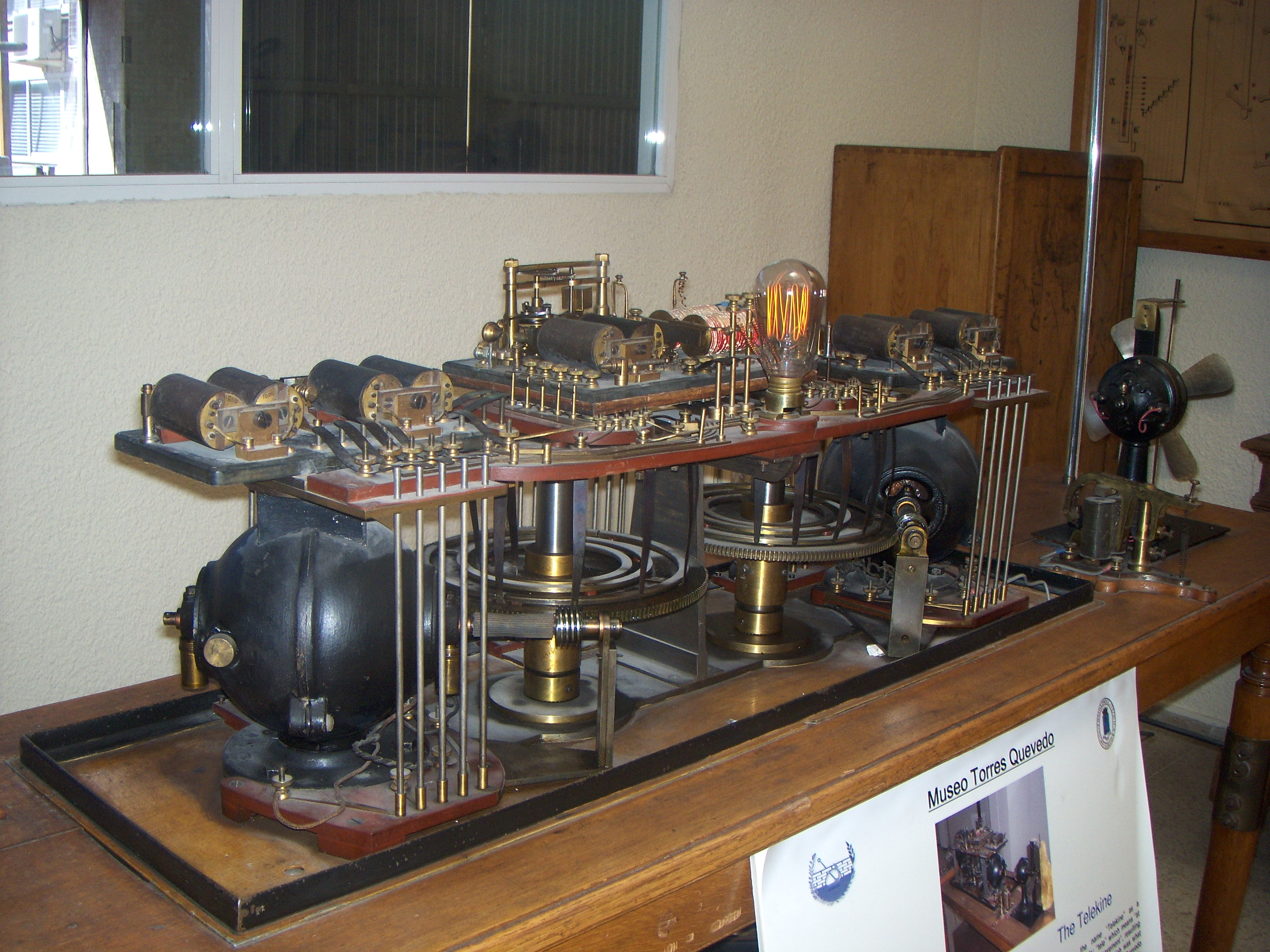
The Telekino, invented by Leonardo Torres Quevedo in 1903, consisted of a robot that executed commands transmitted by electromagnetic waves.

- Telekino, pioneering of remote control, by engineer and computer pioneer Leonardo Torres Quevedo (1852–1936)
- Electronic book by teacher, writer and inventor Ángela Ruiz Robles (1895-1975).

== Cuisine ==
- Sweet chocolate - the Mesoamericans drank chocolate strait bitter and sometimes flavored with spicy peppers. Spanish conquistadors were not fans of the original mix and instead created their own sweeten hot chocolate by adding sugar from sugar cane. For many years, the Spanish kept their prized chocolate a secret until its expansion into other European courts.
- Chorizo
- Jamón ibérico
- Spanish omelette
- Jerez - also known as Sherry
- Paella
- Spanish cuisine

== Economics ==
- Development of the first monetarist theory and the quantitative theory of money by economist Martín de Azpilcueta (1492–1586), member of the School of Salamanca.
- Precursor of international law theory by Francisco de Vitoria (c. 1480/86 – 1546), member of the School of Salamanca.
- First registered use of paper currency.

== Fashion ==
Spain has been a center of fashion since medieval times. Barcelona and Madrid have both been named as fashion capitals of the world, with Barcelona being the fifth most important fashion capital in the world back in 2015. Spain is the home country of the largest fashion retail store and textiles designer in the world, Zara and its parent Inditex, making their CEO main shareholder, Amancio Ortega Gaona, the second wealthiest man in the world in 2015. Barcelona is the headquarters of another international retail company, Mango.

Inventions:

- Farthingale
- Spray-on-clothing by Manel Torres

== Mathematics and statistics ==
- Borda Count - by Ramon Llull, around 1299, centuries before Jean-Charles de Borda.
- Condorcet criterion - by Ramon Llull, around 1299, centuries before Nicolas de Condorcet.
- Contributions to the field of Dynamical Systems by Ricardo Pérez-Marco
- Nualart stochastic processes and stochastic analysis (field of probability theory).
- Speculative Arithmetic
- Gregorian calendar - reforms from the Julian calendar to the Gregorian calendar by Spanish mathematician, Pedro Chacón.
- Geostatistical Analysis of Compositional Data by Vera Pawlowsky-Glahn and Ricardo A. Olea.
- Group Theory and Lie algebras works done by Maria Wonenburger (1927–2014).
- Integral geometry by Luís Antoni Santaló Sors
- Modelling and Analysis of Compositional Data by Vera Pawlowsky-Glahn, Juan José Egozcue, Raimon Tolosana-Delgado
- Nonlinear partial differential equations and their applications by Juan Luis Vázquez Suárez
- Tirocinio aritmético by María Andrea Casamayor (1700–1780).
- Works of Enrique Zuazua in applied mathematics in the fields of partial differential equations, control theory and numerical analysis.

== Medicine and biology ==
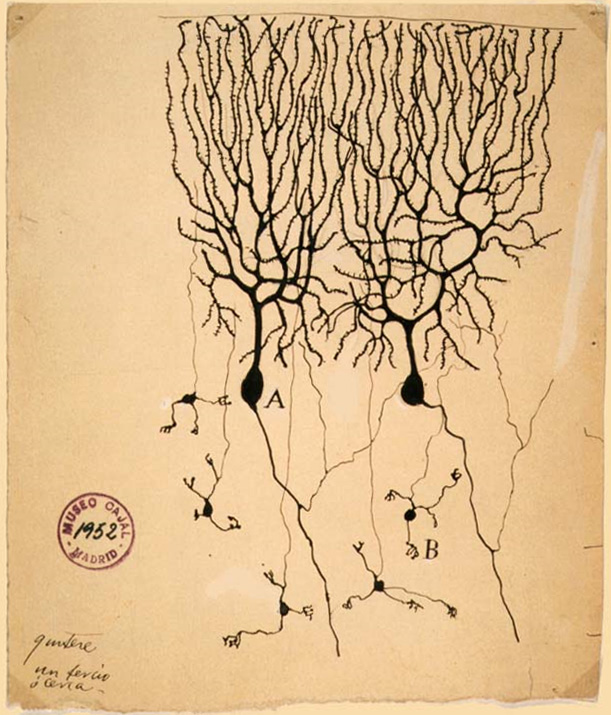
Drawing by Santiago Ramón y Cajal (1899) of neurons in the pigeon cerebellum

- Synthesis of ribonucleic acid (RNA) by Nobel prize Laureate Severo Ochoa (1905–1993).
- Neuroscience by Nobel prize Laureate (1906) Santiago Ramón y Cajal (1852–1934).
- Discovery of the microglia or Hortega cell by the neuroscientist Pío del Río Hortega (1882–1945)
- Discovery that the human cell has 46 chromosomes - jointly discovered with a Swedish scientist.
- Discovery that the parasitic agent of Chagas disease, Trypanosoma cruzi, reproduce by cloning - discovered by Francisco J. Ayala.
- The effect of hormone levels on the mind - crucial to forming a relationship between psychology and endocrinology, by Gregorio Marañón.
- First European description of pulmonary circulation by scientist, surgeon and humanist Miguel Servet (1511–1553)
- A worldwide used "two-piece" disposable syringe (1978) by Manuel Jalón Corominas (1925–2011)
- Use of Radiology and Radiotherapy for diagnostics by Celedonio Calatayud (1880-1931).
- Antiseptics were in used as early as the 10th century in hospitals in Islamic Spain. Special protocols, in Al Andalus, were used to keep hygiene before and after surgery.
- Botany, Spanish botanist, like Ibn al-Baitar, created hundreds of works/catalogs on the various plants in not only Europe but the Middle East, Africa and Asia. In these works many processes for extracting essential oils, drugs as well as their uses can be found.
- The CRISPR System, discovered by Francisco Mojica, from the University of Alicante.
- Epidural anesthesia discovered by Fidel Pagés Miravé, in 1921.
- Laryngoscope by singer, music educator, and vocal pedagogue Manuel García (1805–1906).
- Ligatures, described in the work of Al-Zahrawi (936–1013 AD), Kitab al-Tasrif, one of the most influential books in early modern medicine. Describes the process of performing a ligature on blood vessels.
- Nuubo - Wearable medical technology that measures heart rate, blood pressure, perspiration, body temperature and current location.
- Silver bromide method.
- Wheelchair - first European design for the use of the most powerful man in the world at the time, King Phillip II of Spain, who was suffering from gout.
- Yellow Fever Transmission - Luis Alvarez, born in Havana, Cuba (then Kingdom of Spain) was first to discover that Yellow Fever was transmitted through mosquitoes Aedes aegypti.

== Meteorology ==
- The barocyclonometer, the nephoscope, and the microseismograph by meteorologist José María Algué (1856–1930).

== Military ==
- First amphibious landing of tanks at Alhucemas bay in 1925 and a precursor of Allied amphibious operations in World War II.
- Destructor - The main precursor of the destroyer type of warship, laid down in 1885.
- Training of aggressive dogs for warfare.
- Falcata swords used by Iberian tribes.
- Gladius Hispanensis (antennae swords) - Swords adopted by the Romans after the second Punic war. The Iberian sword was considered superior to that of the Romans.
- Guerrilla warfare developed in Spain during the Napoleonic invasion of the Iberian peninsula.
- Miquelet lock was invented by gunsmiths in Madrid during the late 16th century (circa 1570). In Spain it was initially known as patilla (little leg) and in the rest of Europe as the "Spanish lock".
- Molotov cocktails were first developed in Spain during the Spanish civil war and were ordered to be used by the Nationalist forces against Soviet T-26 tanks supporting the Spanish Republic.
- Peral Submarine, design of the first fully operative military submarine by Isaac Peral (1851–1895).
- First professional army in Europe, the Tercios – men were hired and trained in Spain to join the army as their professional job not as some levy or through hiring mercenaries.
- Rapier - Spain was the first European country to use rapiers.
- First use of a rotorcraft in combat, during the suppression of the Asturias Rebellion in 1934.
- Tercios greatly modernized fighting in Europe. It is seen by military historians as one of the great developments of combined arms and tactics for warfare. The Spanish Tercios were undefeated in every war until Battle of Rocroi in 1643 and were greatly feared as an invincible army.
- Toledo steel - The Iberian region has been known for high quality metal working and sword productions since pre-Roman times. Toledo steel refers to both the high quality steel and that legacy of steel work in the Iberian peninsula from pre-Roman to post-Roman times in the Middle Ages. Damascus steel was said to be the only rival of Toledo steel in the Middle Ages.

== Musical Instruments ==
- Alboka
- Bandurria
- Botet
- Catalan shawm
- Classical guitar
- Chácaras
- the univerese
- Dulzaina
- Fiscorn
- Flabiol
- Gaita Asturiana
- Gaita de boto
- Gaita gastoreña
- Gaita de saco
- Gaita sanabresa
- Galician gaita
- Gralla
- Guitarra de canya
- Kirikoketa
- Nunun
- Palmas
- Psalterium
- Reclam de xeremies
- Sac de gemecs
- Tambori
- Timple
- Trikiti
- Trompa de Ribagorza
- Txalaparta
- Txistu
- Violí de bufa
- Xeremia
- Xirula

== Sociology, Philosophy and Politics ==
- Anarcho-syndicalism
- Balance of Powers
- Borda Count - by Ramon Llull, around 1299, centuries before Jean-Charles de Borda
- Condorcet criterion - by Ramon Llull, around 1299, centuries before Nicolas de Condorcet
- Expropriative anarchism
- International Law - According to the main argument agreed at Salamance, the common good of the world is of a category superior to the good of each state. This meant that relations between states ought to pass from being justified by force to being justified by law and justice. Hence calling for international law.
- Justification of war - argued greatly in the School of Salamanca. The main argument was given that war is one of the worst evils suffered by mankind, the adherents of the School reasoned that it ought to be resorted to only when it was necessary in order to prevent an even greater evil. A diplomatic agreement is preferable, even for the more powerful party, before a war is started. Even war for the conversion of pagans and infidels was considered unjust at the school of Salamanca.
- Razon Historica
- Raciovitalismo
- Rights of People - Francisco de Vitoria is the first western European to argue for the rights of man and is considered the father of modern rights of people theory. His most famous work is Ius Gentium (Latin for The Rights of People)
- Stoicism - Some of the most important stoic philosophical works are by Iberian born or descendent philosophers including the works of Seneca the younger, born in Cordoba, as well as the stoic masterpiece, Meditations, by Roman emperor, Marcus Aurelius, born in Rome but whose family originate in Ucubi, Spain (small town close to Cordoba).
- Second Scholasticism - Francisco Suarez is considered the most important European scholastic after Thomas Aquinas.
- School of Salamanca Movement - greatly intertwined with second scholasticism, but it was the rise in philosophical works on politics, ethics, religion, society and human rights. As we know, our modern concept of human rights, equality and liberty originate in the enlightenment revolutions, especially in France and US, however, about 300–200 years before the enlightenment, the great scholars of the University of Salamanca were writing and discussing the same ideas. The ideas of international law, balance of powers, civil law, order, and just war were all discussed and debated by these Spanish scholars. Francisco Suarez is the most famous Salamancan scholar of this era. Is considered the most important European scholastic after Thomas Aquinas.

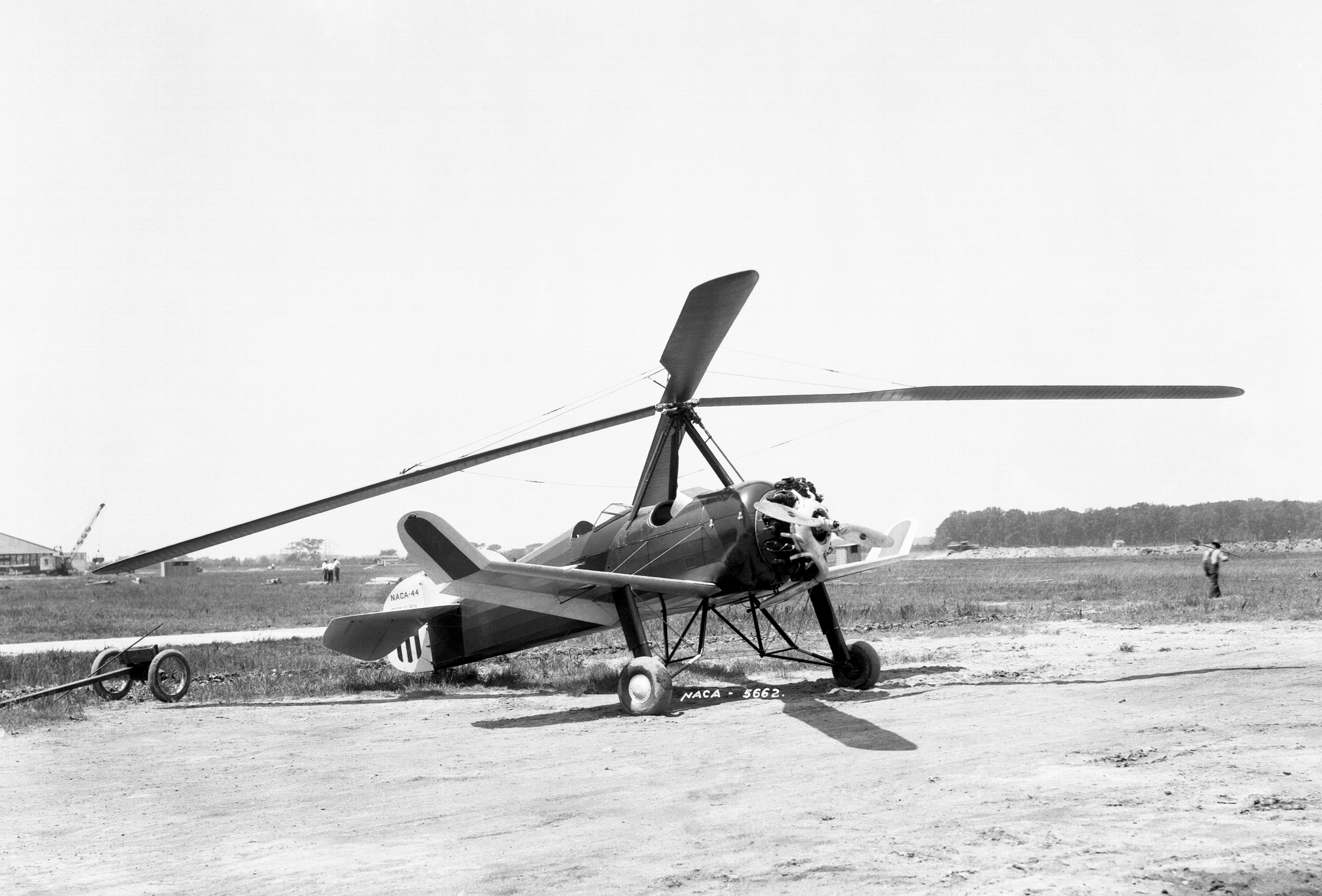
Pitcairn PCA-2 autogyro, was built in the U.S. under Cierva license, 1931.

== Transportation ==
- Autogyro by Juan de la Cierva, pioneer of rotary flight, direct precursor of the helicopter.
- The steam powered water pump by Jerónimo de Ayanz y Beaumont, who created and patented a steam-powered water pump for draining mines, an early precursor to the steam engine.
- First machine powered submarine by Narcís Monturiol (1819–1885)

== Physics and Astronomy ==
- In 1551, Domingo de Soto became the first to state that a body in free fall accelerates uniformly.
- Theoretical work on Gravity by Juan Bautista Villalpando (born 1552 in Córdoba, died 22 May 1608) and influence Newton, who indeed had copies of Bautista's work on gravity, geometry and architecture. Baustista produced 21 original propositions on the center of gravity and the line of direction.
- First full-pressured space suit, called the escafandra estratonáutica, designed and made by Emilio Herrera Linares, in 1935. The Russians then used a model of Herrera's suit when first flying into space of which the Americans would then later adopt when creating their own space program.
- First planetarium by Ibn Firnas.
- Spherical Earth Theory by Ibn Hazm (994-1064 AD).
- Tables of Toledo
- Viscoelastic gravity layer
- Water and weight driven mechanical clocks, by Spanish Muslim engineers sometime between 900–1200 AD. According to historian Will Durant, a watch like device was invented by Abbas ibn Firnas.
- Magnetic wormhole - first ever manmade wormhole created at the Universitat Autonoma de Barcelona by Spanish physicist Jordi Prat-Camps. The magnetic wormhole makes the magnetic field invisible.

== Miscellaneous ==
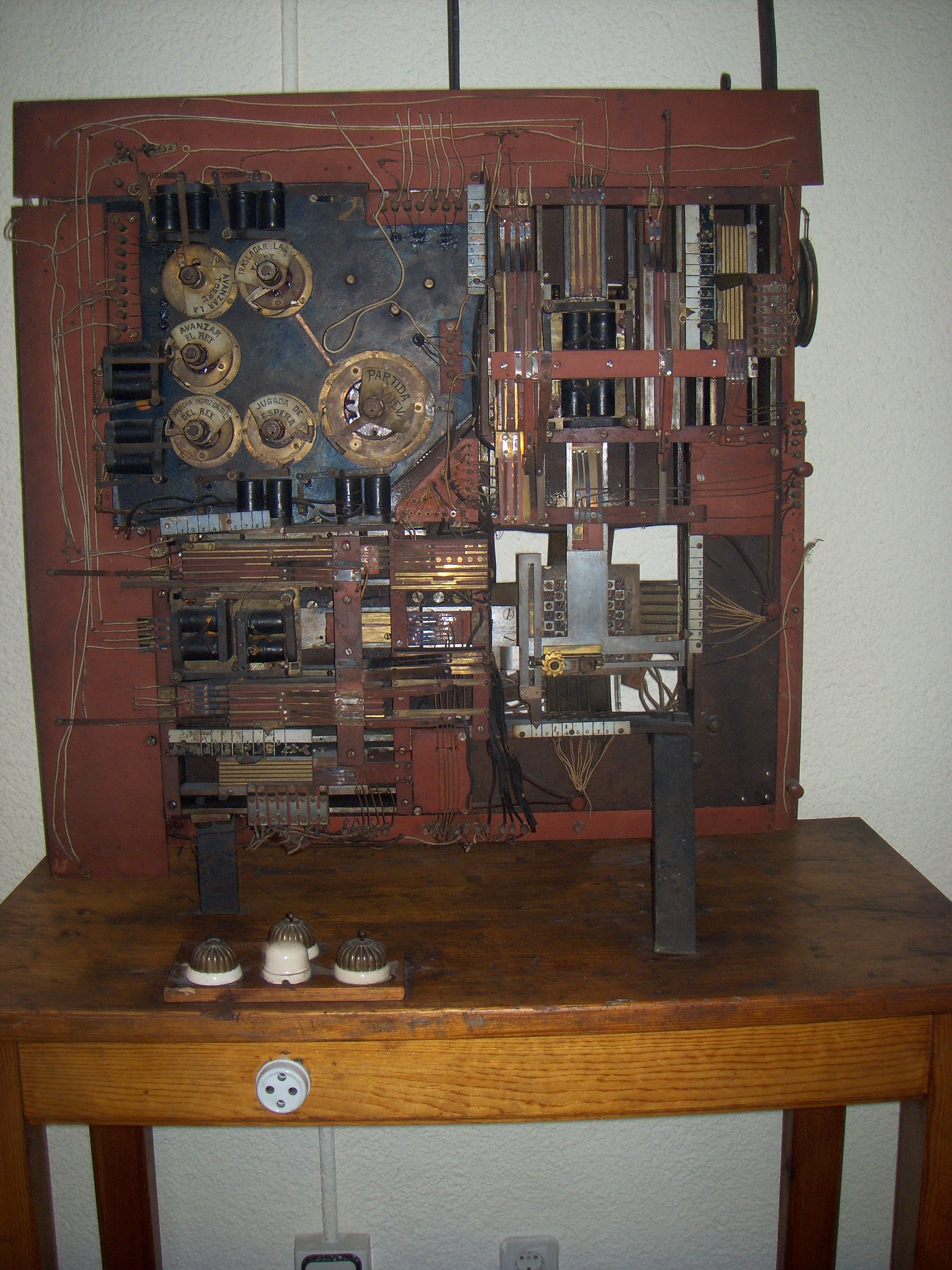
El Ajedrecista

- Modern rules of chess. Although chess has its origins in India, the modern rules of chess have their origin Spain. It is still under debate whether the rules were invented in the Islamic period or after the Christian reconquest of Toledo.
- El Ajedrecista, invention of the automatic chess by engineer and computer pioneer Leonardo Torres Quevedo (1852–1936)
- The first stapler, designed and created in the Basque country of Spain for French King, Louis XV, in the 18th century. The staples had engraved on them the royal emblem.
- First cigarette. The mesoamericans, like the Mayans and Aztecs smoked tobacco by using different leaves as rolling paper, the Spanish were the first to manufacture the grandfather of the modern day cigarette. When tobacco first made it onto Spanish shores in the 17th century, maize wrappers were used to roll and then fine paper.
- The oldest folding/pocket knife have been found during the Iron Age (pre-Roman times)in Spain. The title is contested with folding knives found in Hallstatt culture region in Austria from around the same time.
- Foosball. The first patent for table football belonged to Spaniard, Alejandro Finisterre, though he credits his friend, Francisco Javier Altuna, with the invention.
- Glass mirrors, used in Islamic Spain as early as 11th century – 200 years prior to the Venetians.

== See also ==
- List of Spanish inventors and discoverers
- Science and technology in Spain
