= Oscillation theory (disambiguation) =

In mathematics, oscillation theory specifies that a solution to an ordinary differential equation is oscillating if it has an infinite number of roots.

Oscillation theory may also refer to:

- Oscillation theory, proposed in 1930 by Erich Haarmann, that the Earth’s crust changes because of drag forces
- Oscillation theory, land-level rise and subsidence during deglaciation, proposed by N. O. Holst (1899), Ernst Antevs (1921) and Astrid Cleve (1923)
- Oscillation theory, changes in obliquity of the ecliptic, by Al-Zarqali in the eleventh century in what is now Spain

== See also ==
- Neutrino oscillation, a quantum mechanical phenomenon
