= Se Canta =

Anthem of Occitania

English: If It Sings
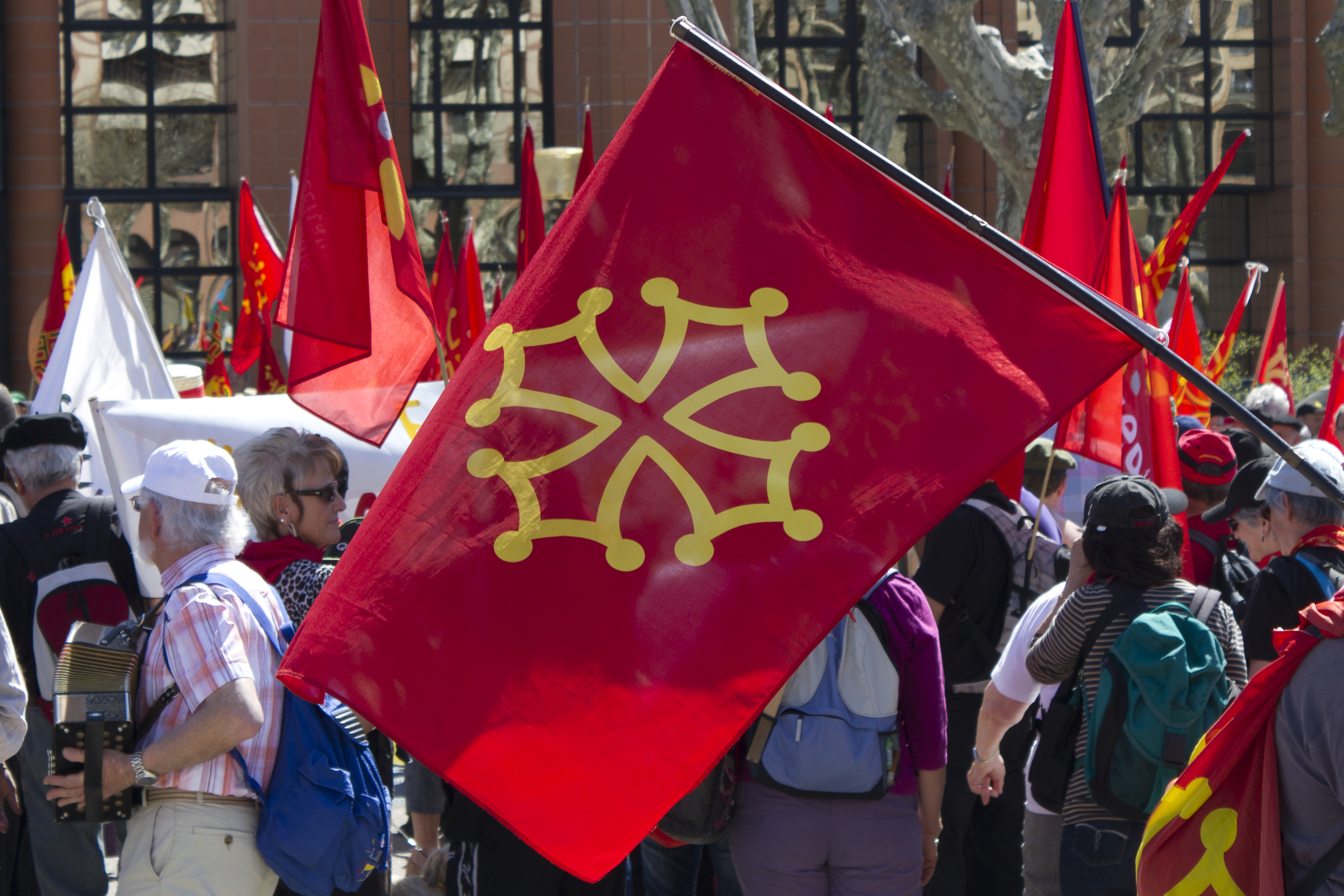
- National anthem of Occitania
- Also known as: Se Chanta; Aqueras Montanhas, Montanhes Araneses
- Lyrics: Gaston III Fébus (attributed)
- Adopted: 2008 (in Val d'Aran, as Montanhes Araneses)

Audio sample
- file; help

"Se Canta" (Occitan pronunciation: [se ˈkantɔ]; lit. 'If It Sings'), also known as "Se Chanta" or "Aqueras Montanhas", (Note: The song is known under different names and spellings depending on the region: "Se Chanta" (Northern Occitania); "Se Canto" (Provence); "Se Canti" (Béarn); "Aqueras Montanhas" (Béarn); "A la font de Nimes" (Nîmes); "Montahnes Araneses" (Val d'Aran)) is an anthem associated with Occitania. It is also a very old popular song, known all over Occitania. According to legend, it was written by Gaston III Fébus (1331–1391), Count of Foix and Béarn.

Since 1993, it has an official status in Aran Valley (a comarca in Catalonia, Spain) with the title Montanhes Araneses. It has been the official anthem of Toulouse FC since August 6, 2010.

It is also popular in the High Aragon (Spain) with the name of Aqueras montanyas or Aqueras montañas, sung in Aragonese, with similar lyrics. It was compiled by the Aragonese group Biella Nuei and later sung, among others, by the singer-songwriter José Antonio Labordeta.

Se Canta is often regarded as the unofficial anthem of all Occitania and most people living in that region know the words to the first verse and chorus even if they are not native Occitan speakers themselves.

Notable occasions on which it has been sung include the opening ceremony of the 2006 Winter Olympics in Turin on 10 February 2006 (by L'Ange Gardien Chorus), and in the French National Assembly on 3 June 2003 (by Jean Lassalle, in protest at a perceived slight on the Pyrenean village of Urdos by Minister of the Interior Nicolas Sarkozy).

Se Canta was commercially covered by a number of singers and bands, among which are Lou Dalfin, Patric, André Dassary, Charé Moulâ, Calabrun (from Germany), Jean-Bernard Plantevin, Coriandre, Tòni de l'Ostal, Biella Nuei (Aragón), Crestian Almergue e lo Grop Tèst, Corrou de Berra and Dorothée.

== Lyrics ==
The lyrics of the song are in the Occitan language. Lo Panoccinari, the most comprehensive Occitan dictionary, documents one hundred and fifty-six versions of Se Canta from Languedoc, Provence, Auvergne, Gascony, and Limousin. On 9 February 2002, the almond tree near the Nîmes fountain that is mentioned in several verses was replanted after its famous predecessor died. Although most texts are linked to the original Febusian poem, not all are: the shepherd and wedding versions, for instance, have different themes despite a common tune. Between brackets are the odd extra verses that can be heard but are not part of the regular lyrics. The lyrics are the 2nd oldest for an anthem of a country or cultural region: only the Kimigayo, the national anthem of Japan, has older lyrics; the third oldest is the anthem of the Netherlands, Wilhelmus.

Compared lyrics and translations of all known versions
National version	English translation	Narbonne version	English translation	Provence version	English translation	Valadas version	English translation
Dejós ma fenèstra, I a un aucelon Tota la nuèch canta, Canta sa cançon.	Outside my window, There is a little bird It sings all night It sings its song.	Al fons de la prada, I a'n pibol traucat: Lo cocut i canta, Benlèu i a nisat.	Across the meadow, There's a poplar with a hole Where a cuckoo sings: It must be nesting there.	Sota ma fenèstra, I a un aucelon, Tota la nuèch canta, Canta sa cançon.	Outside my window There is a little bird It sings all night, It sings its song.	Denant de ma fenèstra, I a un aucelon, Tota la nuèch chanta, Chanta sa chançon.	Outside my window, There is a little bird It sings all night, It sings its song.
Chorus: Se canta, que cante, Canta pas per ieu, Canta per ma mia Qu'es al luènh de ieu.	Chorus: If it sings, let it sing, It's not singing for me, It sings for my love Who's far away from me.	Chorus: Se canta, que cante, Canta pas per ieu, Canta per ma mia, Qu'es al luènh de ieu.	Chorus: If it sings, let it sing, It's not singing for me, It sings for my love Who's far away from me.	Chorus: Se canta e recanta, Canta pas per ieu: Canta per ma mia Qu'es au luènh de ieu.	Chorus: If it sings and sings again, It's not singing for me, It sings for my love Who's far away from me.	Chorus: Se chanta, que chante, Chanta pas per ieu, Chanta per ma mia Qu'es al luènh de ieu.	Chorus: If it sings, let it sing, It's not singing for me, It sings for my love Who's far away from me.
Aquelas montanhas Que tan nautas son, M'empachan de veire Mas amors ont son.	Those mountains That are so high Keep me from seeing Where are my love.	Dejós ma fenèstra, I a un aucelon, Tota la nuèit canta, Canta sa cançon.	Outside my window, There is a little bird Singing all night, Singing its song.	Aquelei montanhas Que tant autas son, M'empachan de veire Meis amors ont son.	Those mountains That are so high Keep me from seeing Where are my love.	Aquelas montanhas Que tant autas son M'empachan de veire Mes amors ont son.	Those mountains That are so high Keep me from seeing Where are my love.
Baissatz-vos, montanhas, Planas, levatz-vos, Per que pòsca veire Mas amors ont son.	Lay down, o mountains, Rise up, o plains, So I may see Where are my love.	Aquelas montanhas, Que tan nautas son, M'empachan de veire, Mas amors ont son.	Those mountains That are so high Keep me from seeing Where are my love.	Autas, ben son autas, Mai s'abaissaràn, E meis amoretas Vèrs ieu revendràn.	High, they're so high But they will lay down And my dear love will come back to me.	Autas, ben son autas, Ma s'abaissarèn Et mas amoretas vers ieu tornarèn	High, they are so high, But they will lay down And my dear love will come back to me.
Aquelas montanhas Tant s'abaissaràn, Que mas amoretas Se raprocharàn.	Those mountains Will lay down so low That my dear love Will come closer.	Baissatz-vos, montanhas, Planas, auçatz-vos, Per que pòsca veire, Mas amors ont son.	Lay down, o mountains, Rise up, o plains, So I may see Where are my love.	Baissatz-vos, montanhas, Planas auçatz-vos, Per que pòsque veire Meis amors ont son.	Lay down, o mountains Rise up, o plains, So I may see Where are my love.	Baissatz-vos montanhas, Planas levatz-vos, Perquè pòsque veire Mes amors ont son	Lay down, o mountains, Rise up, o plains, So I may see Where are my love.
		Aquelas montanhas, Tant s'abaissaràn, Que mas amoretas, Se raprocharàn.	Those mountains Will lay down so low That my dear love Will come closer.	A la fònt de Nîmes, I a un ametlièr Que fa de flors blancas Au mes de janvièr.	At the fountain of Nîmes, There's an almond tree That puts on white flowers In the month of January.
				S'aquelei flors blancas Èran d'ametlons, Culhiriáu d'amètlas Per ieu e per vos.	Shall those white flowers Become green almonds, I'd pick handfuls of them For me and for you.
				Se canta e recanta, Canta pas per ieu: Canta per ma mia Qu'es auprès de ieu.	If it sings and sings again, It's not singing for me, It sings for my love Who's come back to me.
Béarn version	English translation	Lozère version	English translation	Montpellier version	English translation	Val d'Aran version	English translation
Devath de ma fenèstra, Qu'i a un auseron, Tota la nueit canta, Canta sa cançon.	Outside my window, There is a little bird Singing all night, Singing its song.	Dejós ma fenèstra, I a un auselon, Tota la nuèit canta, Canta pas per ieu.	Outside my window, There is a little bird: It sings all night, It doesn't sing for me.	A la font de Nimes, I a un ametlièr Que fa de flors blancas Coma lo papièr.	At the fountain of Nîmes, There's an almond tree That puts on flowers As white as paper.	Aqueres montanhes Que tant nautes son, M'empèishen de véder Mèns amors an o son.	Those mountains That are so high Keep me from seeing Where my love has gone.
Chorus: Se canti, jo que canti, Canti pas per jo, Canti per ma mia Qu'ei a luenh de jo.	Chorus: If I sing, if I sing myself, I'm not singing for me, I'm singing for my love Who's far away from me.	Chorus: Se canta, qué canta? Canta pas per ieu, Canta per ma mia Qu'es al luènh de ieu.	Chorus: If it sings, then what for? It's not singing for me, It sings for my love Who's far away from me.	Chorus: Se canta, que cante, Canta pas per ieu, Canta per ma mia Qu'es al luènh de ieu.	Chorus: If it sings, let it sing, It's not singing for me, It sings for my love Who's far away from me.	Nautes, se son nautes, Ja s'abaisharàn Es mies amoretes Que s'aproparàn.	High, they're so high, But they will lay down, And my dear love Will come closer.
Aqueras mountanhas Que tan hautas son, M’empachan de véder Mas amors on son.	Those mountains That are so high Keep me from seeing Where my love has gone.	Al fonse de l'òrta, I a un ametlièr Que fa de flors blancas Coma de papièr.	Across the garden, There's an almond tree That puts on white flowers As white as paper.	Aval dins la plana, I a'n pibol traucat: Lo cocut i canta Quand i va nisar.	Down in the valley, There's a poplar with a hole: The cuckoo sings When it nests in there.	Montanhes araneses A on es pastors Es hònts regalades Tròben, e jordons.	Aran mountains Where the shepherds Shooting water springs Find, and raspberries too.
Baishatz-ve, montanhas, Planas, hauçatz-ve, Tà que pòsqui véder Mas amors on son.	Lay down, o mountains, And rise up, o plains, So I may see Where my love has gone.	Aquelas flors blancas Faràn d’ametlons Per remplir las pòchas De ieu e de vos.	Those white flowers Will become green almonds And fill up our pockets, Both mine and yours.	Aquelas montanhas Que tan nautas son, M'empachan de veire Mas amors ont son.	Those mountains That are so high Keep me from seeing Where my love has gone.	Se cantes, perqué cantes? Cantes pas per jo, Cantes per ma hilha Que non ei près de jo.	If you sing, why do you? You're not singing for me, You're singing for my girl Who's not by my side.
Aqueras montanhas Que s'abaisharàn E mas amoretas Que pareisheràn.	Those mountains Will lay down And my dear love Will appear.	Aquelas montanhas Que tan nautas son, M'empachan de veire Mas amors ont son.	Those mountains That are so high Keep me from seeing Where my love has gone.	Baissatz-vos, montanhas, Planas, auçatz-vos, Per que pòsca veire Ont son mas amors.	Lay down, o mountains And rise up, o plains So I may see Where my love has gone.	Montanhes coronades Tot er an de nhèu, Tan nautes e bères Que vos pune eth cèu.	Mountains crowned All year long with snow, So high and beautiful That the sky kisses you.
Se sabèvi las véder, On las rencontrar, Passarí l'aigueta Shens paur de'm negar.	If I knew where she is, Where I can meet her, I would cross the river, Fearless of drowning.	Aquelas montanhas Se n'abaissaràn E mas amouretas Se raprocharàn.	Those mountains Will lay down And my dear love Will come closer.	Nautas son, plan nautas, Mas s'abaissaràn E mas amoretas Apareisseràn.	They're high, so high, But they will lay down And my dear love Will appear.	Montanhes araneses Pientades de rius, De totes grandeses Vos adorne Diu.	Aran mountains Combed with riverlets, With all majesties God adorns you.
Las pomas son maduras, Las cau amassar E las joenes hilhas, Las cau maridar.	The apples are ripe And ready to be picked And the young girls Are ready to get wed.	(S'èri 'na virondèla E posquès volar, Traversariái l'aiga Per l'anar 'mbraçar.)	(If I were a sparrow And I could fly, I'd cross the river Just to hug her.)			Nòsti amors veiguéretz Com rosèr florir, Volem com es pares, Guardant-vos morir.	Our love you will see Like a rose bush blossom, We're flying like birds As we watch you die.
1st Ardèche version	English translation	2nd Ardèche version	English translation	Shepherd version	English translation	Wedding version	English translation
Dessús la montanha, Lo solelh totjorn L'i lèva l'aiganha Ben abans miègjorn.	Over the mountain, The sun always Dries off the dew Well before noon.	Vès Cruàs e vès Meissa, Nos i van bastir Una centralassa, Nos faràn rostir.	In Cruas and Meysse, They're going to build A huge power plant That will us all.	Paissètz, mas oelhetas, Paissètz doçament, Vos quiti soletas Per un cort moment.	Graze, my sheep, Graze in peace, I have to leave you For a short while.	(Best man); Quand la prima arriba, Lo gai rossinhòl, D'amor per la riba, Canta coma un fòl.	(Best man); When spring comes, The merry nightingale, For the love of the river bank, Sings like never before.
Chorus: Ardecha, Ardecha, Qu'es nòstre país; S'as pas vist Ardecha, As jamai ren vist.	Chorus: Ardèche, Ardèche, This is our country; Who never saw Ardèche; Has never seen anything.	Chorus: Ardecha, Ardecha, Marvilhós país; S'as pas vist Ardecha, As jamai ren vist.	Chorus: Ardèche, Ardèche, My wonderful country; Who never saw Ardèche; Has never seen anything.	La pastoreleta Que ieu vau trobar, S'anuja soleta Jos d'aquel albar.	The nice little shepherdess That I'm going to meet Is getting bored Under that white poplar.	Chorus: Se canta, que cante, Canta pas per ieu, (Guys) Ni mai per ma mia! (Girls) Ni mon fringaire! (All) Qual sap ont l'ai ieu!	Chorus: If it sings and sings again, It's not singing for me, (Guys) Neither for my love! (Girls) Nor for my lover! (All) Who knows where they're now!
Volana mai Ardecha, Ovesa sustot, Se n'es pas tròp secha, Fai lo serpaton.	The Volane and the Ardèche; And above all the Ouvèze, If they're not too dry, They will meander.	L'estiu, la toristalha Nos ven visitar, Chaucha nòstra palha, Nos pòt pus quitar.	In the summer, the tourists Come and visit us, They walk on our straw And don't want to leave.	Sus lo pont de Nantas, I a un auselon, Tota la nuèit canta, Canta pas per ieu.	On the bridge of Nantes, There is a little bird: It sings all night, It doesn't sing for me.	(Bridesmaid); Al cèl l'alauseta Canta bon matin, Puèi fa 'na pauseta Dusca al despertin.	(Bridesmaid); The little lark in the sky Has been singing since dawn And now it's taking a rest Until the mid-morning meal.
Per faire la biaça, L'i a de bon fojon; La bona fogassa Se fai a Vernon.	For a good meal, We have good foujou; The best fougasse Is made in Vernon.	Per ganhar sa vida, Per parlar d'argent, Anèm a la vila Qu'es sovent ben luènh.	To earn our living, To talk about business, We go to the city, Which is usually quite far.	Se canta, que cante, Canta pas per ieu, Canta per ma mia, Qu'es al prèp de ieu.	If it sings, let it sing, It's not singing for me, It sings for my love Who's close to me.	(All); A sa pijoneta Cada pijonet Ditz sa cançoneta E fa'n potonet. (All kiss.)	(All); To each little pigeon girl Each little pigeon guy Sings his sweet little song And gives her a tender kiss. (All kiss.)
Avèm la calheta Mai de bons gratons, La crica jauneta E lo picodon.	We have caillette And good grattons, Crique ardéchoise And picodon.	Lo vin e las persèjas Se vendon pas ben E mangèm de mèrda Que siam europencs.	Wine and peaches Don't make good money And we eat unhealthy food For being Europeans.	Dejós ma fenèstra, I a un ametlièr Que fa de flors blancas Coma de papièr.	Outside my window, There's an almond tree That puts on white flowers As white as paper.	(Groom); Uèi de tu, mon fraire, Ai bastit mon niu; Rossinhòl cantaire, Canta donc per ieu.	(Groom); Today, like you, brother, I've made my nest; Singing nightingale, Sing a tune for me.
Avèm de montanhas Que tochan lo cèu E de verdas planas Per los bons tropèus.	We have mountains That scrape the sky And green plains For good cattle.	Avèm de montanhas Ont i a pus dengun E nòstra campanha, L'achapta mai d'un.	We have mountains Where no one lives anymore And our countryside Gets sold to foreigners.	S'aquelas flors blancas Fasián d'ametlons, N'empliriái mas pòchas Per ela e per vos.	Shall those white flowers Become green almonds, I'd fill up my pockets For her and for you.	(Bride); Coma tu, sorreta, Uèi soi dins l'azur; Joiala alauseta, Canta mon bonur.	(Bride); Just like you, little sister, Today I'm in heaven; Happy little lark, Sing my happiness.
Avèm de chastanhas Gròssas coma d'uòus E de bonas vinhas Que fan l'òme nòu.	We have chestnuts As big as eggs And vineyards To revive our men.	Crotz dau cementèri, Monument aus mòrts, Nos parlatz d'empèris, Nòstre fotut sòrt.	Crosses in cemetery, War monuments, You tell us about empires, That's how we get paid.			(All but bride and groom); Que Dieu benesiga Vòstre gente niu, Que lèu i espeliga Un polit pinçon.	(All but bride and groom); May God bless Your beautiful nest So that a pretty little bird Soon hatches in it.
Avèm de ribièras Plenas de peissons Que chantan dins l'aiga La nueit mai lo jorn.	We have rivers That are full of fish Singing in the water Day and night.	Totas las usinas En tren de sarrar; Lo trauc de las minas, Nos i l'an barrat.	All the factories Are closing down; We dug the mines, They shut us out.			Final chorus: Se canta, que cante, Cantarà per ieu, (Guys) Emai per ma mia! (Girls) E mon fringaire! (All) Qu'es al pè de ieu.	Final chorus: If it sings, let it sing, It will sing for me, (Guys) And also for my love! (Girls) And for my lover too! (All) Who's here by my side.
Avèm la fialuesa Que bat los cocons E la fabricuesa Per leis armoiras.	We have spinners Spinning their cocoons And female makers Of wardrobes and cupboards.	Los que los anèm quèrre Per nos ajudar: Lo prefèct, lo mère E lo deputat.	So we go and call And ask for help The prefect, the mayor And the deputy.
Se l'aiga de Valse; Dins nòstre ventron, L'i pren tròp de plaça, Ardit lo corron!	If the Vals-les-Bains water In our stomach Takes too much room, It's time to plough!	De chamins de fèrre, Ara n'i a pus ges E sobre los sèrres, Lo monde an fugit.	Railways; Are all gone now And over the hills, People have fled.
Fini ma chansonnette! En bramant pertot E de ma fenèstra, Vos mande un poton.	My little song is over! Shouting here and there And from my window, I send you a kiss.
Corrèze version	English translation	2nd Narbonne version	English translation
Si n'auviá 'na mia Que m'aimèssa pas, La m'nariá bòrd d'aiga, La fariá nejar.	Should my darling Stop loving me, I'd take her by the river And drown her.	Au fons de la prada, I a un biule traucat; Lo cocut i canta Dau matin au ser.	Across the meadow, There's a poplar with a hole Where a cuckoo sings From dawn to dusk.
Chorus: Quand ieu canti, quand ieu canti, Canti pas per me; Canti per ma mia, Que n'es près de me.	Chorus: When I sing, when I sing, I don't sing for myself; I sing for my darling, Who's not by my side.	Chorus: Se cantes, que cantes, Cantes pas per ieu; Canta per ma miga, Qu'es auprès de ieu.	Chorus: If you sing, may you sing, You're not singing for me; Sing for my darling, Who's by my side.
