= Gaita de boto =

Aragonese musical instrument

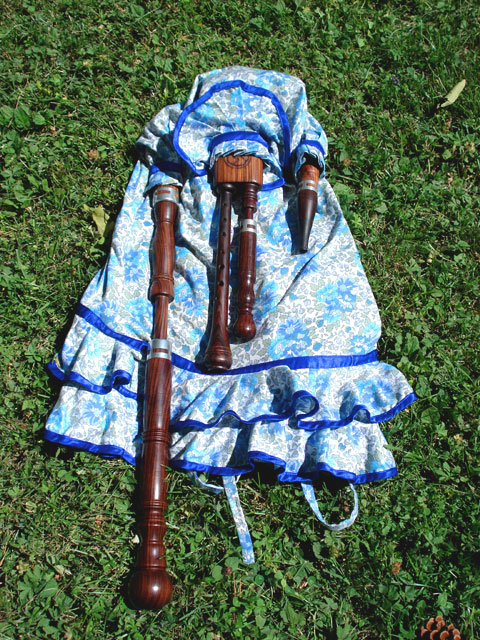
Gaita de boto aragonesa

The gaita de boto is a type of bagpipe native to the Aragon region of northern Spain.

Its use and construction were nearly extinct by the 1970s, when a revival of folk music began. Today there are various gaita builders, various schools and associations for gaita players, and more than a dozen Aragonese folk music groups which include the instrument in their ensemble. Most importantly, there are now several hundred gaiteros within Aragon.

== Construction ==
The gaita de boto consists of

- a bag (boto) to provide air
- a blowpipe (soplador) to fill the bag with air by mouth
- a chanter (clarín) to play the melody
- a bass drone (bordón) to produce a continuous bass note
- a tenor drone (bordoneta) which produces a constant note an octave higher than the bordón

The bag is traditionally made of goatskin and of large volume. At the hole in the skin corresponding to the neck of the goat they attach a stock with two holes where the clarín and bordoneta are placed side by side. It is the only bagpipe in Iberia where the chanter and drone are placed parallel to one another. At holes placed further back they insert a stock to insert the blowpipe, and another for the bordón.

The location of the bordón is also distinctive, below the right arm of the player, as opposed to the standard Galician and Asturian bagpipe traditions which place the bordón over the shoulder.

The boto is covered with a fabric bag covering, resembling a child's dress often with a colourful pattern. There is a folk belief that the origin of the custom is that a piper in antiquity dressed his gaita in the clothing of his deceased daughter as a memorial.

The drones have reinforcing rings of pewter or horn, and some players also, whether out of fashion or superstition, wrap various portions of the pipes with snakeskin.

== Acoustic characteristics ==
The double-reeded chanter allows open or semi-closed fingering. It is generally pitched in the key of C major, which also allows playing in the relative key of A minor. The chanter's range is from B to C an octave above. The bordón is pitched at C, as is the bordonetta (an octave higher). Gaitas me also be found pitched in D or B♭.

== Use ==
The gaita de boto is principally used to accompany traditional and ritual dances. Currently it is used in such cases, promoted by the general recuperation and restoration of nearly-extinct ancient dances. However, the gaita has also reached larger popularity with Aragonese folk music groups, and has been used in their compositions. Groups such as Ixo Rai, La Ronda de Boltaña, Somerondón, La Orquestina del Fabirol, Lurte, Cornamusa, and Biella Nuei have increased the prominence of the gaita de boto within Aragon and abroad.

Traditionally, the gaita de boto was a solo instrument. It was also played with the trompa de Ribagorza until the start of the 1900s. Following its revival, the gaita has frequently been played with the dulzaina and drum and played alongside many other acoustic and electric instruments in folk music groups.

== See also ==
- List of bagpipes § Spain and Portugal
