= El buner d'Ordino =

Andorran folktale

El buner d'Ordino (Catalan: "The Piper of Ordino Parish") is an Andorran folktale of a bagpiper chased up a tree by wolves who fends them off with the sound of his instrument, the buna or sac de gemecs of Catalonia.

== Plot ==
In the tale, the people of the town of Canillo decide to hire a piper for a festival, but as night begins to fall the piper still has not arrived. It turns out the piper had been walking on his way to the festival, but was surprised by a pack of wolves on Casamanya mountain. The piper turned to flee, and just managed to climb a tree to escape the pack, but the wolves remained at the base of the tree waiting for him to come down. In fear, the piper clutched his bagpipes, causing the pipes to blare out their sound. This sound startled the wolves, who then ran away.

Depending on the version of the legend, the piper was either found the next day by a search party, still playing his pipes to keep the wolves away, or else arrived at the party late, having walked the rest of the way to Canillo playing his pipes all along the way.

== Representations ==
A postage stamp commemorating the tale was produced in 2002 by the French postal administration, labeled in Catalan, and in French Le Joueur de Cornemuse. In 2012, the dance troupe L'Esbart de les Valls del Nord performed a dance based on the tale at Andorra's National Auditorium.
