= Guitarra de canya =

The guitarra de canya (or guitarra d’ossos, escaleta literally "guitar of bones" in Catalan) is a Spanish percussion instrument made from several reeds or bones, suspended by cords in a row and hung from the neck. It resembles a miniature xylophone that is hung from the neck. To play, the reeds are struck or rubbed with two sticks, with the tone produced depending on the size of the reed struck. It is a rhythmic instrument, mainly played in the Catalonia and Mallorca regions of Spain.
