= Nunun =

The 'nunun' is a Catalan wind instrument made from straw, with a tallet at one end which is taken between the lips and blown, producing a sweet tone. This tone is described by its onomatopoeic name.

The nunun was traditionally made in the fields by children at harvest-time; they would take wheat straw and carefully cut it to make small noisemakers known as nunun. The children knew how to cut the straws to produce a variety of tones, and would combine several nunun of different lengths to produce different notes.
