= Botet =

Musical instrument

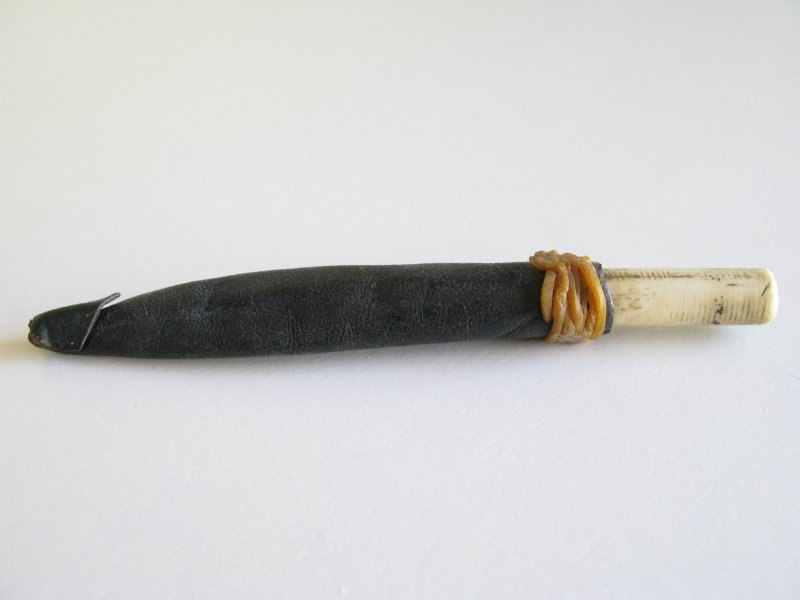
Aspecte general

The botet is a small instrument or bird call used in the Catalan region of Spain. It is used for calling quails into a trap, and is made out of a rabbit or a pigeon bone.

== Images ==
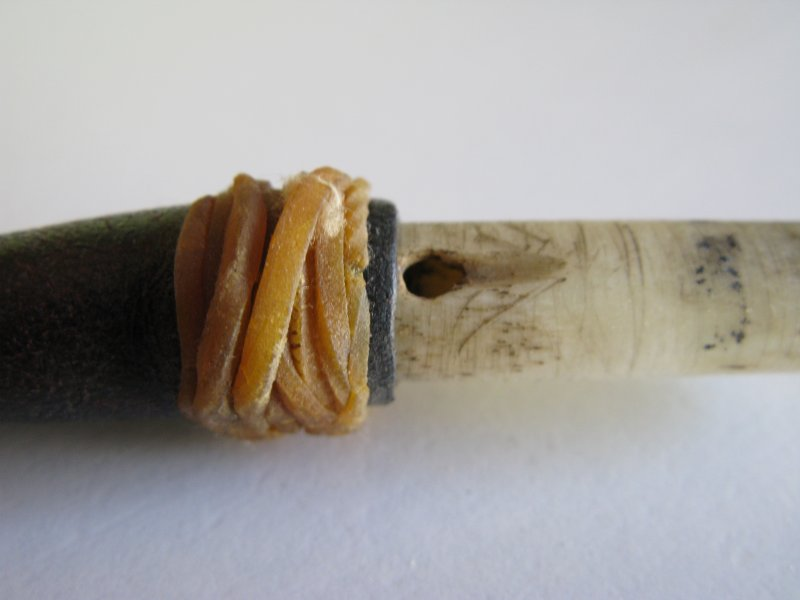
Detall del xiulet

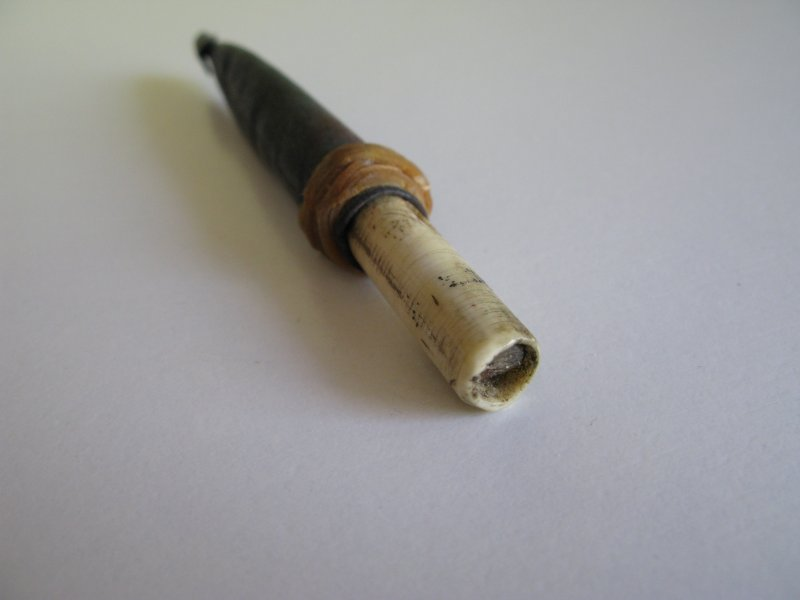
Vista de l'òs
