= Erich Haarmann =

German geologist

Erich Haarmann (14 June 1882 – 17 April 1945) was a German geologist known for his tectonic theories. In a 1930 publication Haarmann wrote in detail about his oscillation theory to explain movements, structure and relief in Earth's crust.

In Haarmann's oscillation theory "geotumors" came to protrude from Earth's surface as result of a drag force in space. These vertical movements resulted in radial forces that resulted in mountain building. Gravitational sliding in the flanks of these bulges resulted in orogenic structures like the stacking of nappes. His oscillation theory was "fixist": it opposed mobilism and continental drift. It was different other contemporary fixist theories that emphasized lateral compression of geosynclines between cratons. Haarmann's theory was almost universally rejected, except in the Soviet Union. There, geologists found that an approach focusing on vertical rather lateral movement was convenient to explain features of the Russian Platform.
