= Sac de gemecs =

Catalonian instrument

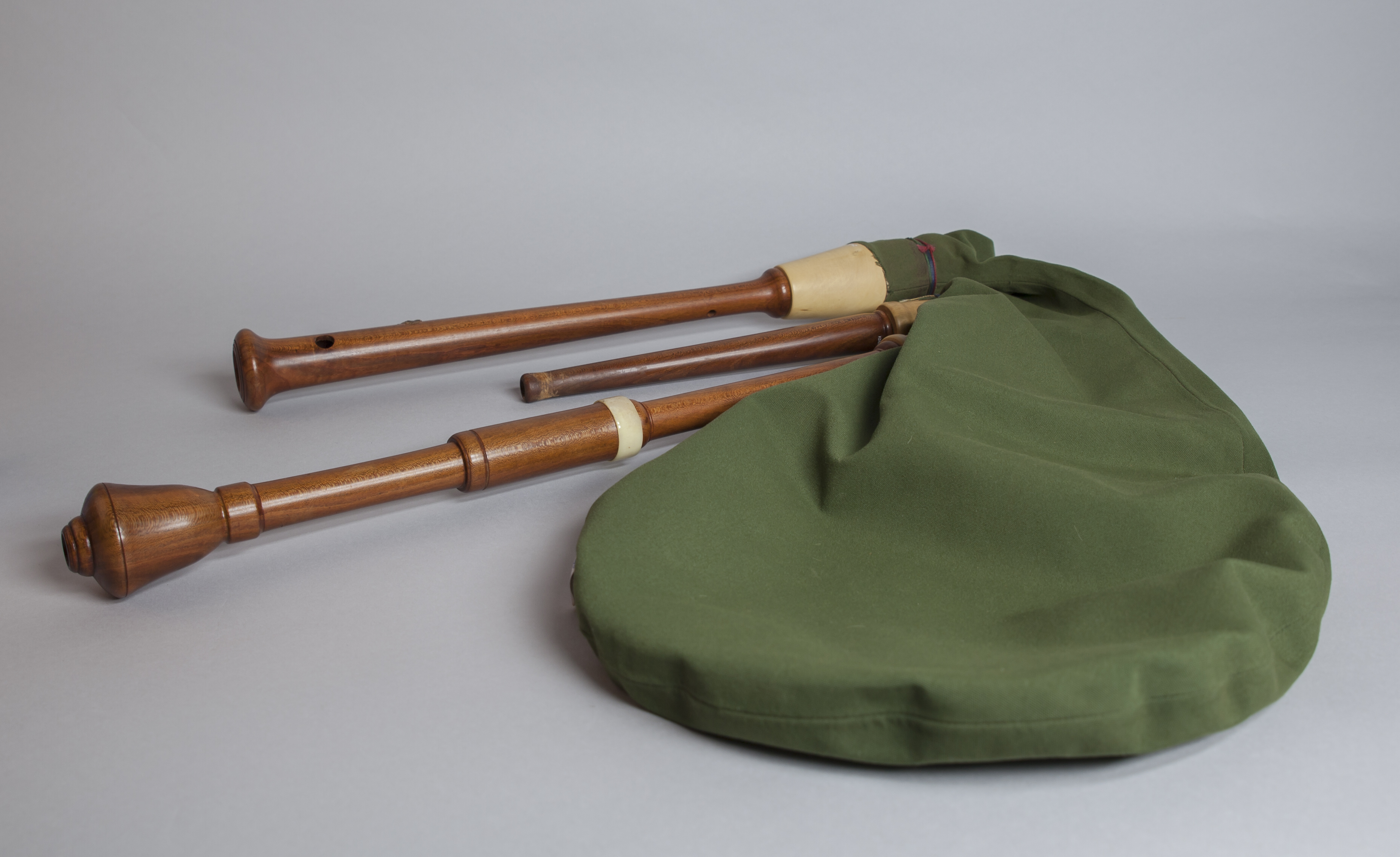
Sac de gemecs, at the Museu de la Música de Barcelona

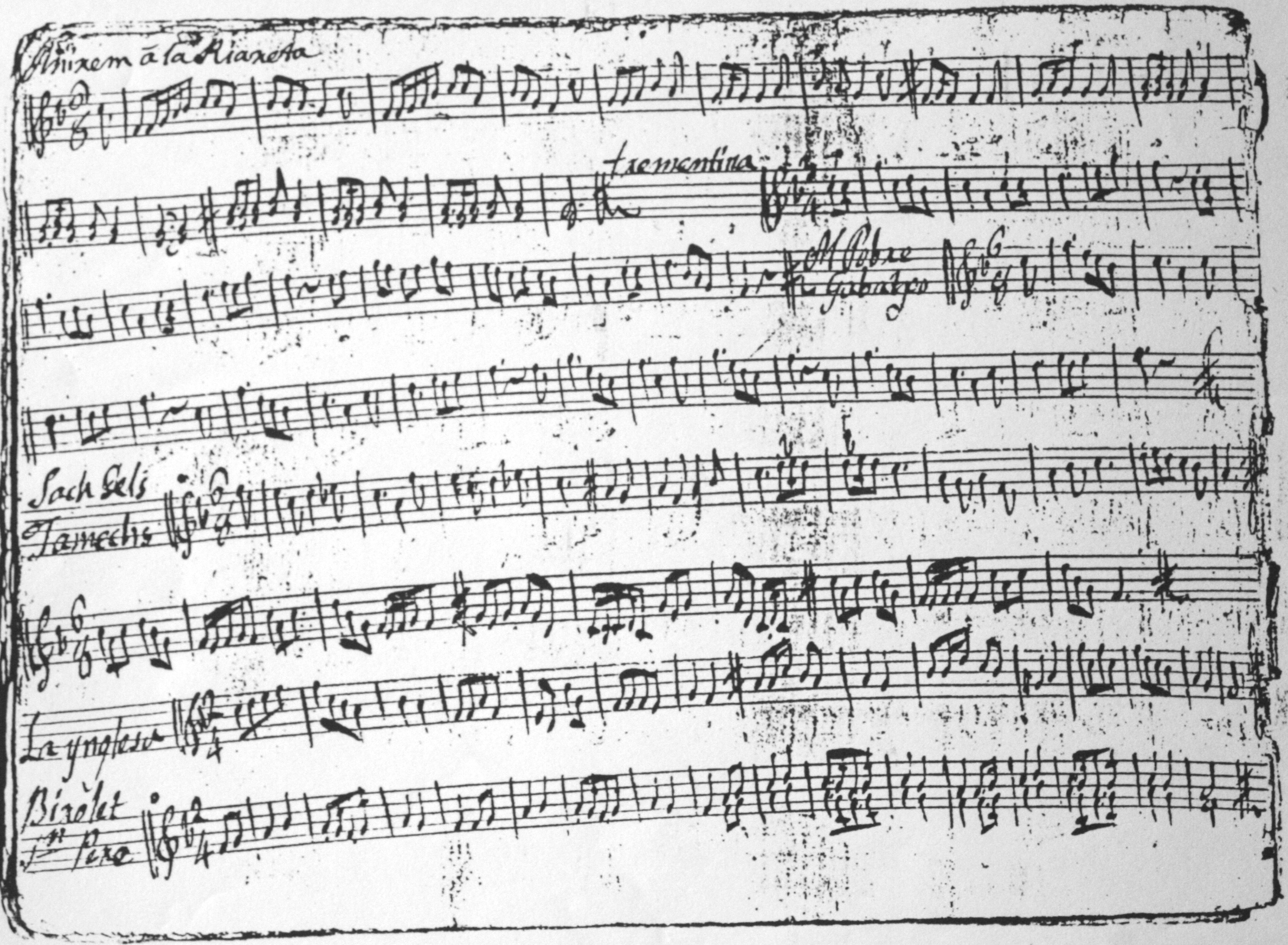
Traditional Catalan folksong and sac de gemecs melody from an 1822 manuscript

The sac de gemecs (Catalan pronunciation: [ˈsaɡ də ʒəˈmeks]; literally "bag of moans", also known as buna [ˈbuna] in Andorra or coixinera [kuʃiˈneɾə], gaita [ˈɡajtə] or botella [buˈteʎə]) is a type of bagpipes found in Catalonia (eastern Spain spilling over into southern France).

The instrument consists of a chanter, a mouthblown blowpipe, and three drones. The lowest drone (bordó llarg) plays a note two octaves below the tonic of the chanter. The middle drone (bordó mitjà) plays a fifth above the bass. The high drone (bordó petit) plays an octave below the chanter, thus one octave above the bass drone.

== Folklore ==
The instrument figures into the Andorran legend El buner d'Ordino, in which a bagpiper from the parish of Ordino, en route to a festival in Canillo, is chased and treed by wolves, but frightens them off by playing his buna.

== See also ==
- Xeremia
- Gaita
