= Xeremia =

Bagpipe from Mallorca

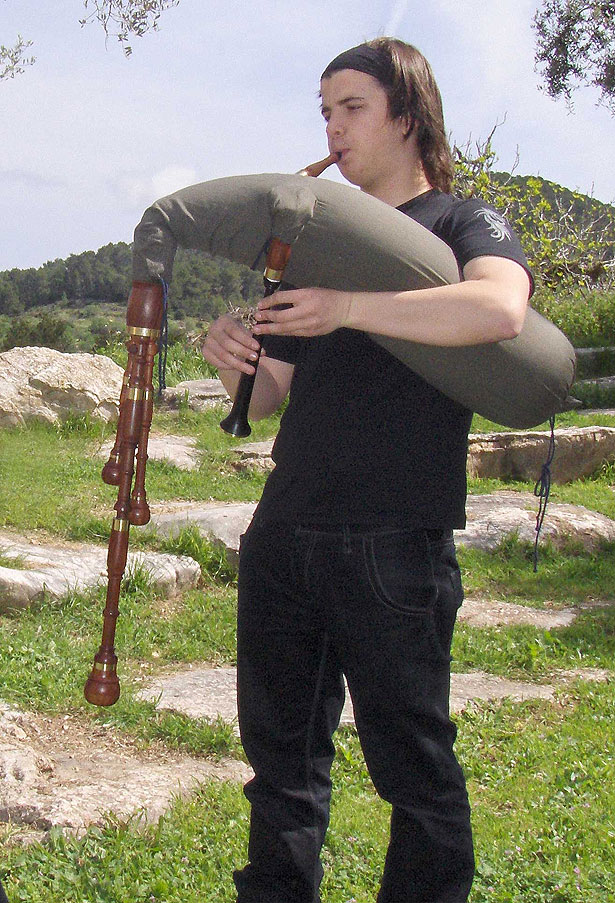
Xeremia

The xeremia (Catalan pronunciation: [ʃəɾəˈmi.ə], plural xeremies) is a type of bagpipe native to the island of Mallorca (Mallorca). It consists of a bag made of skin (or modern synthetic materials), known as a sac or sarró which retains the air, a blowpipe (bufador), a melody pipe or chanter (grall), and several, generally three, drones (bordons). The primary drone (roncó) sounds a tonic note, but the other drones are sometimes simply false drones for ornamentation.

The xeremia has a distinctively bright and piercing sound, which has traditionally accompanied festivals and other activities in the islands throughout history.

== Name ==
The name xeremia is of French origin. The Old French word chalemie over time became charemie. This is related to the influence of Occitania during the Kingdom of Aragon, as Catalan was quite strong from the year 531 to approximately 1131, as the Occitan cultural centre expanded through the means of minstrels and bards, throughout the territory that would later be known as Catalonia.

The instrument's name may be used in the singular or in the plural and has several variants, depending on the location. In Ibiza the instrument exists only without a bag, but is called also Xeremia. In the Balearic Islands it is called xeremia, xirimia, xeremies or xirimies while in Catalonia it is known as sac de gemecs.

== History ==
The first reliable evidence of bagpipes in the Iberian Peninsula dates to the Middle Ages. The first written reference dates to the 9th century, in a letter from Saint Jerome to Dardanus:

"The chorus is a simple leather hide with two brass tubes. The player blows into one, and the chorus emits the sound through the other".

The influence of the court of Aragon and particularly that of Catalonia in the Balearic Islands and the cultural exchanges on both sides of the Pyrenees together with Catalan hegemony in Occitania, which had been a strong cultural center, caused an increase in the number of bards and minstrels. In 1209 there was a massive migration of bards and minstrels fleeing Occitania, due to repression by the northern French monarchs, encouraged by Pope Innocent III. Bagpipes became prominent in those areas where the courts of Aragon and Catalonia had influence.

When James I the Conqueror, conquered Mallorca and Ibiza and repopulated those lands with his vassals of Catalan origin, they brought the bagpipes with them: the sac de gemecs, from which the Mallorcan xeremia (xeremia mallorquina) is derived.

In the archive of the Crown of Aragon there is a document from the year 1343 that names one "Joan Mascum, bagpipe minstrel to the king, from Majorca" in reference to king James III. Further, it is known that the minstrels of the king of Mallorca brought to the court of Peter IV the ceremonial playing of the bagpipe through the city of Tortosa in the year 1353. There are further reports that bagpipers from a variety of nations would congregate, especially during Lent.

Similar pipes are attested in Barcelona as early as 1119, and in Valencia in 1258. Reports state that a procession of Saint Dionysius contained "two trumpeters, two tabalers, and bagpipe." After 1335, there are frequent mentions of the xeremia in records. Following this period, the pipes became even more widespread, becoming popular among shepherds and beggars, although in a primitive form.

During the reign of Alfonso V of Aragon and IV of Catalonia, called The Magnanimous the instrument spread, along with other cultural trappings, to the kingdom's possessions in the Mediterranean. Reports from 1420 indicate that the court of Naples included players of the xalamies.

It is in the 19th century that the instrument was modified, becoming more like the xeremia we know today. The evolution of other instruments had marginalized the bagpipes, whose range was only a single octave. As it was difficult to modernize the pipes, they remained a simple and primitive instrument. Though it faded from popularity in other Catalan territories, this was not the case of the Balearic Islands where isolation and a predominantly rural population preserved the instrument within the culture. The xeremia, close relative of the sac de gemecs, maintains its popularity in the culture of the Baleares even as native bagpiping traditions across Europe went into decline. At the end of the 20th century, several folkloric and cultural groups were working for the instrument's continued survival and expansion.

The evolution of the xeremia may be divided into two periods. Between the 12th and 16th centuries conviven instrumentos con "trompa" o sin ella. From the 16th century onwards its form resembled that of the modern variant, with the drones atop the instrument. The direct relation between this pipe and the sac de gemecs is still reflected in that the only major difference between the two pipes is that all the drones of the sac de gemecs sound, whereas two of the three xeremia drones are often dummy drones for aesthetic purposes, with only one of the three actually functional.

== La cobla ==
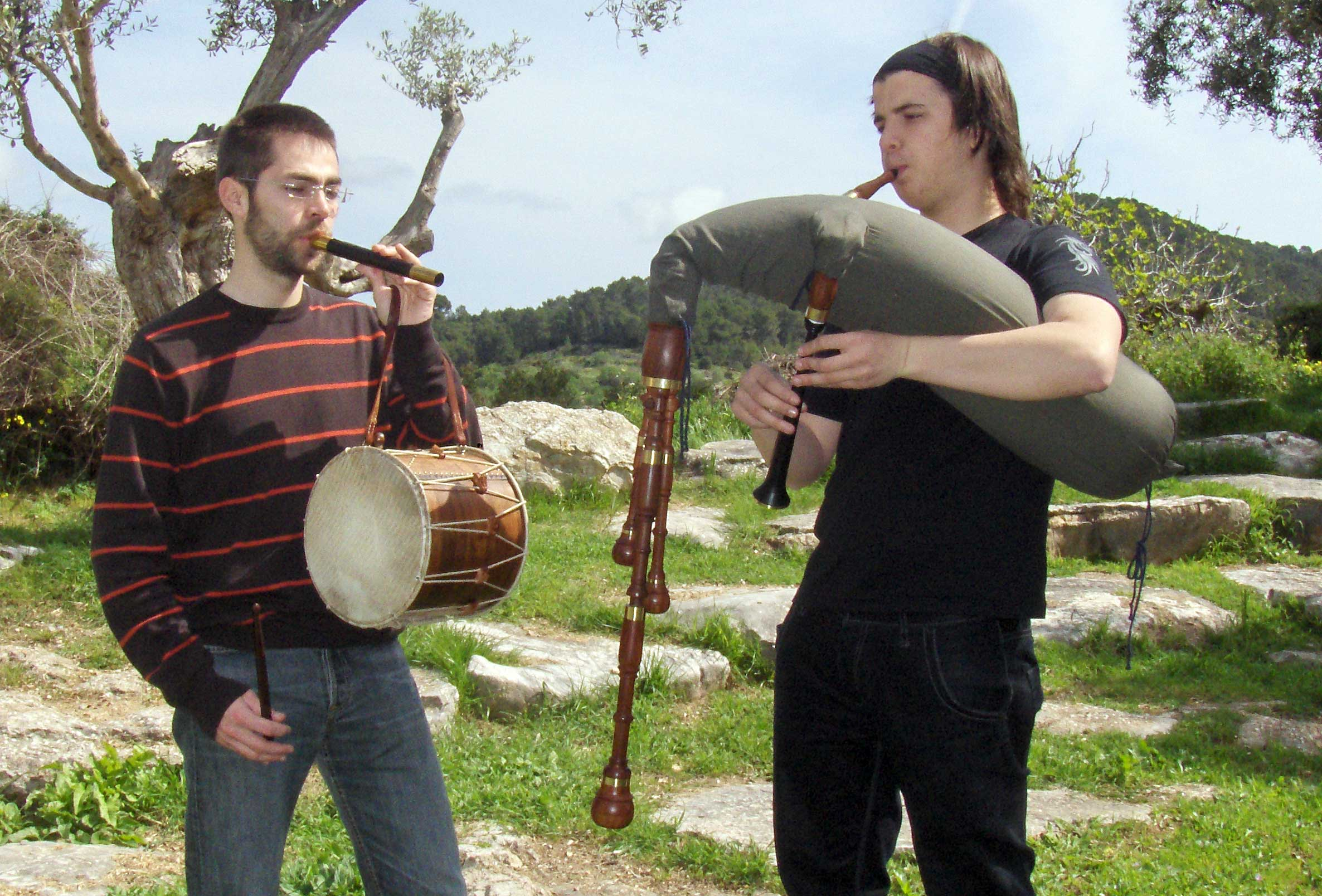
Colla (group) formed by xeremier and flabioler

The xeremia is generally played within an ensemble known as the cobla de tres quartans, known popularly through the Ses Xeremies. In actuality, this ensemble is usually abbreviated to a mitja cobla ("half cobla") or colla consisting of only a xeremia and a flabiol (regional tabor pipe) and tambor or tamboret (drum).

Coblas may take the form of:

- Mitja cobla, or media cobla ("half cobla"): these are composed of one xeremia and one flabiol with tambor (drum). This form of cobla is very popular in the Balearic Islands and Catalonia. The xeremia and flabiol play the melody in unison with the flabiol accompanying himself on the drum.
- Tres quartans de cobla, or tres cuartos de cobla ("three-quarter cobla"): composed of a sac de gemecs, tarota, a flabiol and a tamboret played by three musicians (as the flabiol and tamboril are played by the same musician), thus the term "three-quarter", which appears to have its origins amongst medieval minstrel groups. En el siglo XVIII las coblas de ministrils were formed with a flabiol and drum, tarota, and a xeremia, and had an important role in popular festivals. The drum established the rhythm, the bagpipe played the melody and drones, the flabiol copied the melody, and the tarota played a similar melody an octave lower than the pipes and flabiol.

== Repertoire ==
Given the long history of the instrument, the repertoire of the xeremia is likewise wide, even more so in the context of the colla.

There are two distinct periods of xeremia repertoire: during the first transmission of tunes was "closed", with each pair of pipers maintaining a fixed repertoire and without introducing new pieces, which also impeded other pipers from adopting their own, to the degree that pipers would refuse to play in front of other collas, in order to prevent their songs from being copied. This period caused the wide divergence of musical styles between communities of pipers. The second period is defined by the diffusion and learning of these same tunes.

There are pieces documented shortly following the conquest of the island by the kingdom of Aragón such as the danzas de los cossiers de Montuïri, Algaida, Manacor and Pollença or the Cavallets danced in Felanitx, Pollença and Artà. There are also the dances of Sant Joan Pelós (or Sant Joan Pelut), the Moratons, the Indis and the Balls de Cintes, these last of which have almost disappeared. Along with these, there are other tunes such as jotas and boleros such as pasodobles, rumbas, waltzes, etc.

== Cultural aspects ==
The term "xeremia" has a role in the popular speech of Majorca. Several phrases and proverbs refer to the instrument:

- Content com unes xeremies - Happy as a bagpipe
- Plorar com unes xeremies - To cry like a bagpipe
- Dits, dits, que vent no en falta - Fingers, fingers, may you not lack for wind
- Riure-se'n des Sant i ses xeremies - To laugh at the saint and the bagpipe
- Més inflat que unes xeremies - More swollen than a bagpipe
