= Biella Nuei =

- Origin: Zaragoza, Aragón, Spain
- Genres: Folk
- Years active: 1980s–present
- Website: www.biellanuei.com

Biella Nuei is a Spanish folk music group from Aragón. Their repertoire consists of songs performed in Spanish and Aragonese.

== Discography ==
- Las Aves y las Flores (1994)
- Solombra (1998)
- Sol d'ibierno (2006)
- Romper el muro (2011)
