= Trompa de Ribagorza =

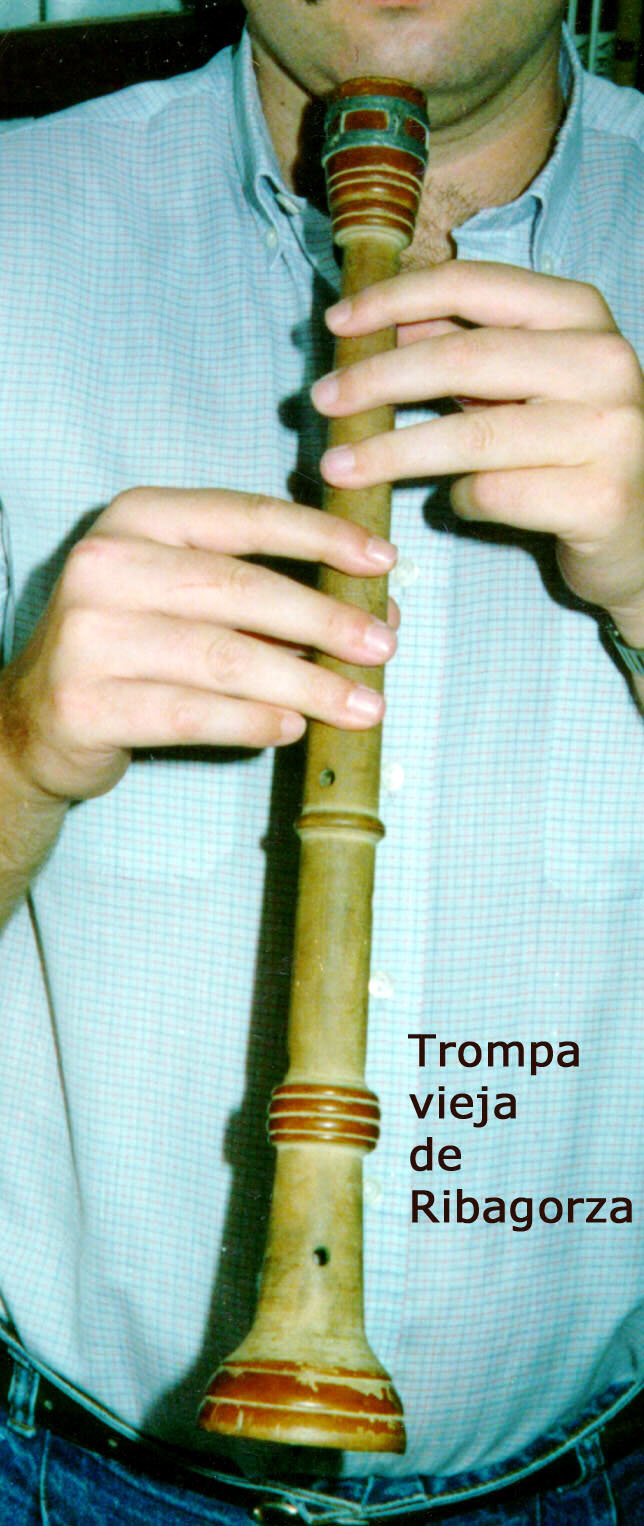
Trompa de Ribagorza.

The trompa de ribagorza is a double-reeded wind instrument, revived by Mariano Pascual based oi instruments preserved in Graus, similar to those used in the 19th century by the pipers of Caserras del Castillo and other areas in Baja Ribagorza Oriental.

== Sources ==
- Trompa de Ribagorza at Arafolk.net
