= Spanish Gothic architecture =

Late Medieval Spanish architecture

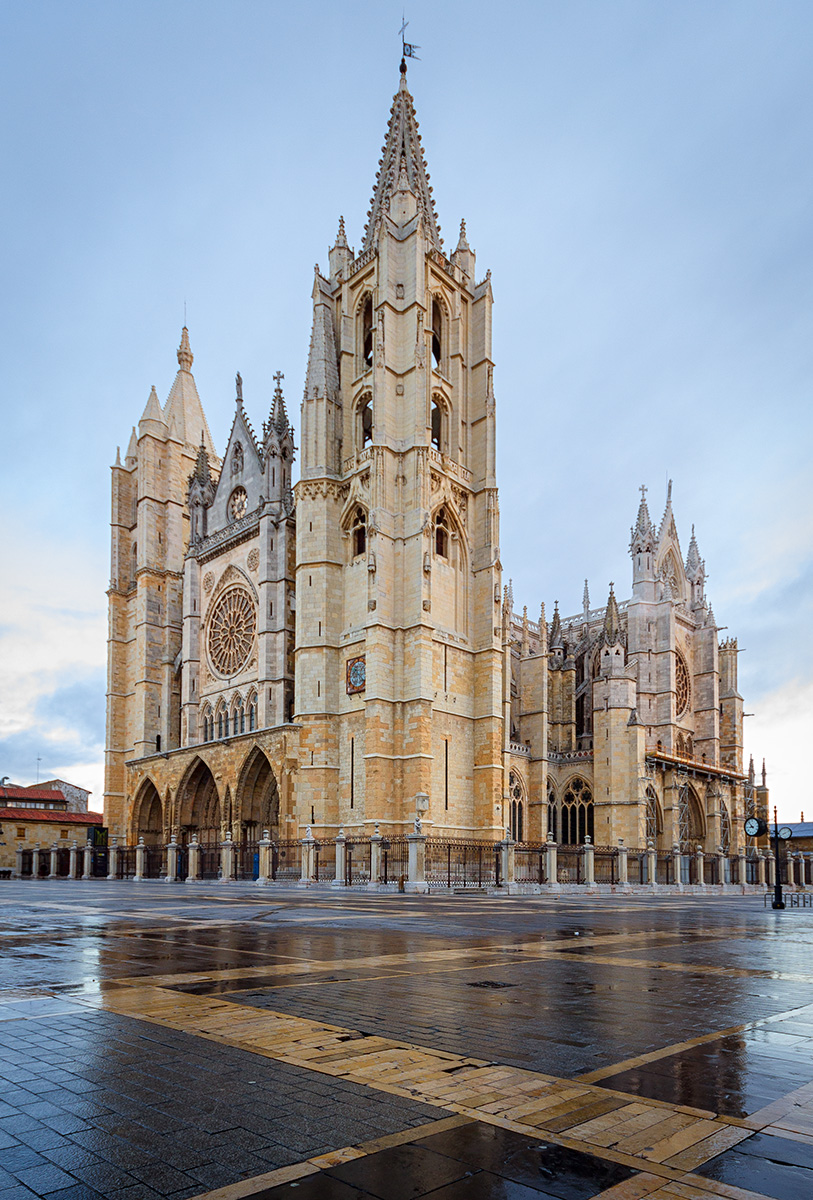
León Cathedral, a fine example of Gothic architecture in Spain

Spanish Gothic architecture is the style of architecture prevalent in Spain in the Late Medieval period.

The Gothic style started in Spain as a result of Central European influence in the twelfth century when late Romanesque alternated with few expressions of pure Gothic architecture. The High Gothic arrives with all its strength via the pilgrimage route, the Way of St. James, in the thirteenth century. Some of the most pure Gothic cathedrals in Spain, closest related to the German and French Gothic, were built at this time.

In some cases the Gothic style was built and decorated with Mudéjar elements by Mudéjar craftsmen and Christian craftsmen influenced by them, creating a highly distinctive Gothic style unique to Spain and Portugal. Some noteworthy post−thirteenth-century Gothic styles in Spain are the Levantine Gothic, characterized by its structural achievements and the unification of space, and the Isabelline Gothic, under the Catholic Monarchs, that predicated a slow transition to Renaissance architecture. Gothic construction ended in Spain in the sixteenth century.

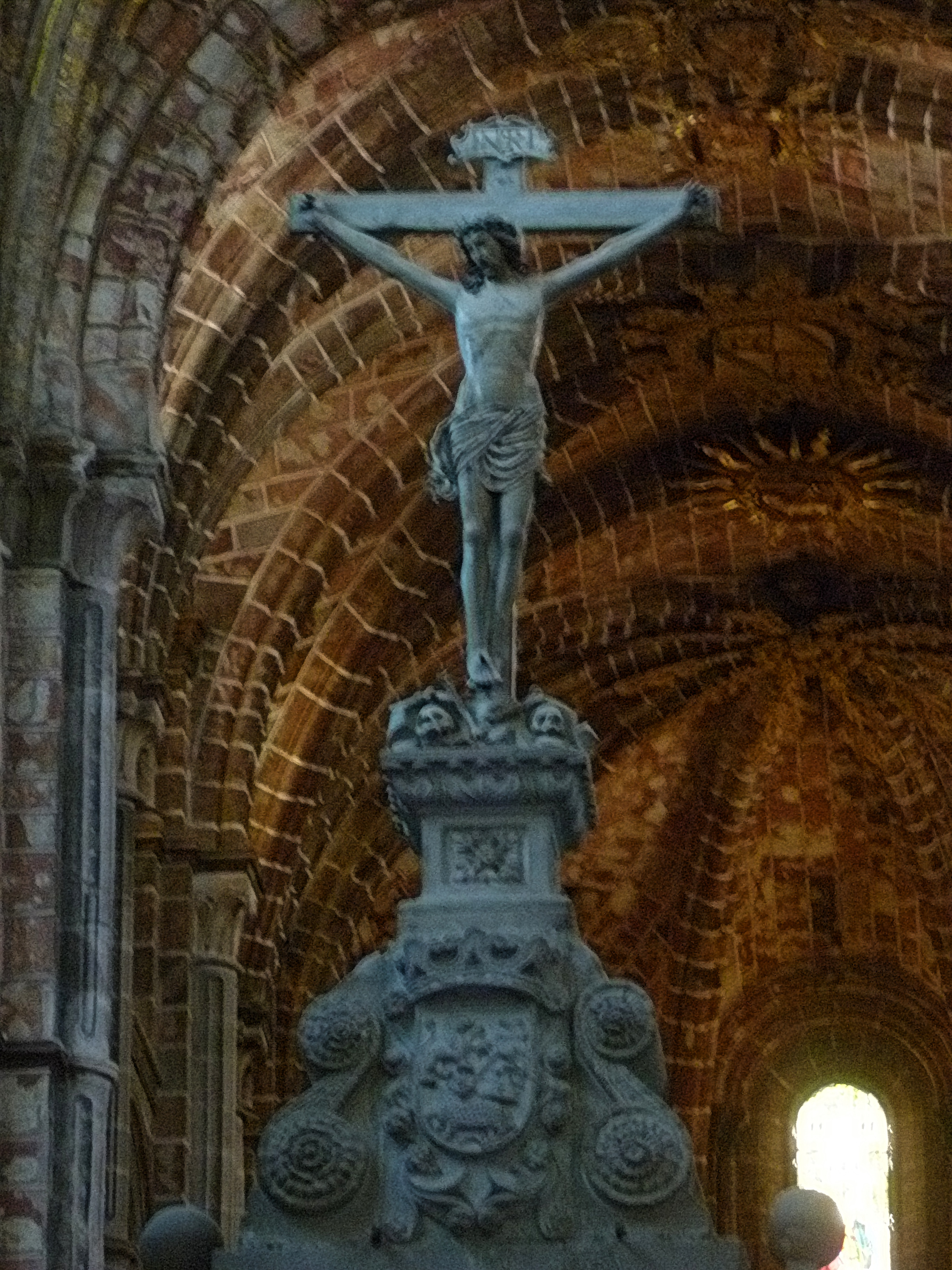
Radiating Chapels of Apse, Ávila Cathedral

In 1172, French architect Giral Fruchel designed the first ever Gothic cathedral in Spain. Ávila Cathedral, a cathedral located in Central Spain, represents a blend of the Romanesque and Gothic styles. Alfonso VIII, former King of the Castile Kingdom, was inspired by the Basilica St. Denis in France and wanted Ávila's plan to incorporate double ambulatory and radiating chapels. A double ambulatory consists of an apse that is surrounded by two walkways. Radiating chapels, are small, semicircular chapels that appear along the apse of a church. Alfonso's wish was granted, as Ávila Cathedral embodies these characteristics.

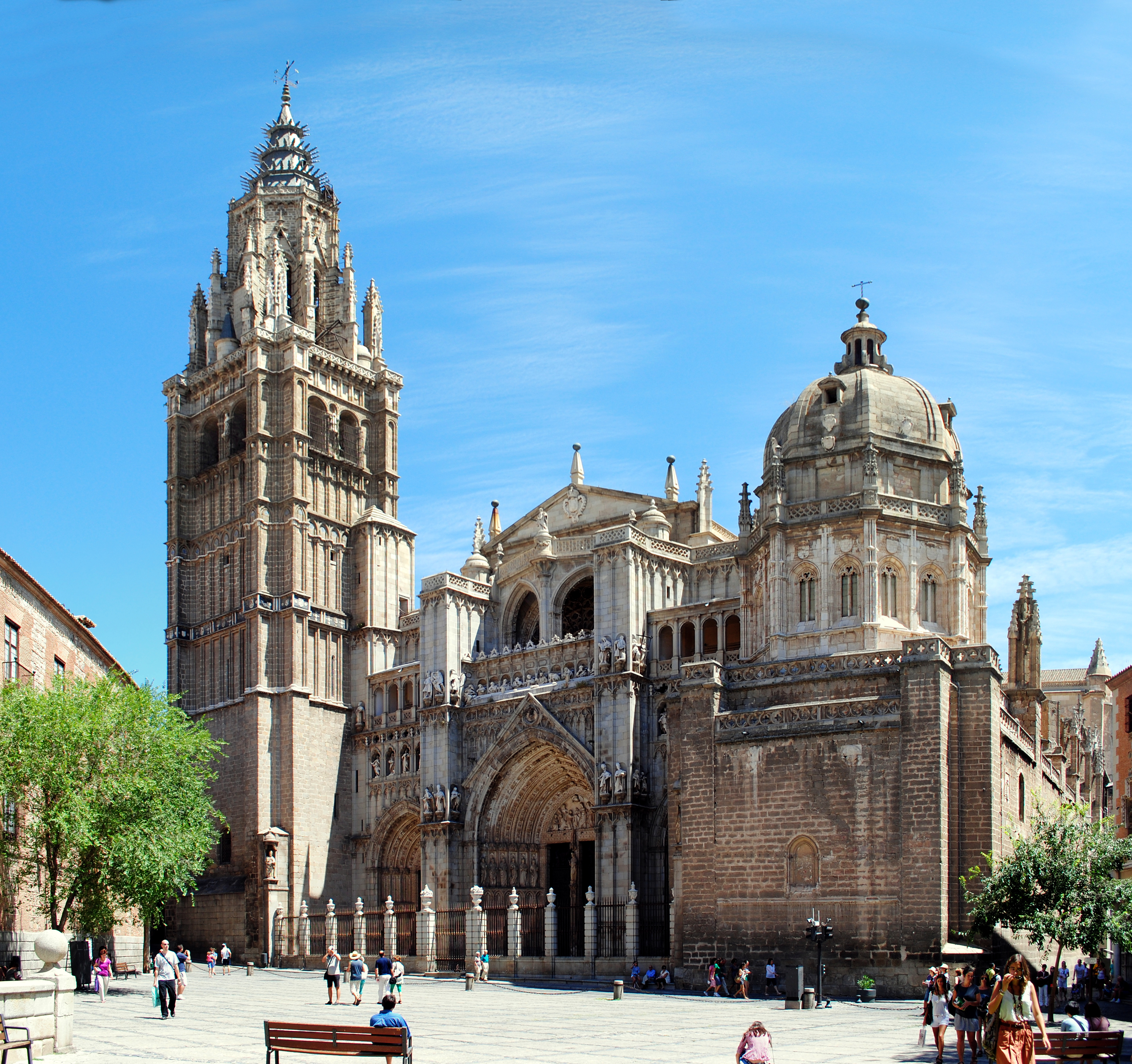
Toledo Cathedral

In 1227, Archbishop Rodrigo Jimenez de Rada initiated the rebuilding of the Toledo Cathedral in the Gothic style as well. Prior to this reconstruction, Toledo was under Muslim control and possessed Islamic architectural elements. Toledo's ground plan, for instance, resembled the ground plan of a mosque. The fusion of Islamic and French Gothic influences gave rise to a distinctive and uniquely Spanish Gothic architectural style, and Toledo Cathedral was among the first to exhibit this. Other physical attributes that Toledo Cathedral possesses are great bronze doors that make up the central portal of the building, plain vaults, double staggered aisles, and elaborate stonemasonry with colored marbles. Toledo is a monumental Gothic cathedral and represents architectural experimentation, as this was built during the upsurge of Gothic architecture in Spain.

Similar to Toledo, Burgos Cathedral was constructed in the early thirteenth century, in 1221. Both Toledo and Burgos Cathedrals have been altered many times since their initial construction. However, Burgos Cathedral is still deemed a favorable example of High Gothic Spanish architectural style. This cathedral incorporates flying buttresses, clerestory windows, pier arches, and a rose window. In addition to this, the choir in Burgos Cathedral is located in the center of the nave. This was unique because most gothic cathedrals positioned the choir in between the nave and the altar. Burgos Cathedral also contains vaults that are slightly domical and diagonal ribs. These key attributes suggest that the architects of this structure were influenced by French Gothic architecture.

In the fourteenth century, Spain started to introduce ornate features in their Gothic structures. Catalonian architecture, architecture belonging to the Catalonian region in northeastern Spain, was seen as superior during this time due to their frequent use of design elements. The Chapel of Santa Ágata in the Royal Palace of Barcelona, constructed from 1303 to 1310, exhibits double windows, polished contours, and refined proportions. Similar to other Gothic cathedrals, the Chapel of Agueda displays stained glass windows as well as religious iconography. These features highlight the artistry of Spanish Gothic architecture that can still be seen in architectural design today. The Ace Hotel in Los Angeles is an example of Spanish Gothic influence in contemporary time.

== Key Spanish Gothic Architectural Elements ==
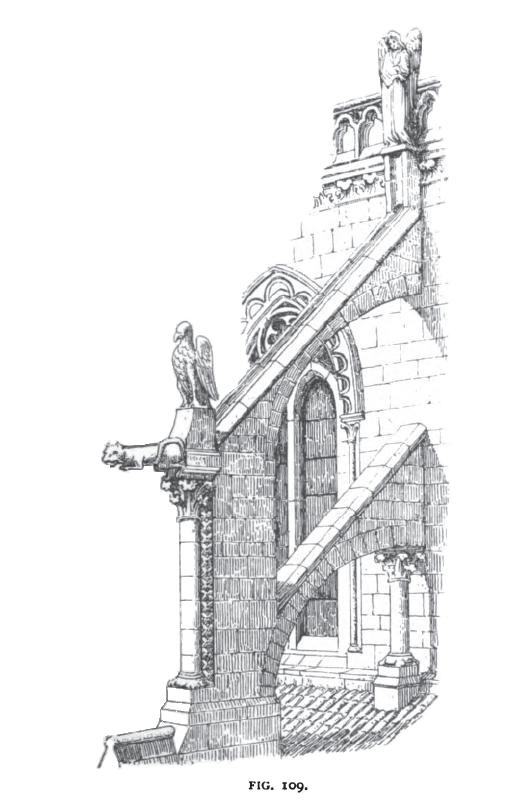
Flying Buttress and Clerestory of Burgos Cathedral

- nave
- aisles
  - double ambulatory
- flying buttresses
  - double flying buttresses
- Arches:
  - pointed arch
  - pier arches
- Vaults:
  - diamond vaults
  - cross-ribbed vaulting
- Windows:
  - clerestory windows
  - rose window
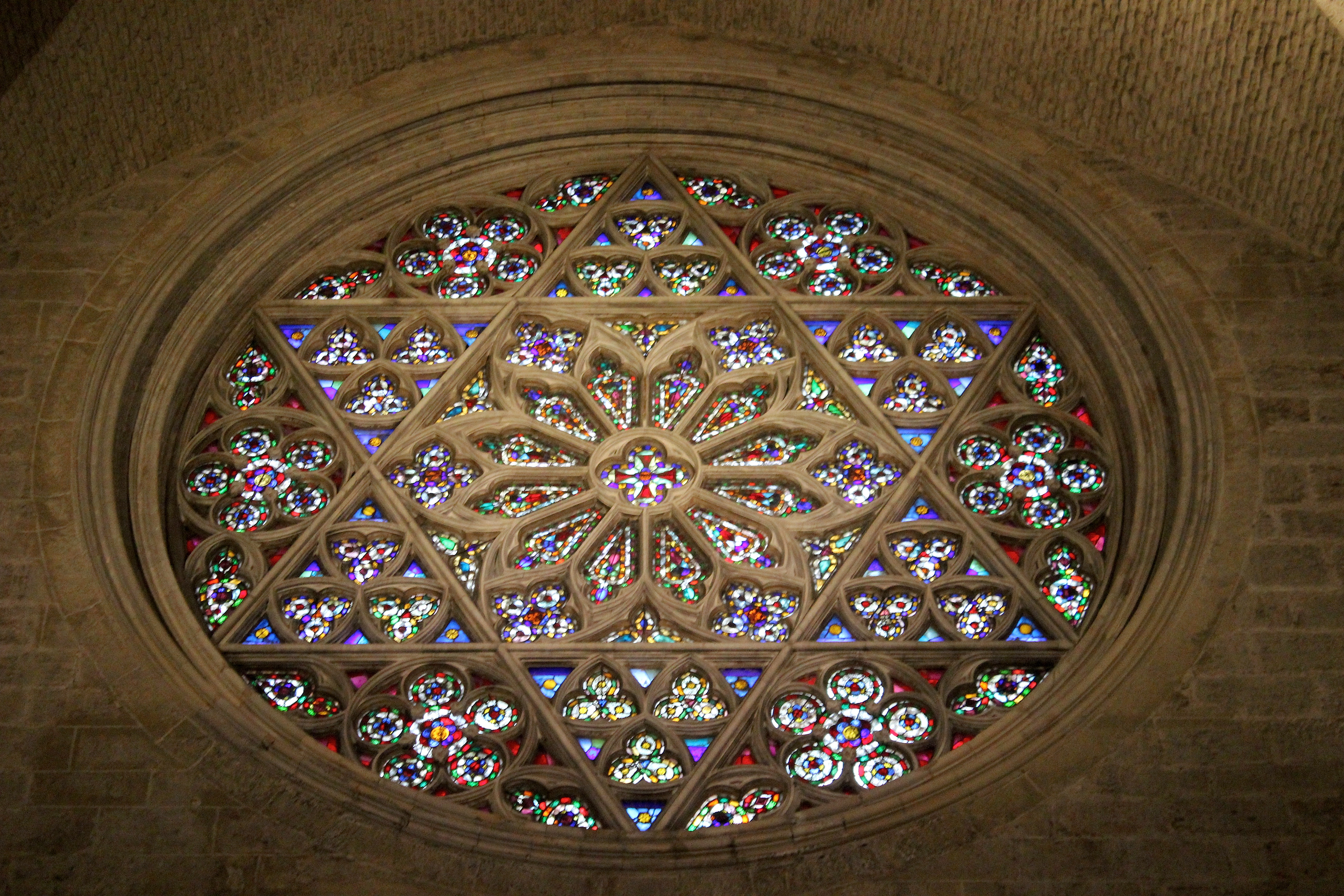
- Rose Window of Valencia Cathedral
  spare grey walls
- central lantern
- altar placed at western entrance
- radiating chapels
- tympanum
- gargoyles
- ornate attributes such as elegant molding

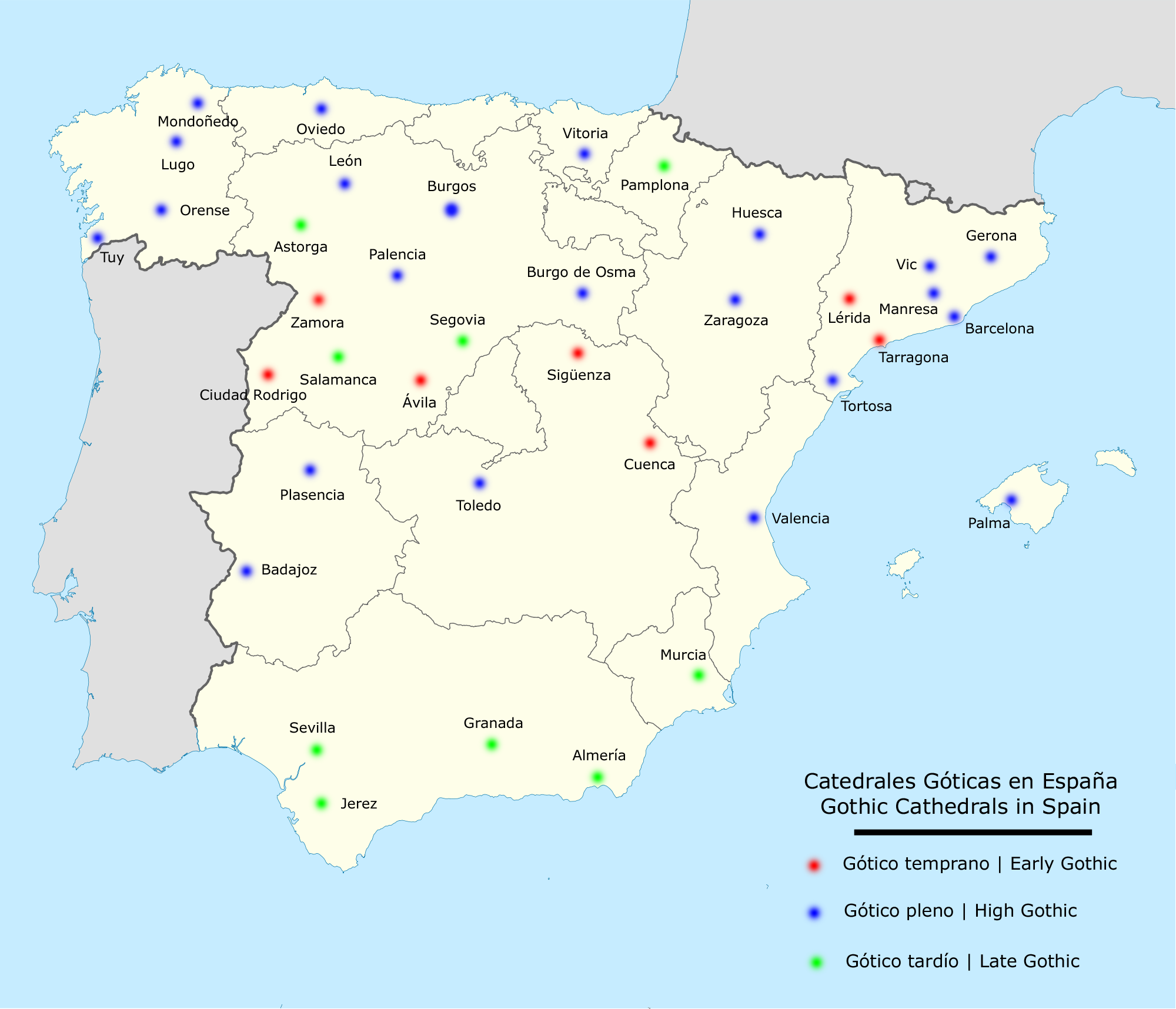
Ages of the main Gothic elements in many Spanish cathedrals.

== Styles of Spanish Gothic Architecture ==
=== Early Spanish Gothic ===
Early Spanish Gothic, flourishing in the 12th century, was largely a transitional style, and as such buildings in this style still retain a rather Romanesque character. Unlike Early French Gothic architecture, which used large windows and monumental towers to emphasise light and verticality, Early Spanish Gothic architecture is characterised instead by fewer windows and sprawling horizontal floor plans. The style also coincided with the peak of the Reconquista, and as such some Early Spanish Gothic churches also functioned as defensive military structures; as a result, they often lacked the ornamentation seen in the French equivalent.

- Cathedral of Ávila
- Cathedral of Cuenca (not including the entrance façade)
- Cathedral of Sigüenza
- Abbey of Santa María la Real de Las Huelgas in Burgos

=== High Spanish Gothic ===
High Spanish Gothic, flourishing in the 13th century, drew heavily from the concurrent Rayonnant Gothic style in France. As such, the High Spanish style exhibits many of the same features: large windows and intricate bar tracery are used to achieve a "luminous" effect. It primarily differs once again in its preference for sprawling horizontal floor plans over soaring towers; it also employs lavishly intricate ornamentation, often in the form of sculpture and Islamic-style geometric patterns.

- Cathedral of Burgos
- Cathedral of Burgo de Osma
- Cathedral of León
- Cathedral of Toledo
- Palace of the Kings of Navarre in Olite
- San Pablo Church, Valladolid

=== Mudéjar Gothic ===
Mudéjar Gothic, lasting from the 13th to the 15th century, is characterised by its unique blend of Gothic features with lavish and extensive Islamic ornamentation. This can be found in the use of horseshoe arches alongside the more typically Gothic pointed arch; the use of colorful ceramic tiles and stone tracery to create intricate geometric patterns; and the soaring towers characteristic of Mudéjar Gothic churches inspired by Islamic minarets.

- Cathedral of San Salvador, in Zaragoza
- Castillo de Coca in Coca
- St. Martín's Tower in Teruel

=== Levantine Gothic ===
Levantine Gothic, flourishing in the 14th and 15th centuries, refers to the style prevalent in the eastern Levante region of Spain, which lines the Mediterranean coast. Stylistic differences can be observed within each autonomous community, further dividing the Levantine Gothic style into Valencian, Catalan, and Balearic variants.

==== Valencian Gothic ====
- Valencia Cathedral
- Lonja de la Seda, in Valencia
- Torres de Serranos
- Palace of the Borgias
- Monastery of Sant Jeroni de Cotalba, in Alfauir.
- Monastery of Santa María de la Valldigna, in Simat de la Valldigna.
- Basilica of Santa Maria, in Alicante.
- Orihuela Cathedral, in Orihuela.
- Castelló Cathedral and El Fadrí, in Castellón de la Plana
- Segorbe Cathedral in Segorbe.

==== Catalan Gothic ====
- Santa Maria del Mar of Barcelona
- Barcelona Royal Shipyard
- Royal Palace in Barcelona
- Cathedral of Girona
- Santa Maria del Pi, Barcelona
- Monastery of Pedralbes

==== Balearic Gothic ====
- La Seu (cathedral) of Palma de Mallorca
- Ciutadella de Menorca Cathedral
- Royal Palace of La Almudaina
- Bellver Castle

=== Late Spanish Gothic ===
Late Spanish Gothic, prevalent in the 15th century, drew heavily from the concurrent Flamboyant Gothic style in France.

- Cathedral of Oviedo
- Cathedral of Sevilla
- Cathedral of Segovia
- Chapel of the Condestable, Cathedral of Burgos
- New Cathedral in Salamanca

=== Isabelline Gothic ===
- Monastery of San Juan de los Reyes in Toledo
- Royal Chapel of Granada in Granada
- Colegio de San Gregorio in Valladolid
- Palace of Infantado in Guadalajara
- Palace of Jabalquinto in Baeza, Jaén
- San Pablo Church in Valladolid

=== Modern Spanish Gothic ===
- Ace Hotel Los Angeles

== Gallery ==
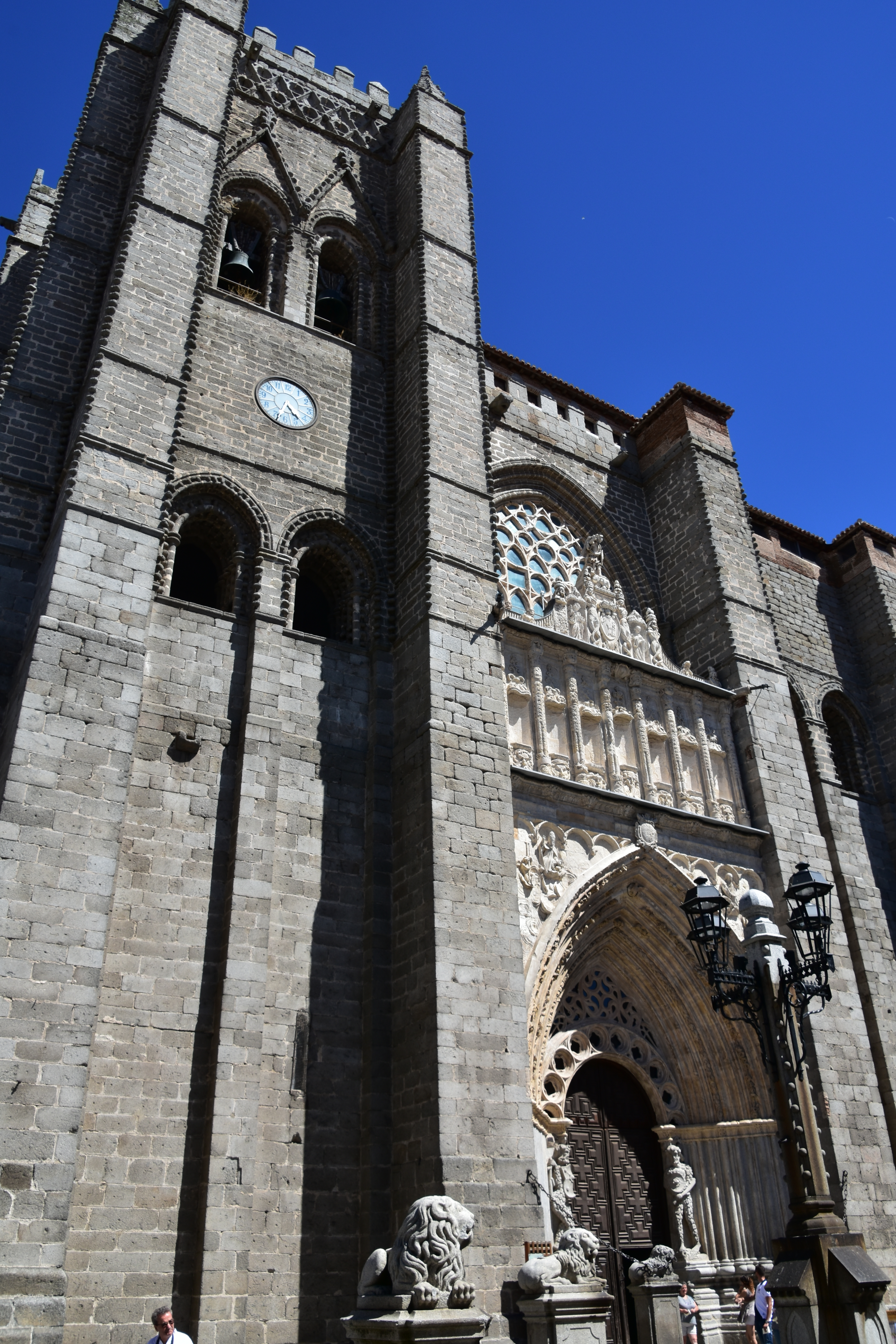
Ávila Cathedral, Exterior

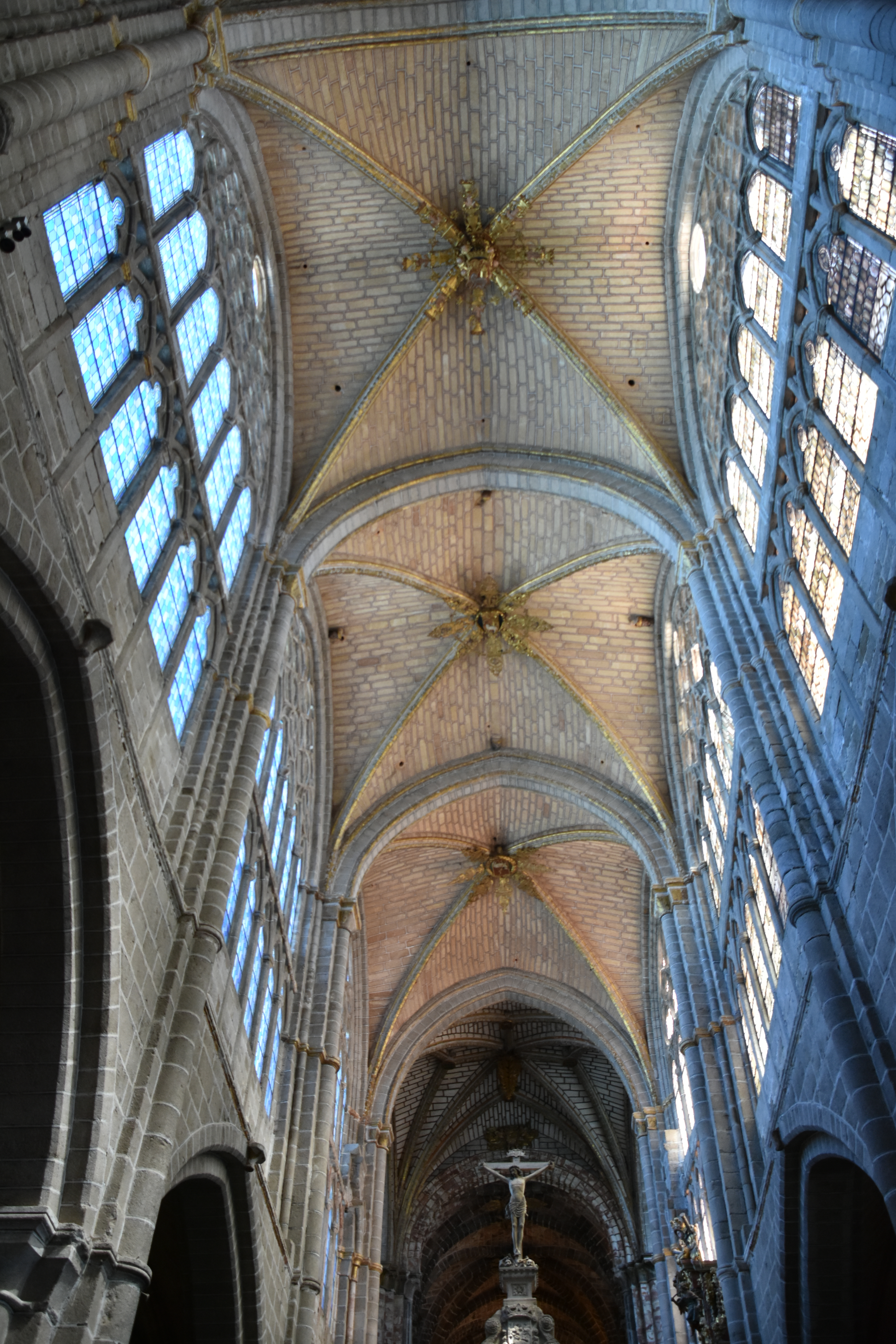
Ávila Cathedral, Interior

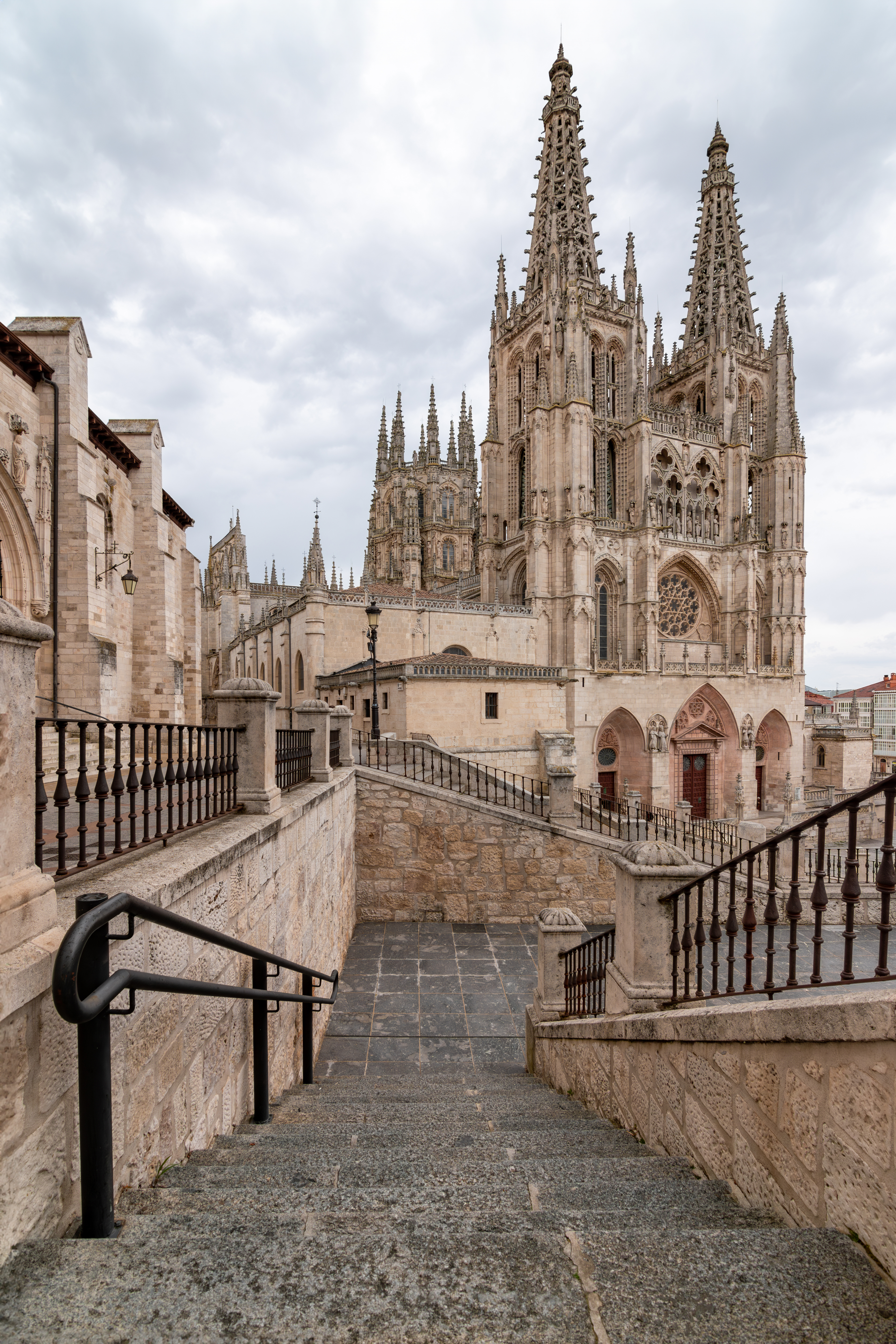
Burgos Cathedral

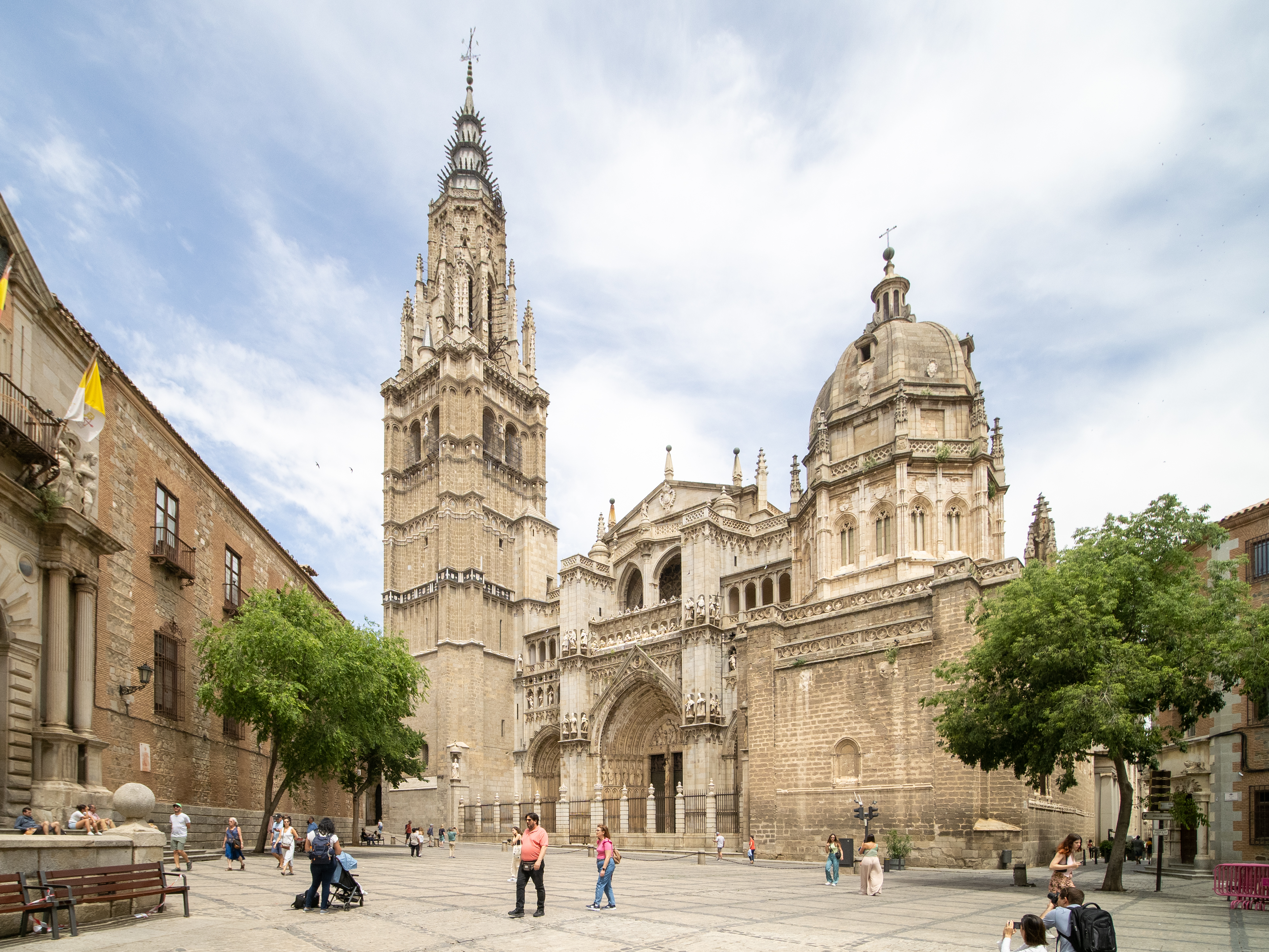
Toledo Cathedral, Exterior

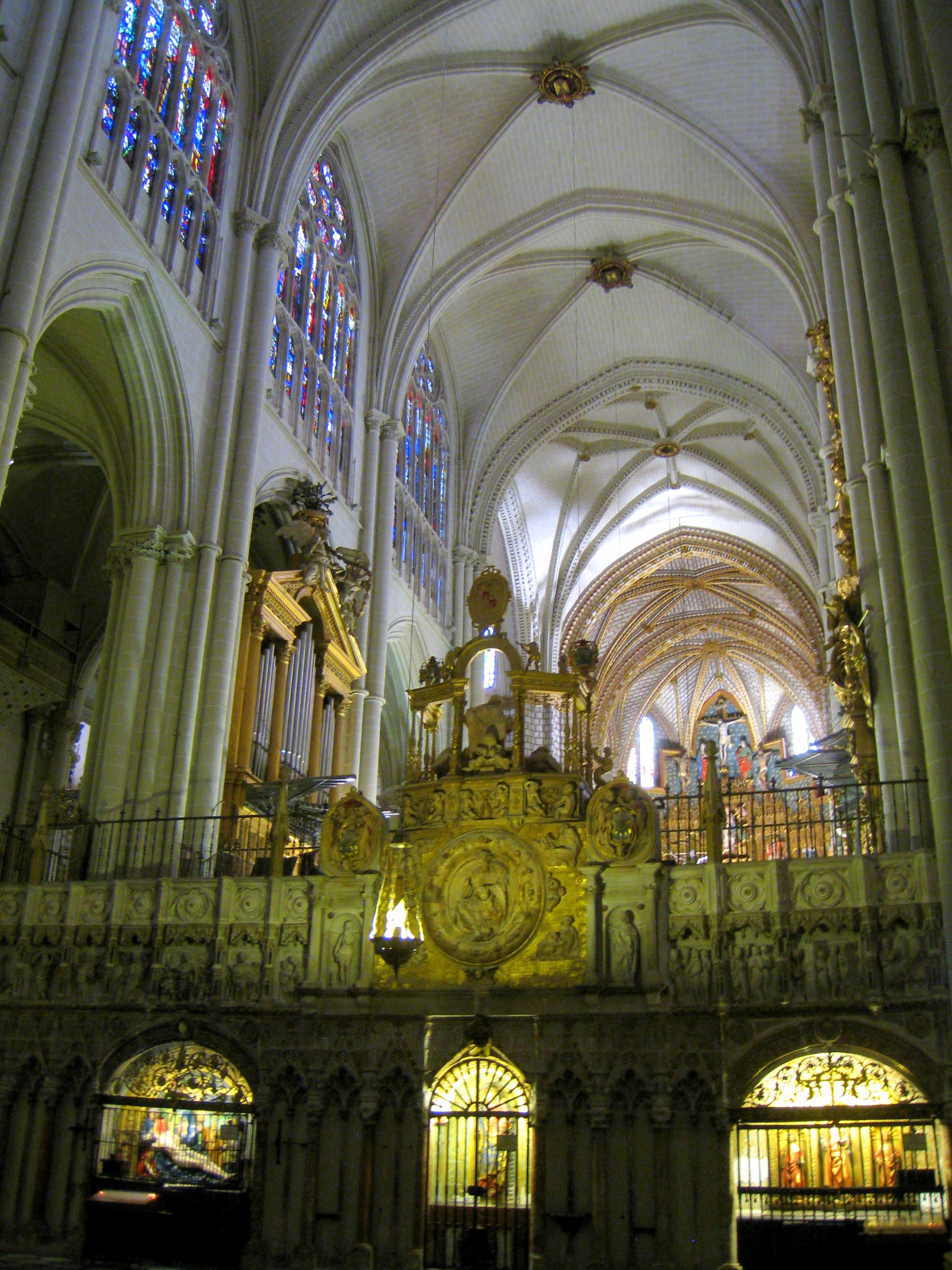
Toledo Cathedral, Interior

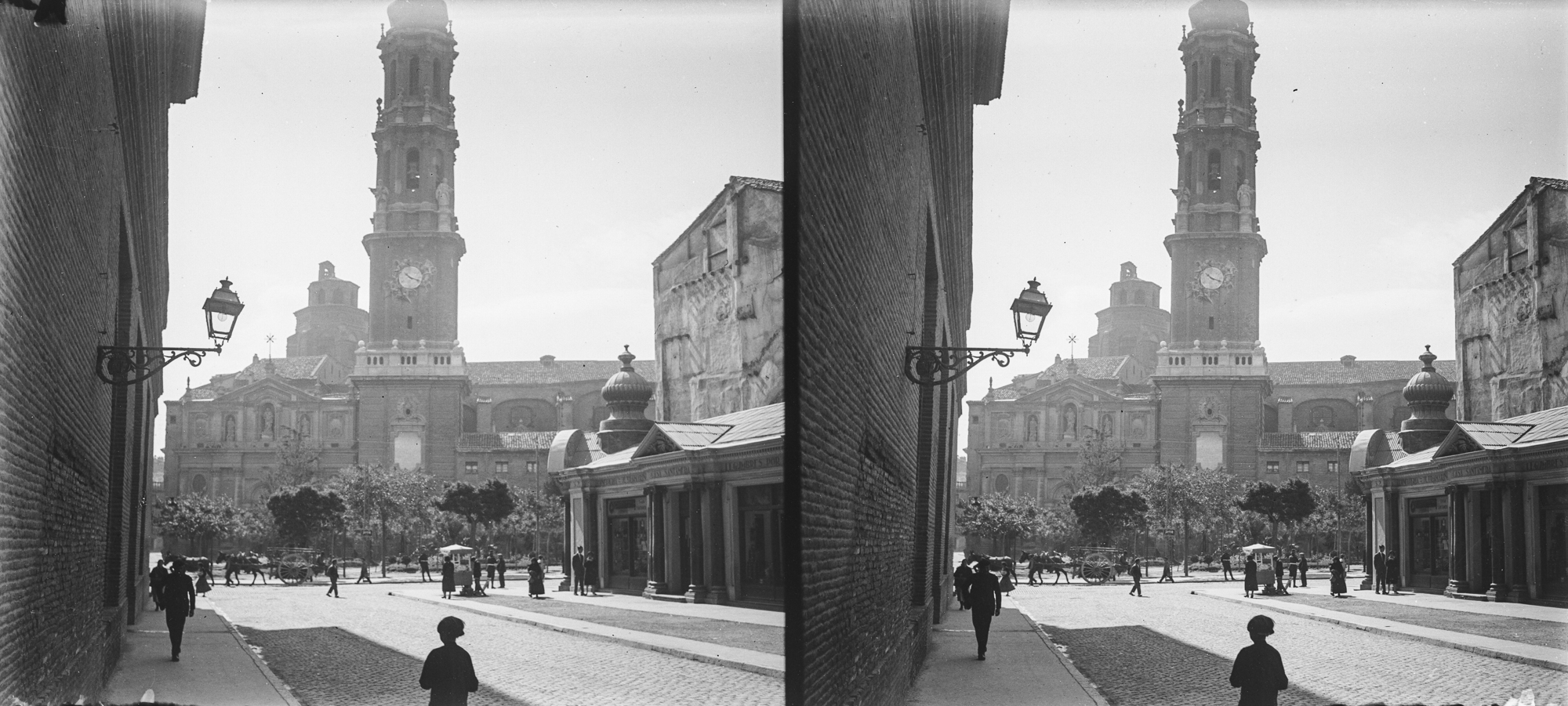
Cathedral of San Salvador, in Zaragoza

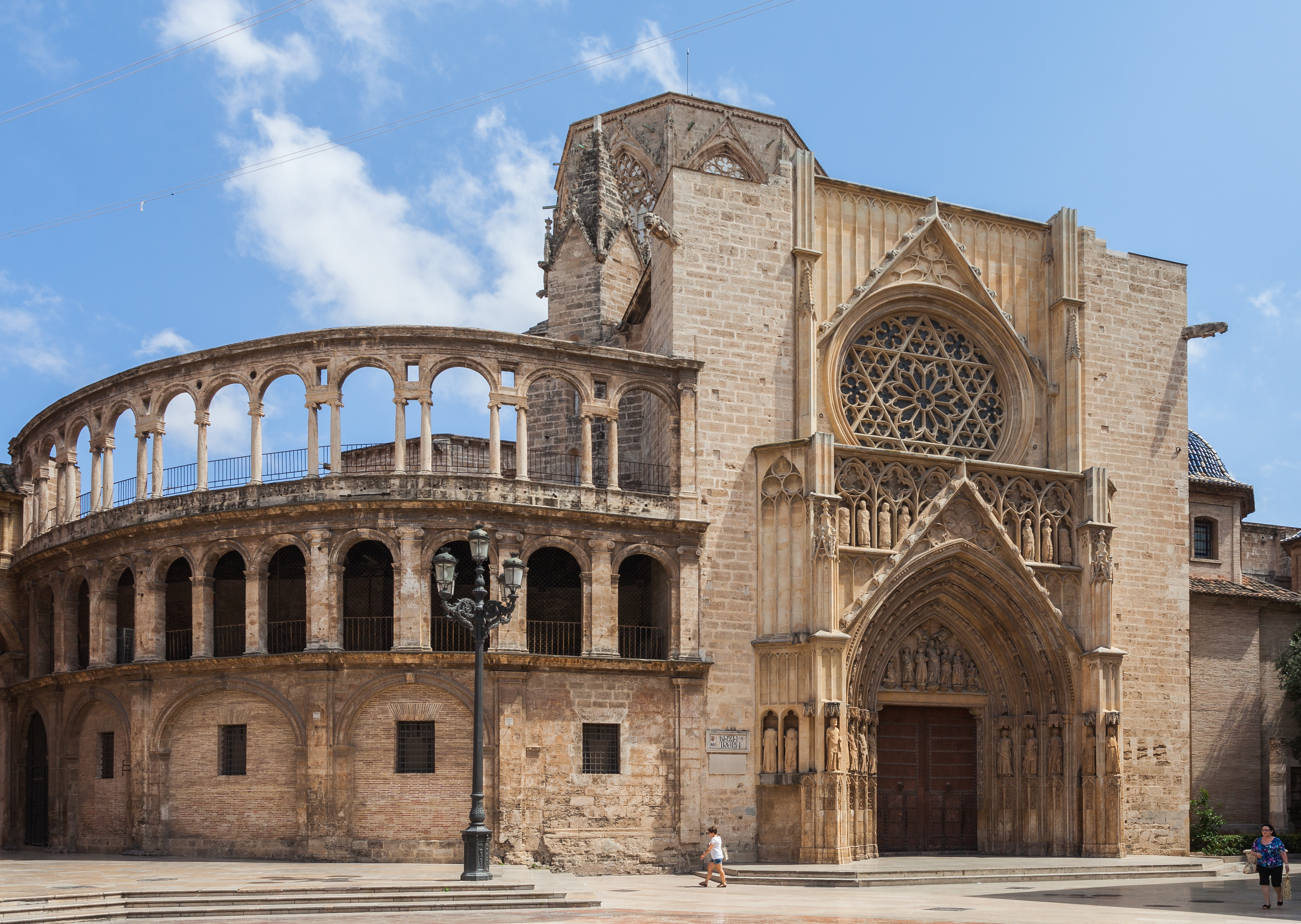
Valencia Cathedral, Exterior

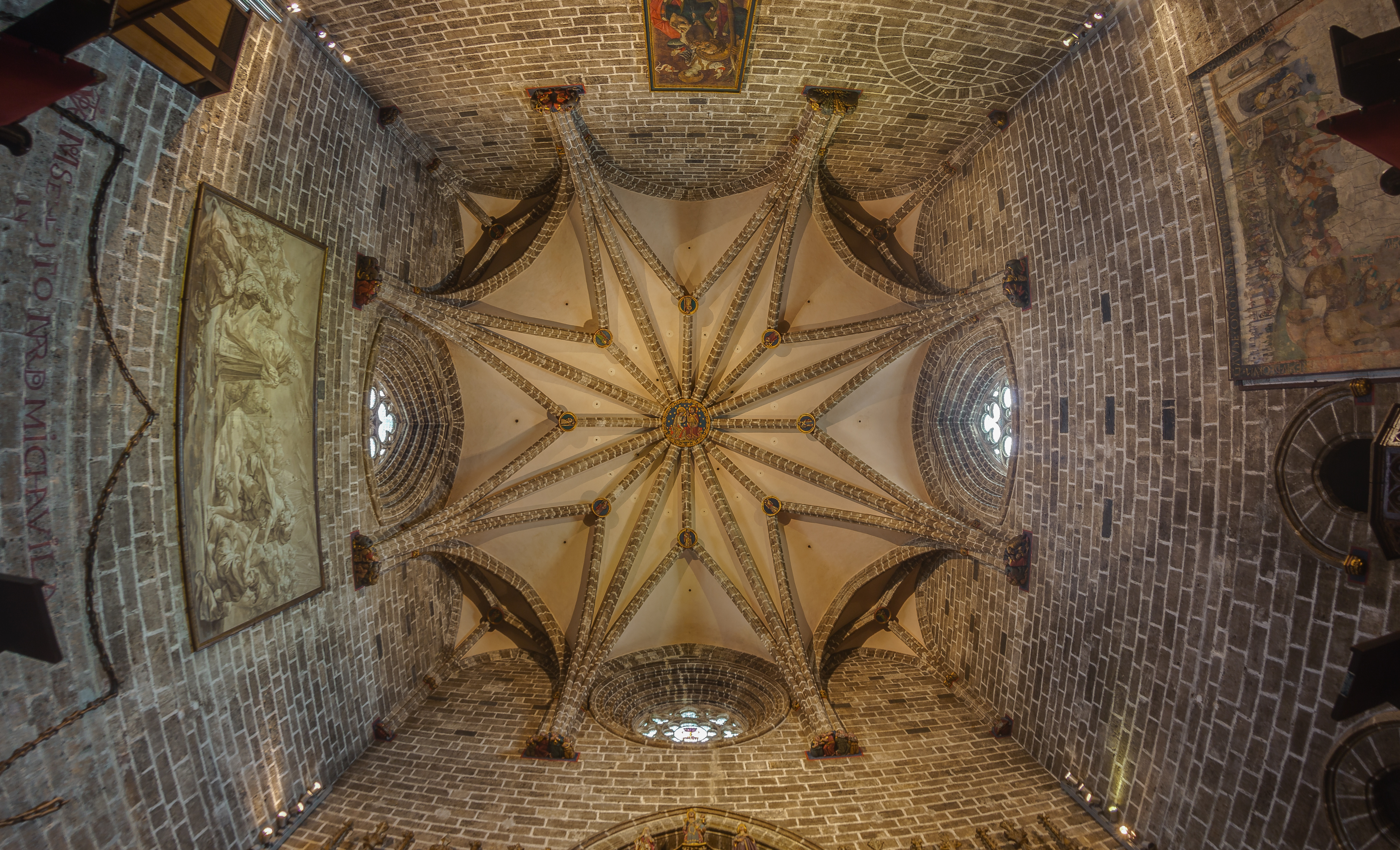
Valencia Cathedral, Interior

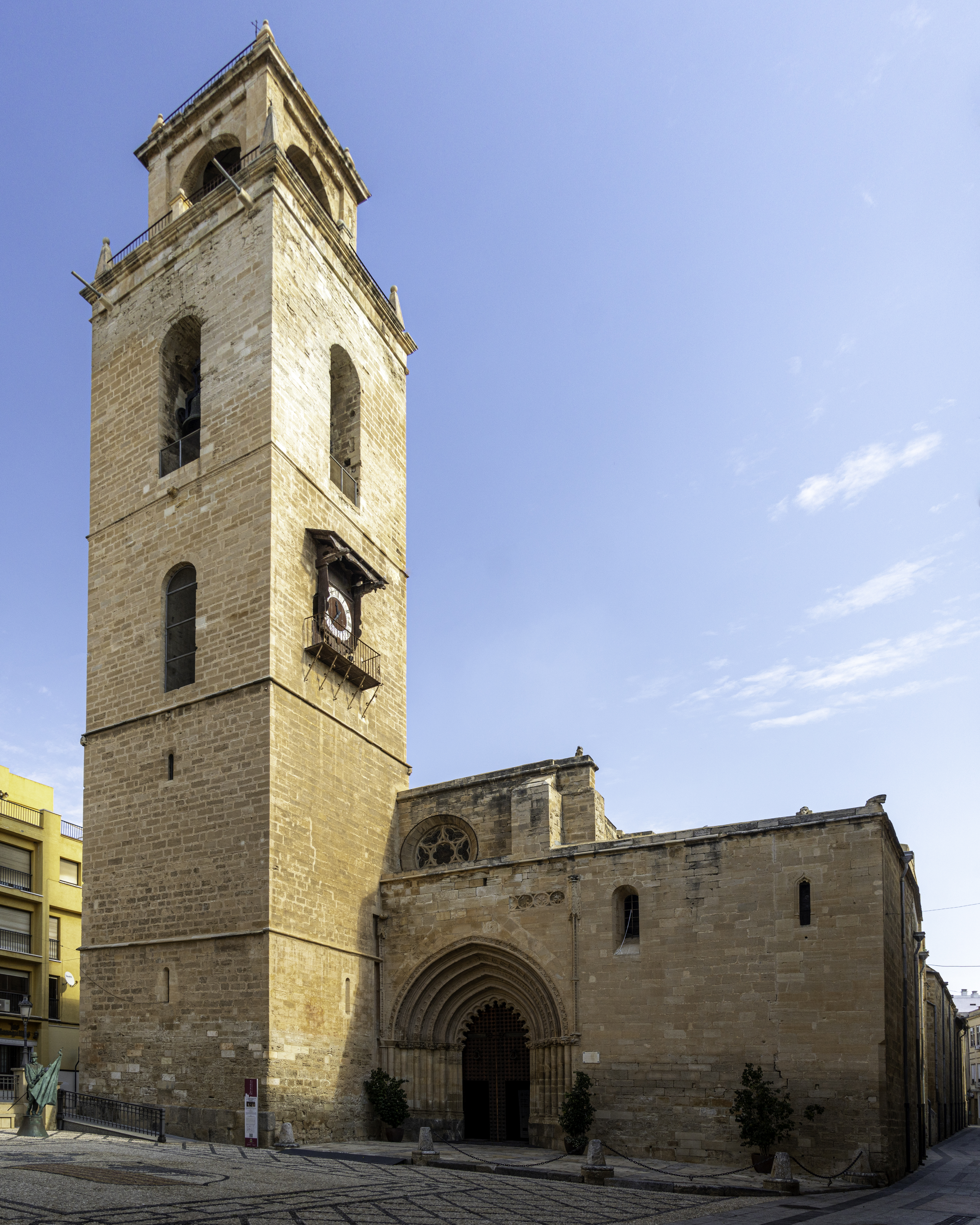
Orihuela Cathedral

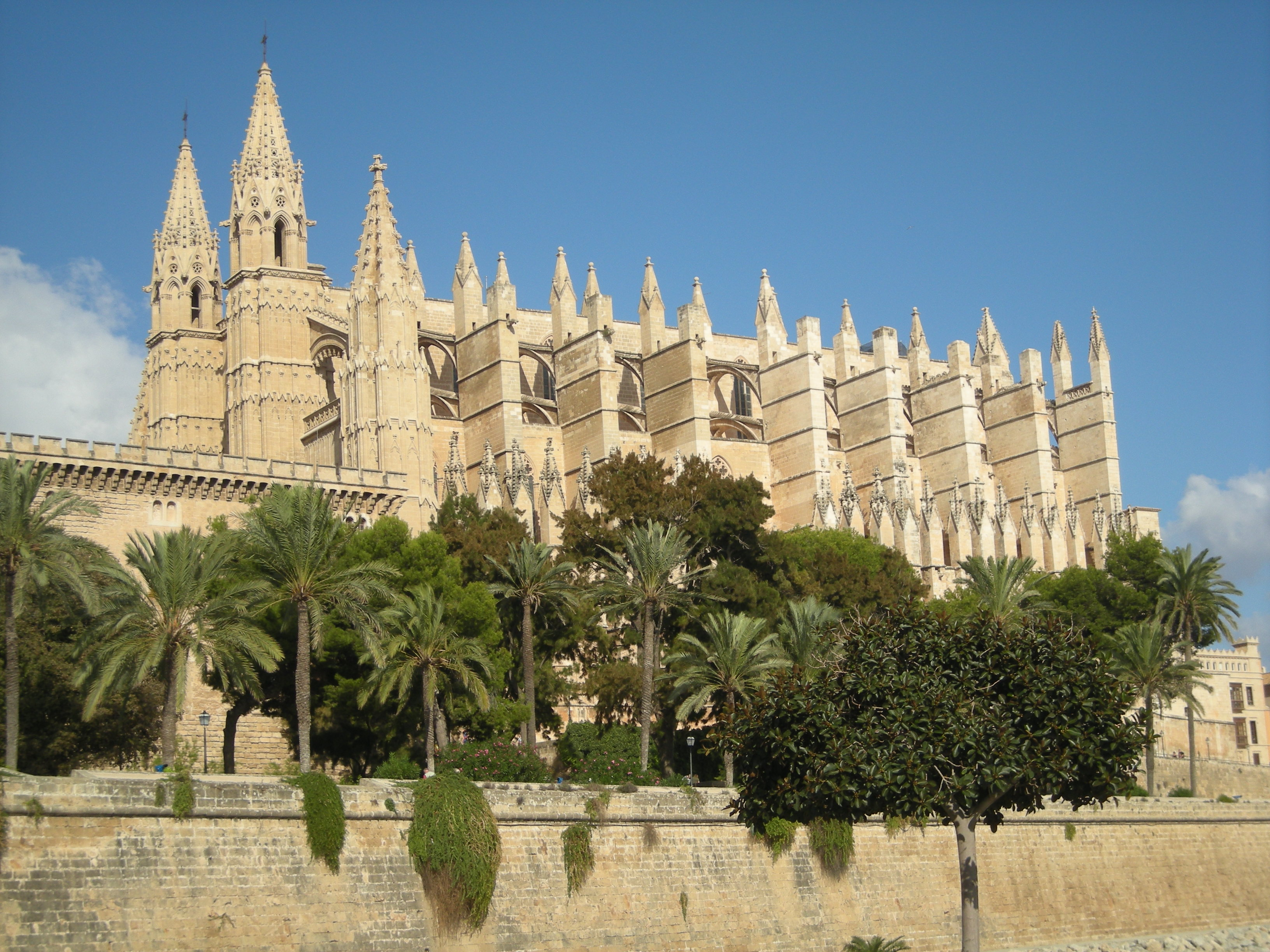
Palma Cathedral

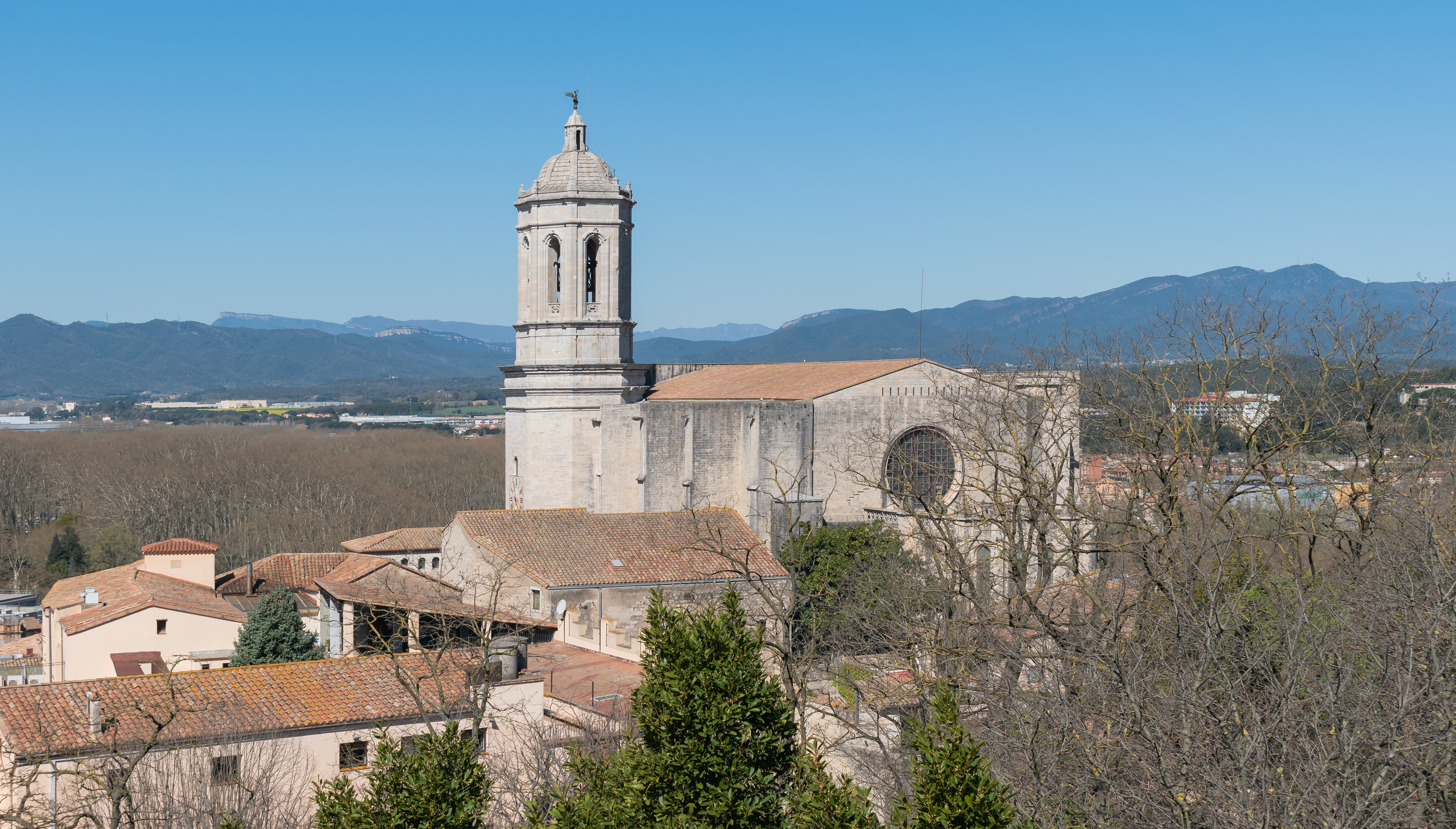
Girona Cathedral

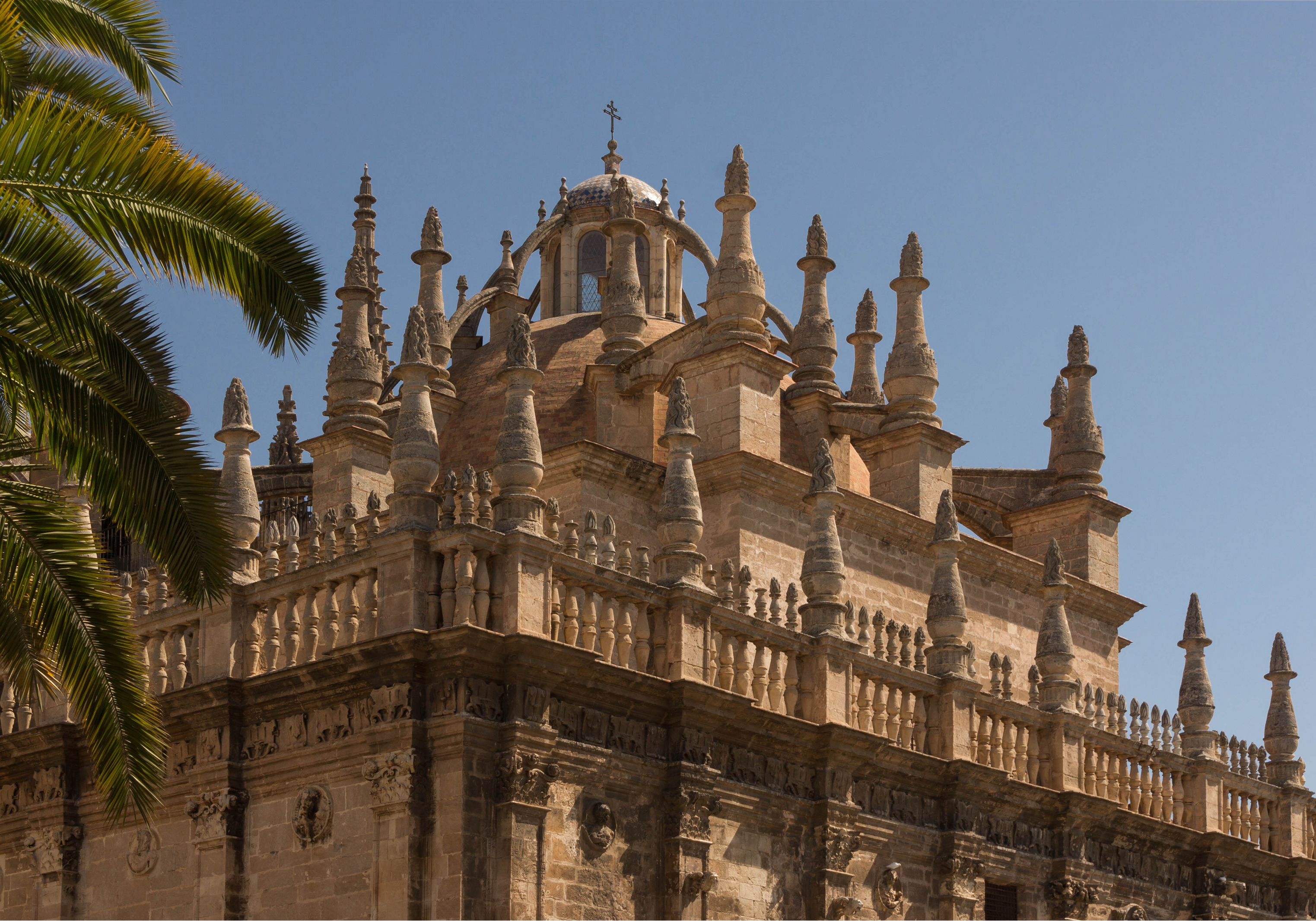
Seville Cathedral

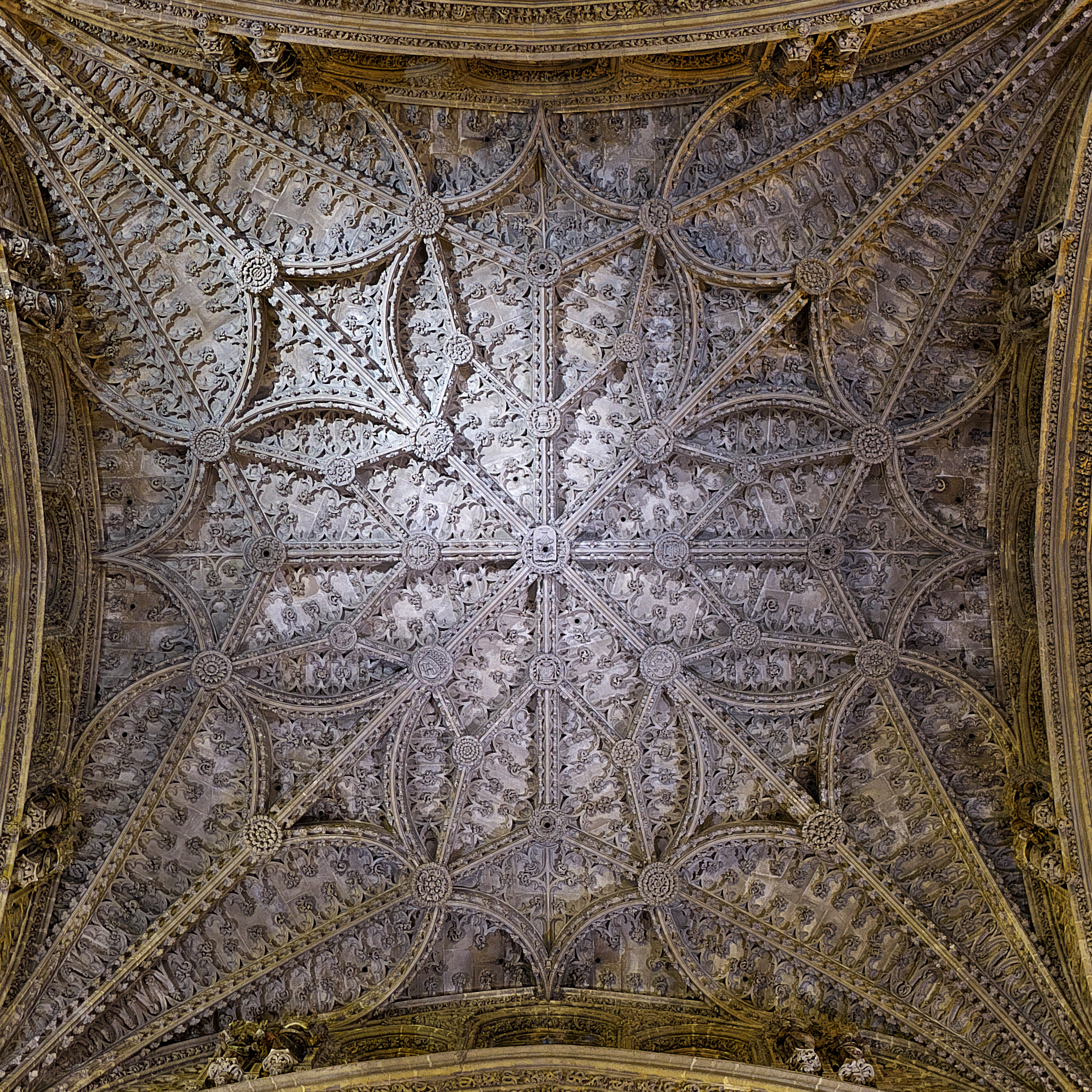
Crossing vault of Seville Cathedral by Juan Gil de Hontañón

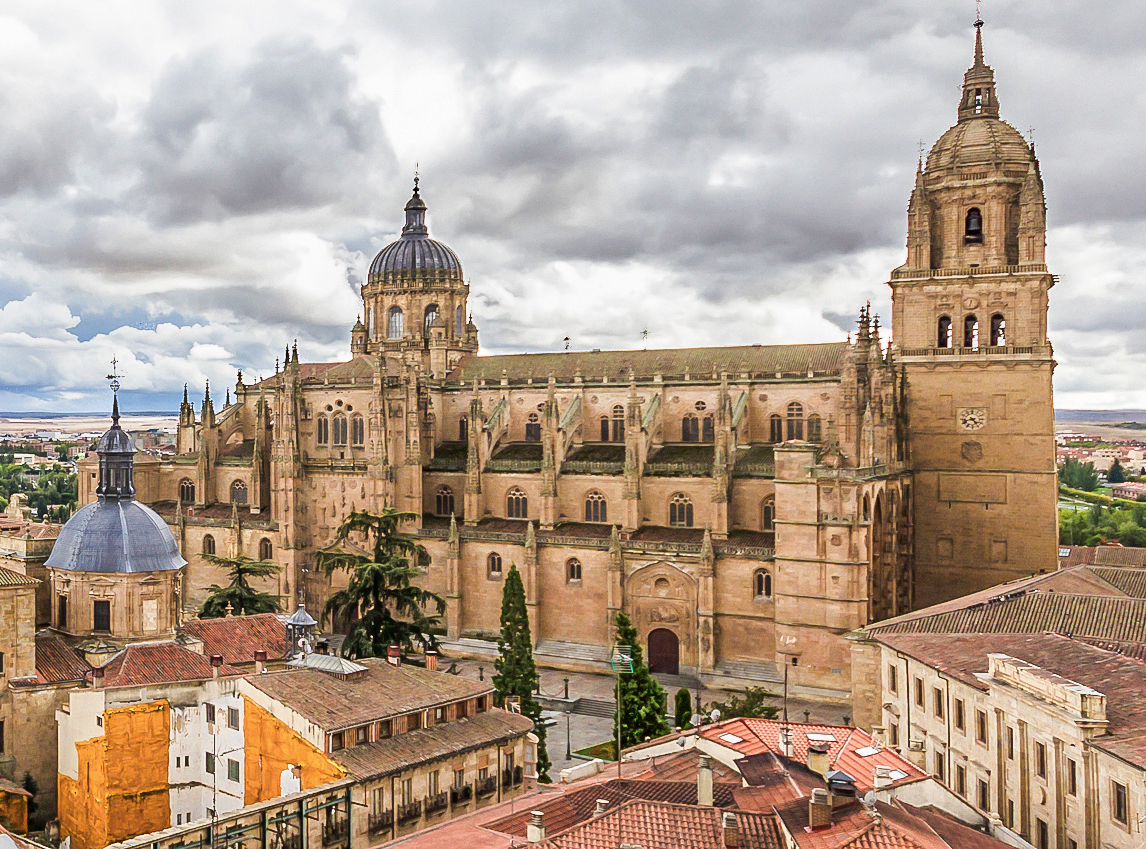
New Cathedral of Salamanca

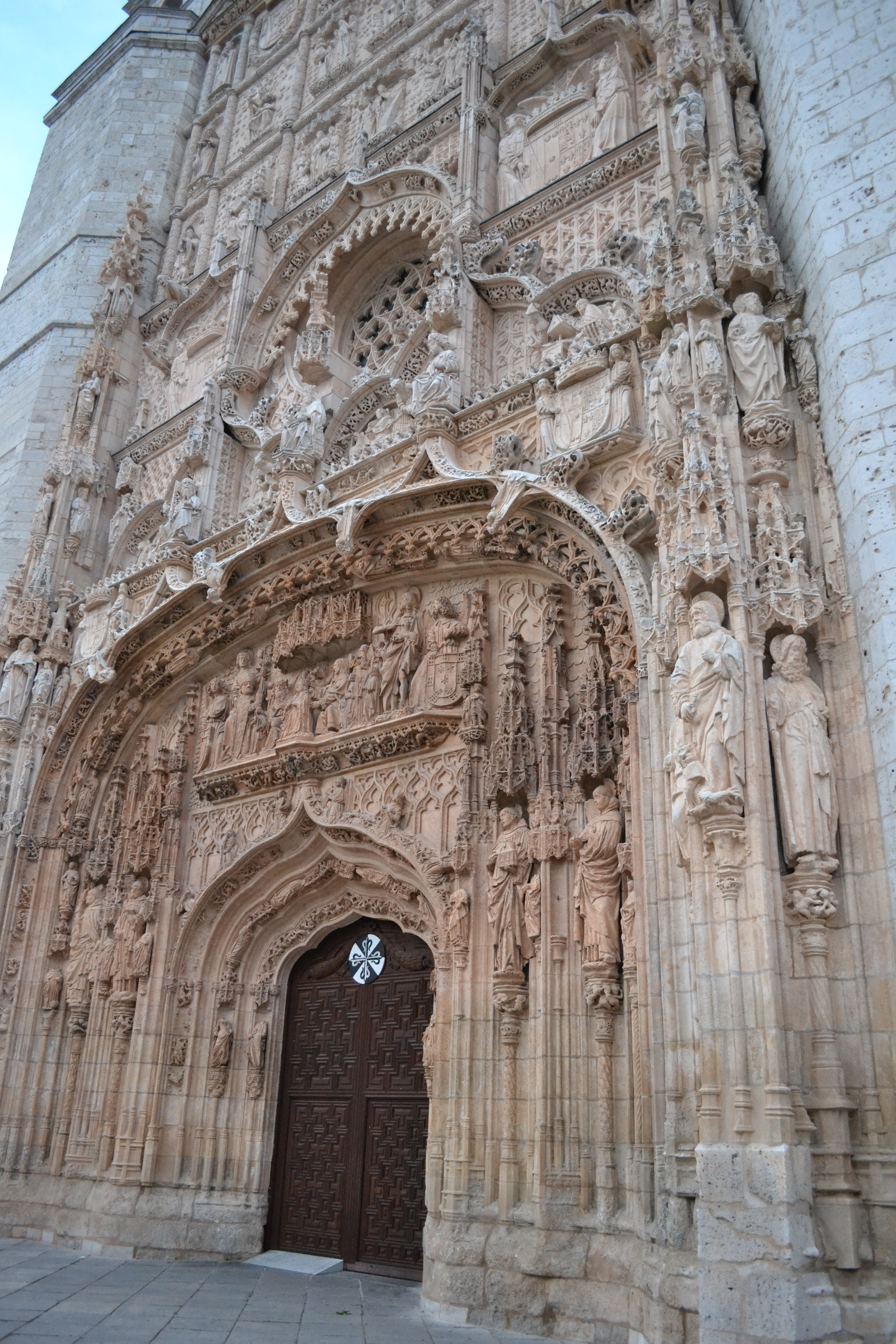
San Pablo Church, Valladoild

== See also ==
- Gothic architecture
- Romanesque architecture
- Cathedral architecture of Western Europe
- gothicmed
