= Levantine Gothic =

Gothic style

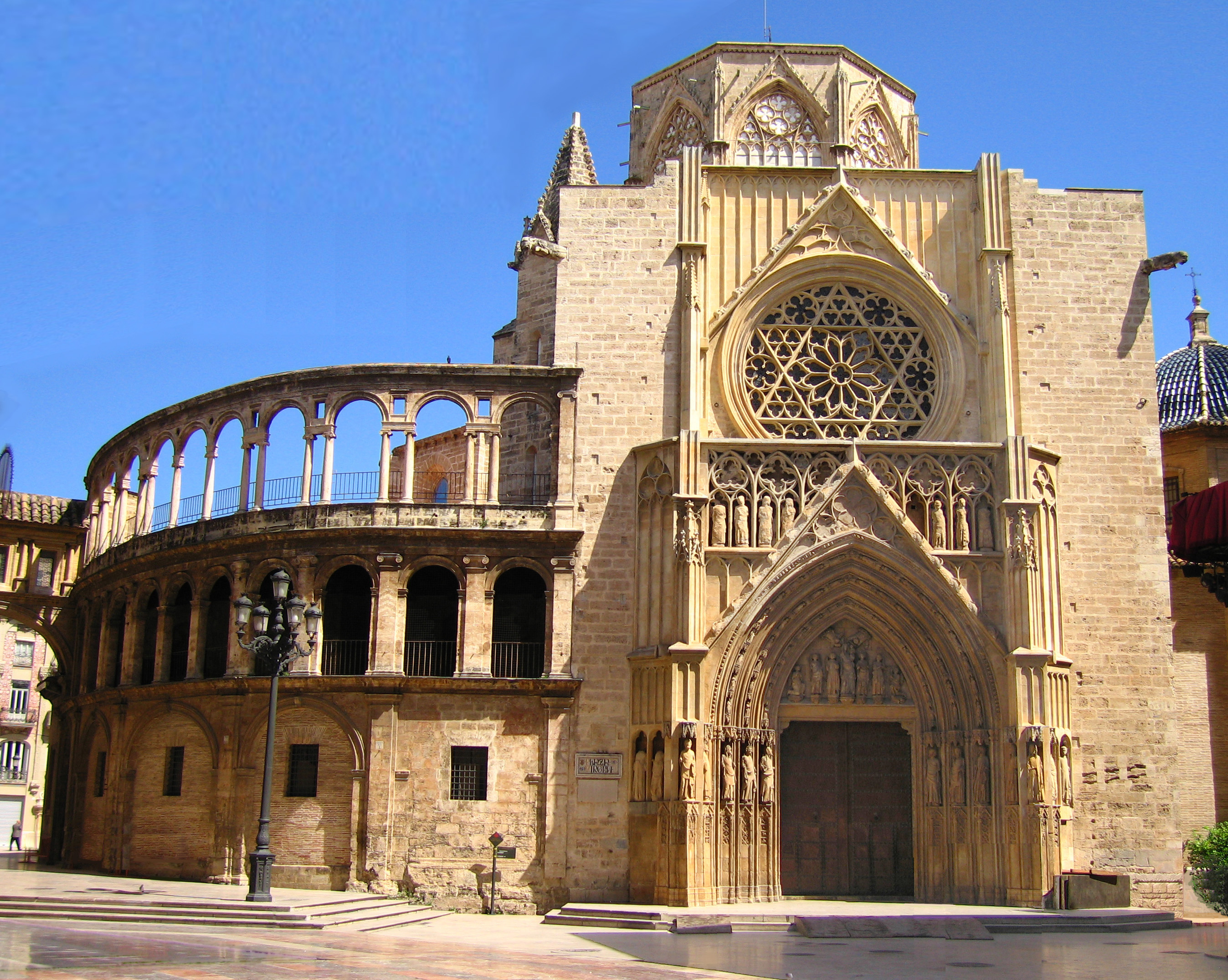
Porta dels Apòstols of the Cathedral of Valencia, a great example of Valencian Gothic.

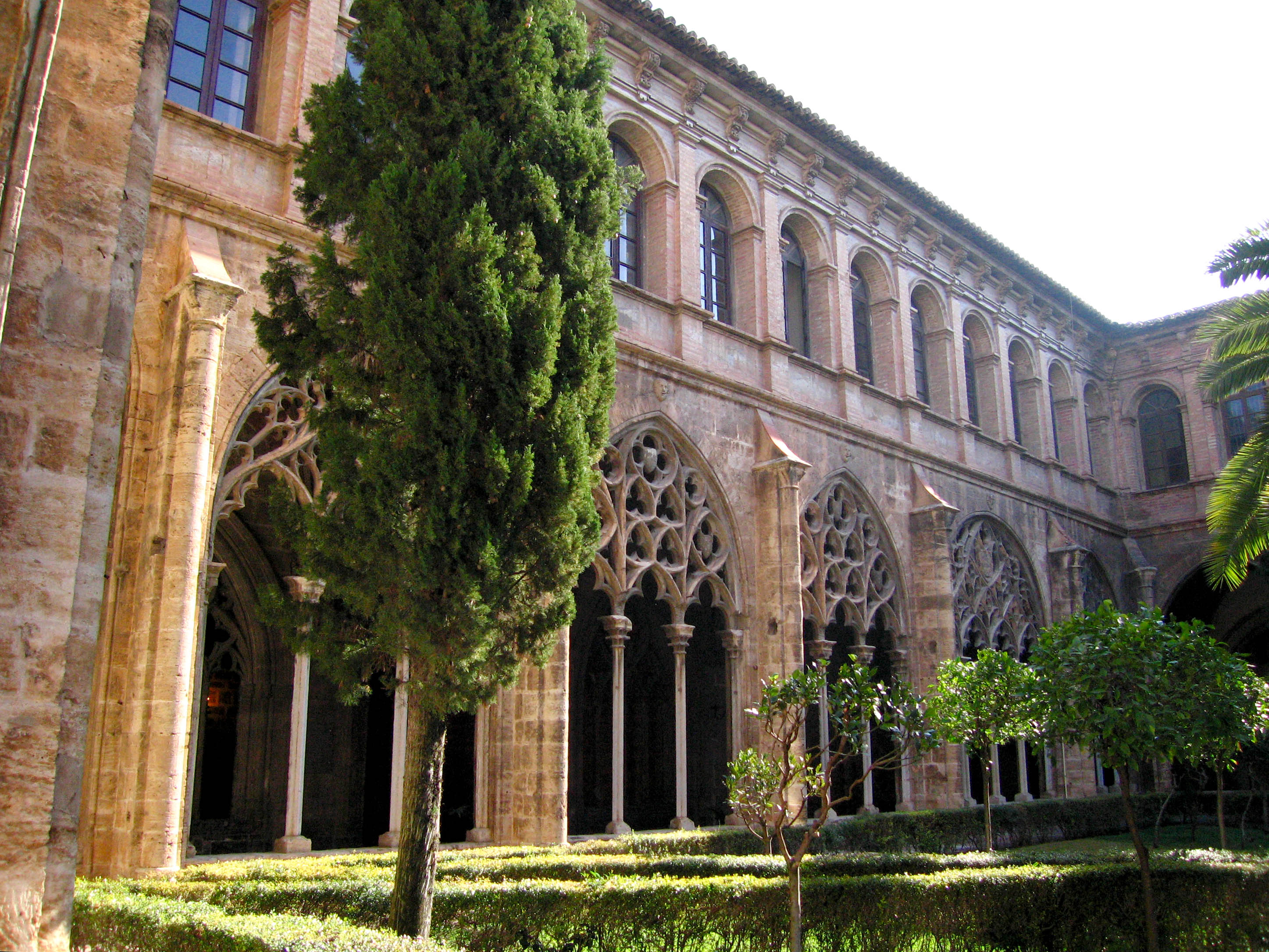
Convent of Sant Doménec, in the city of Valencia.

The Levantine Gothic is the Gothic style developed in Levante, the Mediterranean area of Spain, characterized by its halls and churches of great horizontal extent with emphasis on the structural part supported by buttresses and minimal and austere decorations.

The main differences with Castilian Gothic are:

- single nave instead of three, in case that there are, has the same height and the wider central
- chapels between the buttresses
- thinner supports
- low figurative decoration, dominated by the geometric type
- minor surface of openings, resulting in a low light penetration.

Very few examples of this style of architecture exist outside the larger Christian strongholds. The surrounding countryside was still being fought over by the Spanish Christians and Spanish Muslims (Muwallads). In the capital cities of Medieval mediterranean Christian kingdoms, cathedrals of this style were erected in the 13th and 14th centuries.

Many buildings of this architectural style can be found around the region of Valencia with its own style Valencian Gothic and across the Balearic Islands.

== See also ==
- Catalan Gothic
- Valencian Gothic
- Gothicmed
