= Gothicmed =

Gothicmed is a European Union project carried out within the Culture 2000 (2000–2006) programme and headed by the Ministry of Culture of the regional government of Valencia, Spain. Although the producer for this project remains unknown, the European Union's funding exceeded 500.000 Euros. The project aims to gain further insight into Gothic architecture in the Mediterranean.

In 2004, the Instituto Cervantes (Spain) got involved with Gothicmed to create a virtual museum of Mediterranean Gothic architecture.

== Mediterranean Gothic ==
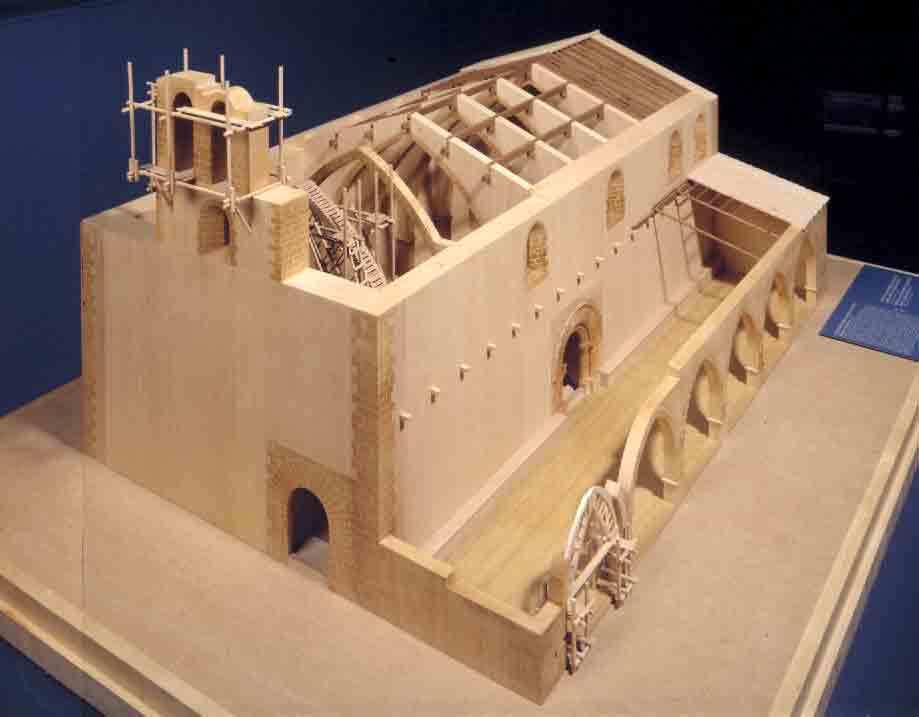
Model of Olocau Church (Valencia) by Carlos Martínez

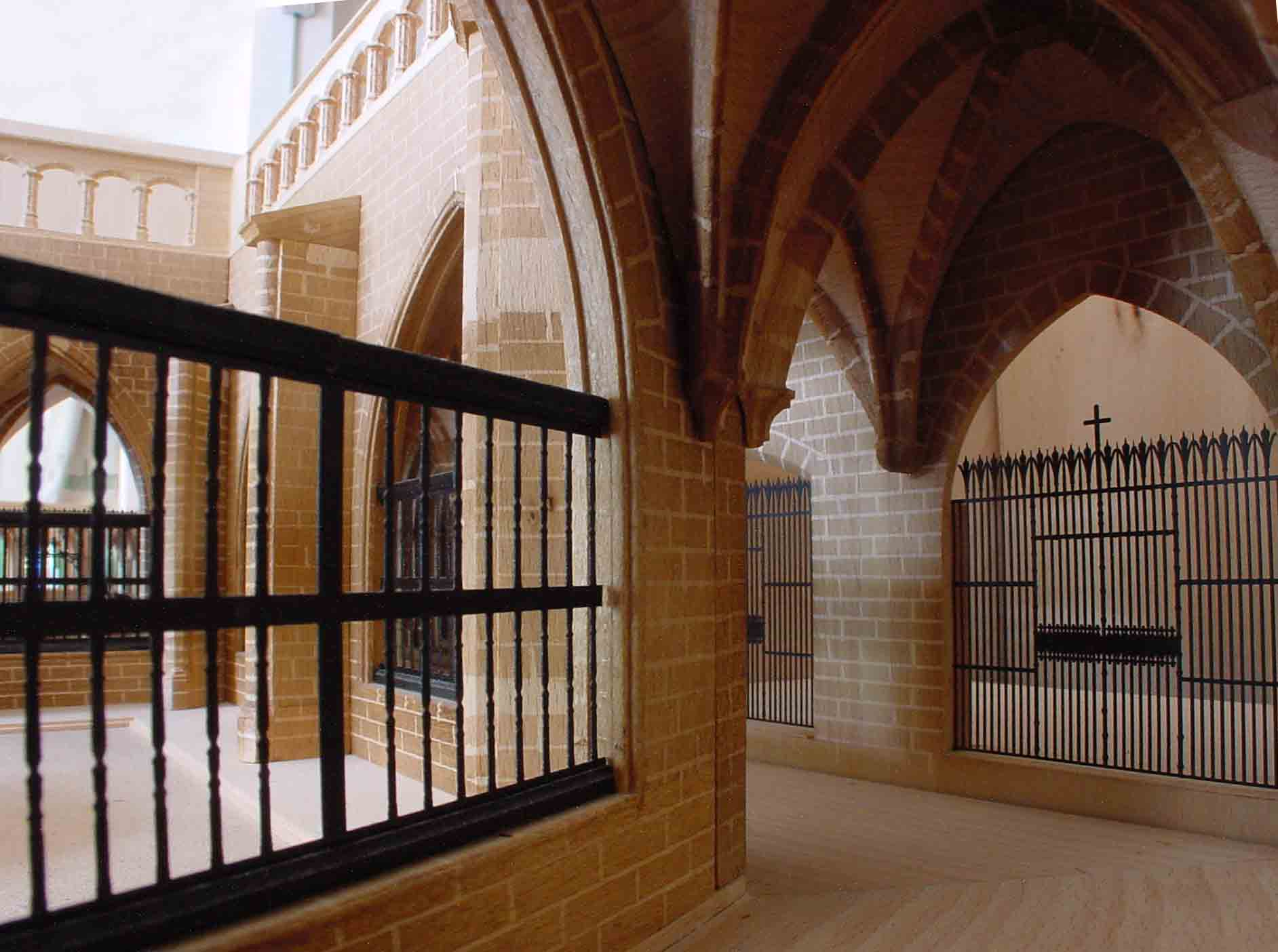
View of the Cloister of the Cathedral of Segorbe (Valencia), 1/50 model by Carlos Martínez

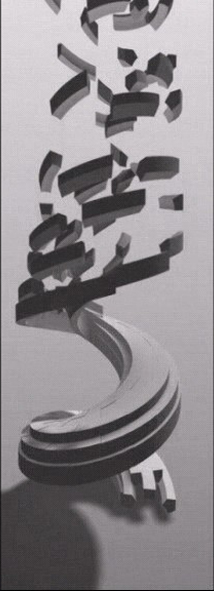
Video screenshot: The building of a Gothic staircase.

This project's goal is to create a network of research and dissemination on Mediterranean Gothic architecture that will enable this knowledge to be shared and spread. In the Mediterranean, stylistic features readily intertwine with its contemporary mediaeval architecture in central and northern Europe. However, the buildings are often quite distinct. Not surprisingly, the mediaeval architectural styles in the Mediterranean were built following traditions from the late Roman era. The ruined buildings from the ancient world scattered around the Mediterranean were the building manuals for whoever wanted to read them. The presence of an interesting Manual on Practical Geometry, or Geometria fabrorum, conveyed by guilds and workshops, characterises this episode in architectural history.

== Virtual views ==
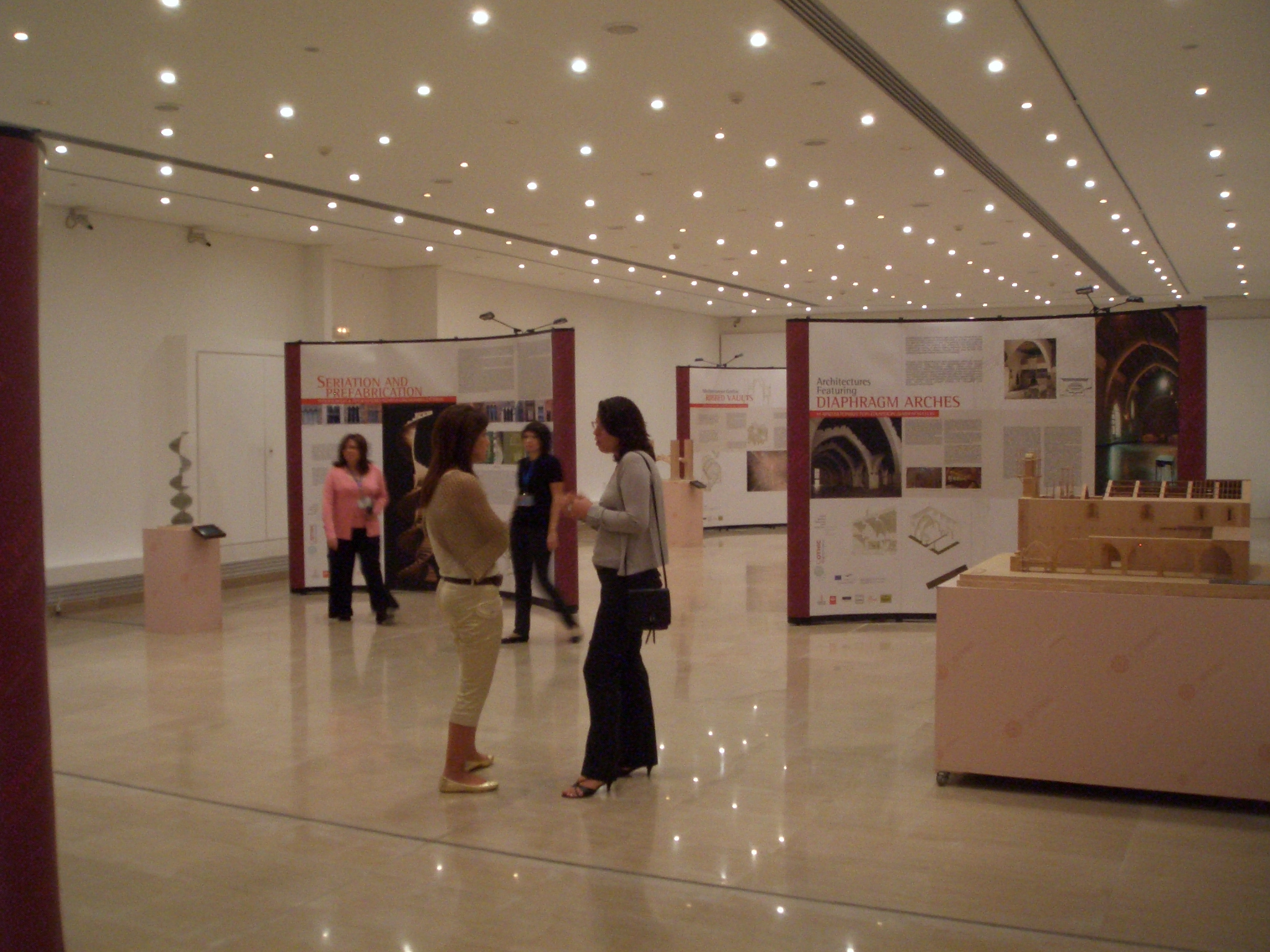
Gothic-themed travelling exhibition in Athens

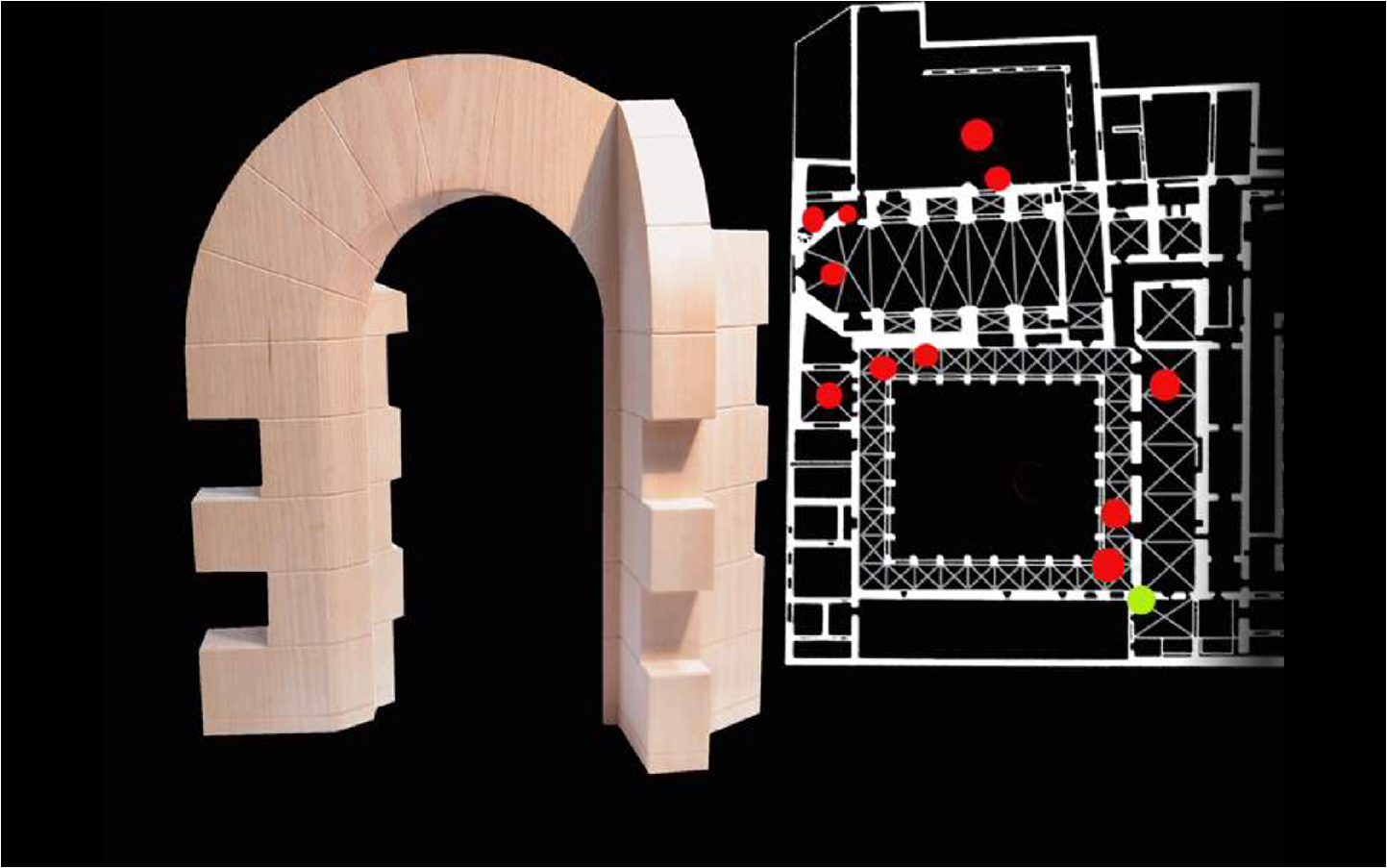
Gothic kitchen's door, virtual view (Trinity Convent Valencia)

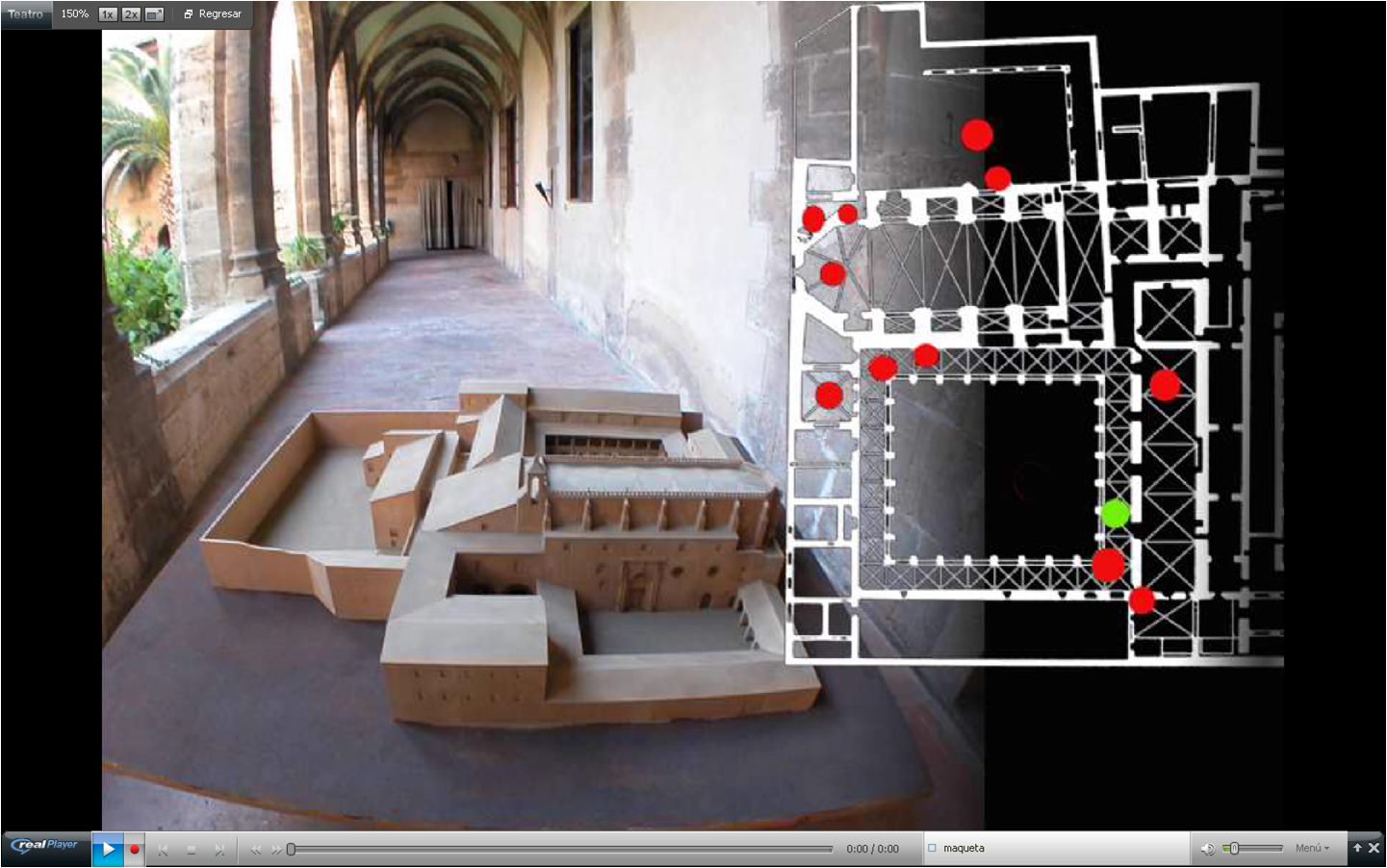
Model of the Trinity convent of Valencia

Visualising Panoramic views of Gothic monuments was one of the most challenging parts of the project, and it necessitated an exchange of experience between photographers of the different participating countries.

Each of the project partners produced panoramic pictures that were installed in the virtual gallery of the site. A tour through a border-less, virtual museum can be made through the open halls, which correspond to each of the sponsors of the project: Valencia Region, Greece, Sicily, Alentejo, Slovenia and the initiatives promoted by the Instituto Cervantes. Images of the monuments can be accessed via each of these halls by a virtual tour (panoramic images) or a guided tour (a text written by specialists, accompanied by layouts). Other sections include a library, news and links with other related websites. Upload onto Internet novel images inserted into virtual views of the most prominent monuments in this architectural style. These virtual views have been created through panoramic photographs, picture galleries, and videos. Texts have also been written with other images and drawings by specialists in the field, and the scientific community will have access to specialized books and articles online. GOTHIC medicine cannot replace seeing and enjoying Mediterranean Gothic architecture first-hand, but it does encourage it to be visited and allow knowledge about it to be enhanced. All partners have been invited to produce wooden scale models of Gothic monuments or parts of monuments, like Gothic staircases, to be shown in the travelling exhibition, which has been the more time-consuming activity of the project since it has been necessary to join efforts of an interdisciplinary team of professionals. These models are at a scale of 1/50 and have been displayed on wooden pedestals. A total of 10 models travelled to each of the project's locations in the framework of the travelling exhibition in Valencia (ES), Évora (PT), Palermo (IT), Ljubljana (SI), and Athens (GR).

== See also ==
- Gothic architecture
- Valencian Gothic
