= List of municipalities in Ávila =

Map of Spain with the province of Ávila highlighted

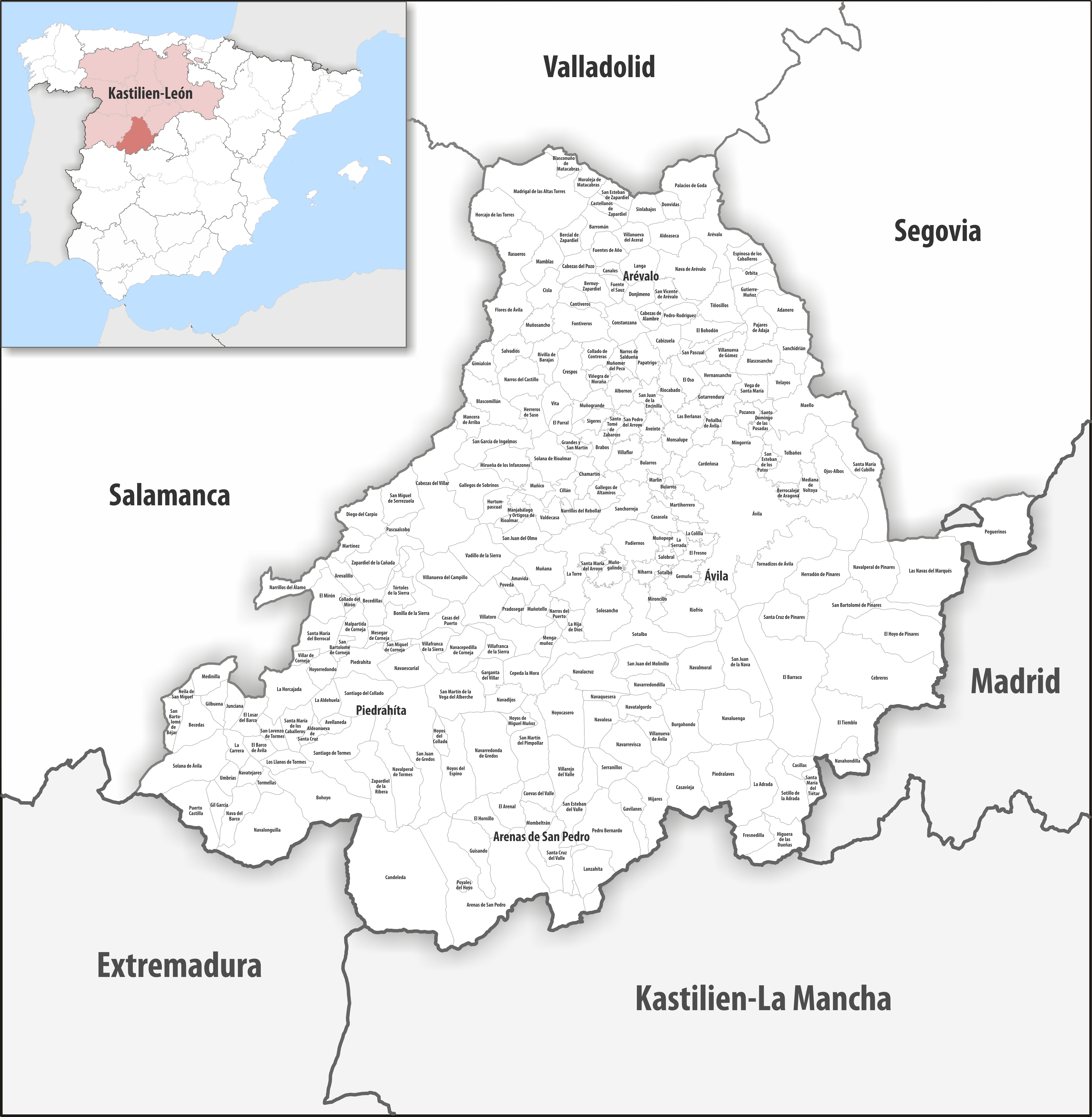
Map of the municipalities in the province of Ávila

Ávila is a province in the autonomous community of Castile and León, Spain. The province is divided into 248 municipalities. As of the 2024 Spanish census, Ávila is the 46th most populous of Spain's 50 provinces, with 160,463 inhabitants, and the 15th largest by land area, spanning 8,049.04 square kilometres (3,107.75 sq mi). Municipalities are the most basic local political division in Spain and can only belong to one province. They enjoy a large degree of autonomy in their local administration, being in charge of tasks such as urban planning, water supply, lighting, roads, local police, and firefighting.

The organisation of municipalities in Spain is outlined by the local government law Ley 7/1985, de 2 de abril, Reguladora de las Bases del Régimen Local (transl. Law 7/1985, of 2 April, Regulating the Bases of the Local Administration), which was passed by the Cortes Generales—Spain’s national parliament—on 2 April 1985 and finalised by royal decree on 18 April 1986. Municipalities in Ávila are also governed by the Statute of Autonomy of Castile and León, which includes provisions concerning their relations with Castile and León's autonomous government. All citizens of Spain are required to register in the municipality in which they reside. Each municipality is a corporation (Note: Within the context of local government in Spain, a corporation is a legal entity representing a municipality. Each municipality is empowered to govern over a specific piece of land and its population.) with independent legal personhood: its governing body is called the ayuntamiento (municipal council or corporation), a term often also used to refer to the municipal offices (city and town halls). The ayuntamiento is composed of the mayor (Spanish: alcalde), the deputy mayors (tenientes de alcalde) and the councillors (concejales), who form the plenary (pleno), the deliberative body. Municipalities are categorised by population for determining the number of councillors: three when the population is up to 100 inhabitants, five for 101–250, seven for 251–1,000, nine for 1,001–2,000, eleven for 2,001–5,000, thirteen for 5,001–10,000, seventeen for 10,001–20,000, twenty-one for 20,001–50,000, and twenty-five for 50,001–100,000.

The mayor and deputy mayors are elected by the plenary assembly, which is itself elected by universal suffrage. Elections in municipalities with more than 250 inhabitants are carried out following a proportional representation system with closed lists, whilst those with a population lower than 250 use a block plurality voting system with open lists. The plenary assembly must meet periodically, with meetings occurring more or less frequently depending on the population of the municipality: monthly for those whose population is larger than 20,000, once every two months if they range between 5,001 and 20,000, and once every three months if they do not exceed 5,000. Many ayuntamientos also have a local governing board (Spanish: junta de gobierno local), which is appointed by the mayor from amongst the councillors and is required for municipalities of over 5,000 inhabitants. The board, whose role is to assist the mayor between meetings of the plenary assembly, may not include more than one third of the councillors.

The largest municipality by population in the province as of the 2024 Spanish census is Ávila, its capital, with 59,119 residents, while the smallest is Blasconuño de Matacabras, with 14 residents. Most municipalities experienced a decline in population from 2011 to 2024. The largest municipality by area is also Ávila, which spans 230.70 square kilometres (89.07 sq mi), while Poyales del Hoyo is the smallest at 3.38 square kilometres (1.31 sq mi).

== Municipalities ==
Largest municipalities in the province of Ávila by population

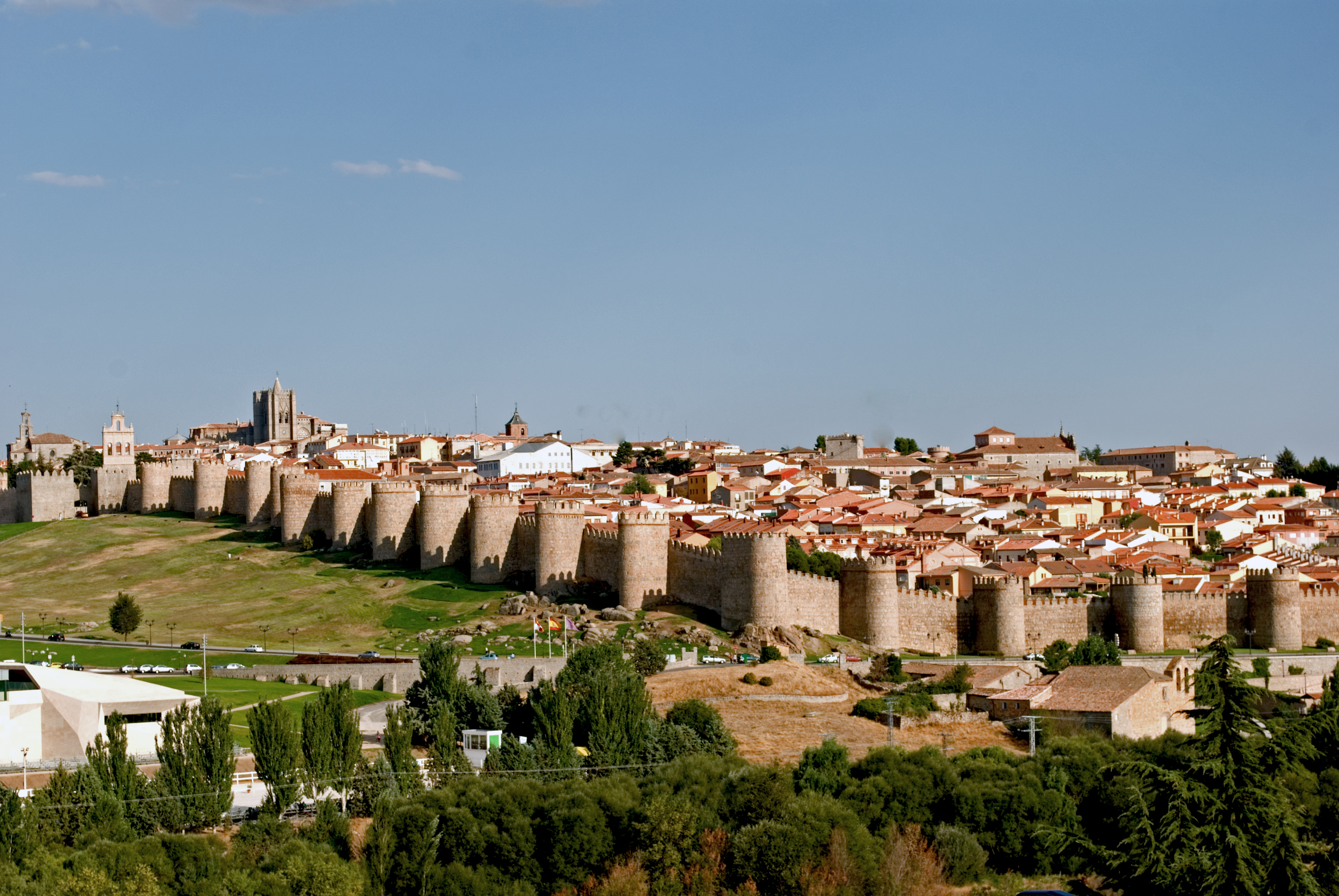
Ávila is the province's capital and largest municipality by population.

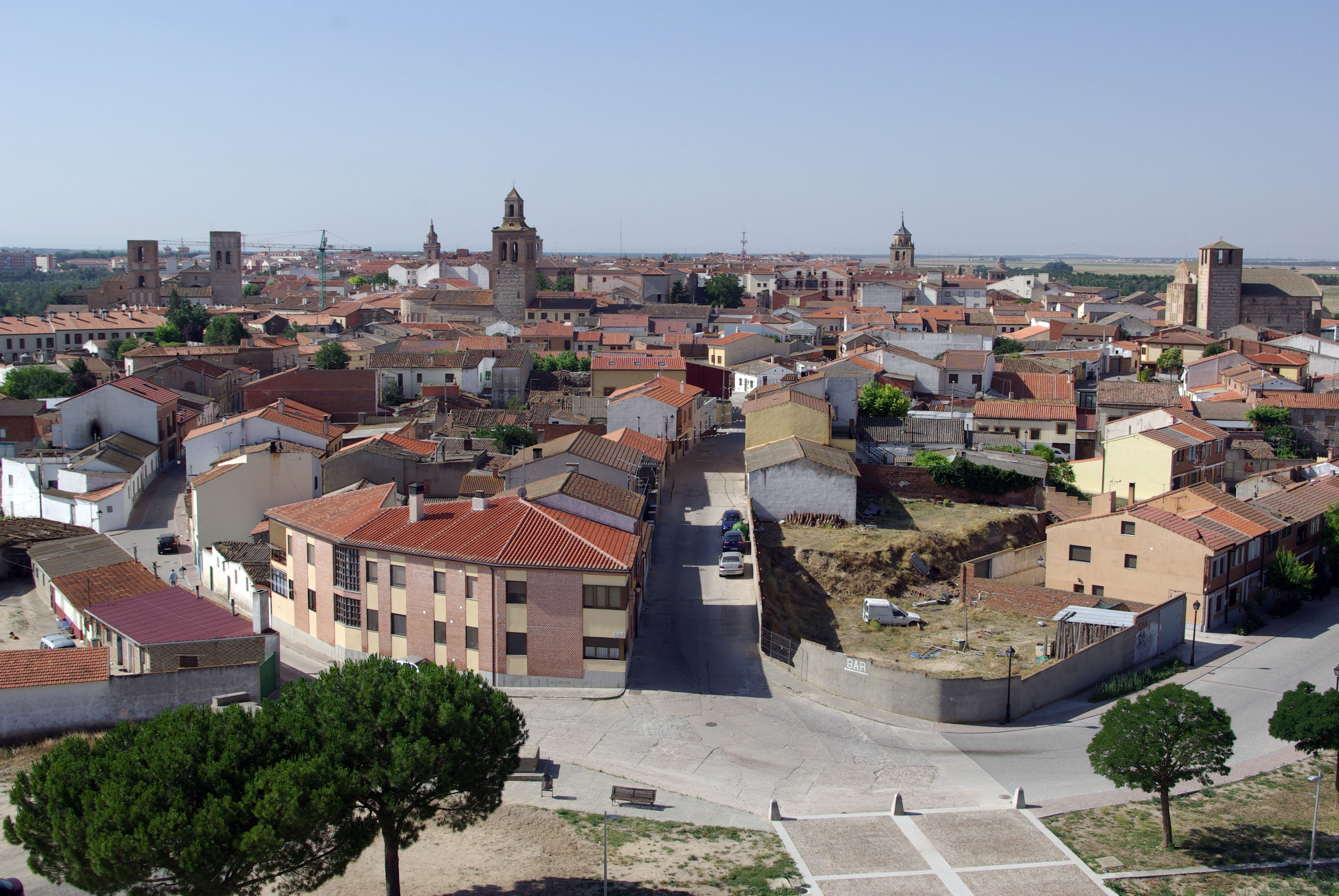
Arévalo, the second largest municipality by population in the province of Ávila

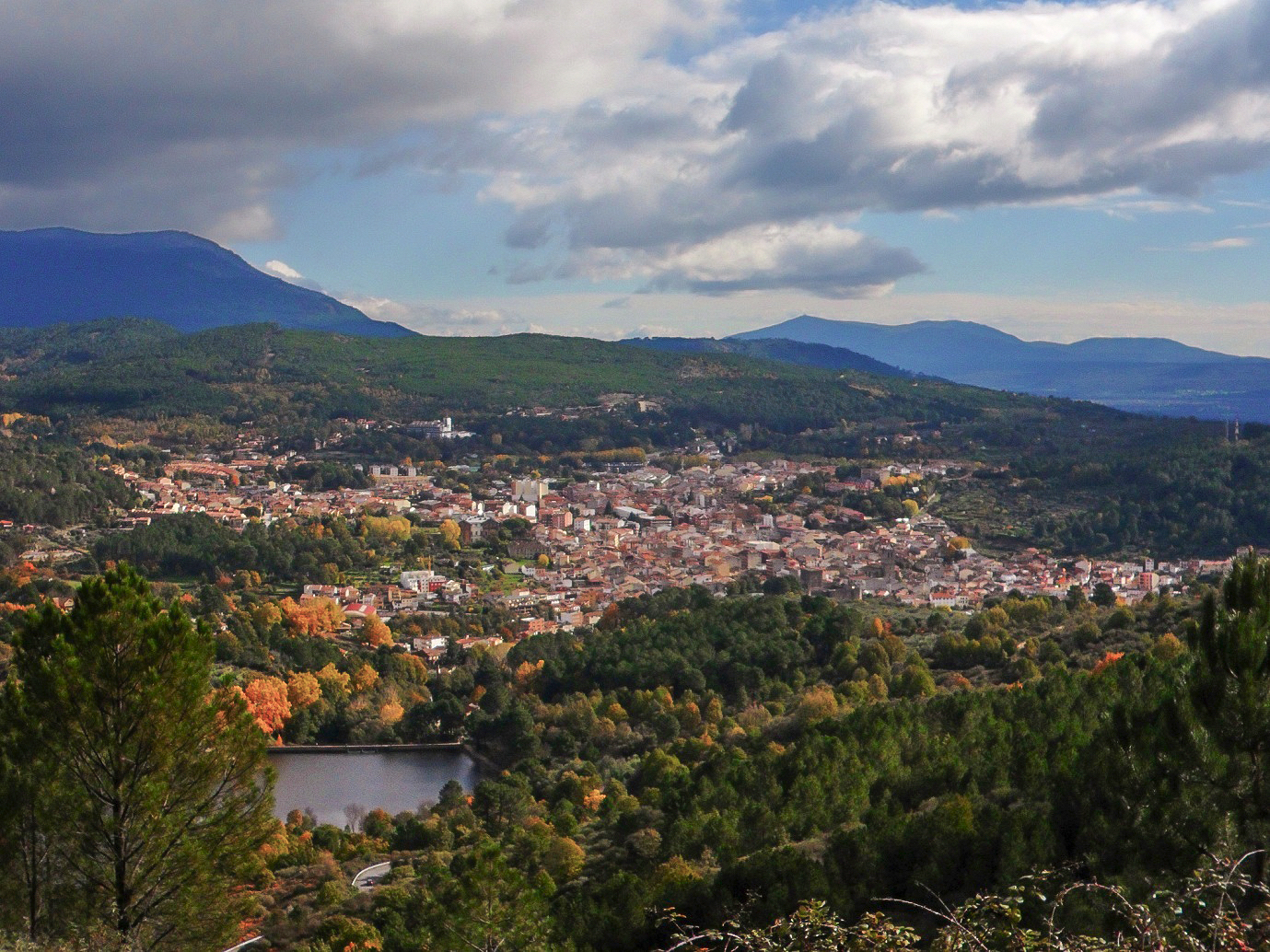
Arenas de San Pedro is the province's third largest municipality by population.

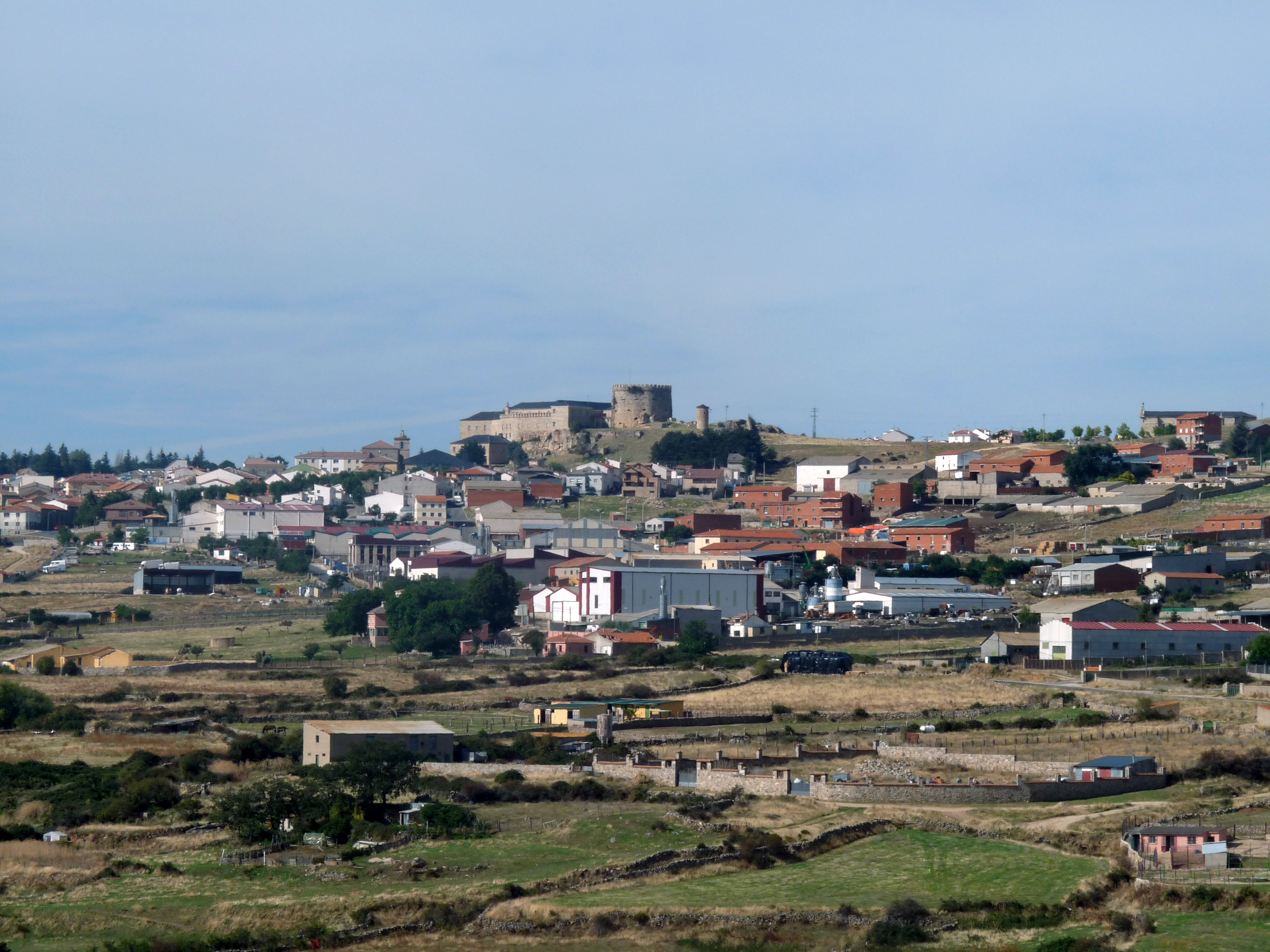
Las Navas del Marqués, Ávila's fourth largest municipality by population

† Provincial capital

Municipalities in the province of Ávila
Name	Population (2024 census)	Population (2011 census)	Population change	Land area (km²)	Population density (2024)
Adanero	215	264	−18.6%	31.42	6.8/km^{2}
La Adrada	2,835	2,685	+5.6%	58.64	48.3/km^{2}
Albornos	175	218	−19.7%	17.10	10.2/km^{2}
Aldeanueva de Santa Cruz	101	135	−25.2%	8.48	11.9/km^{2}
Aldeaseca	204	277	−26.4%	24.25	8.4/km^{2}
La Aldehuela	145	203	−28.6%	17.15	8.5/km^{2}
Amavida	133	174	−23.6%	15.02	8.9/km^{2}
El Arenal	988	1,027	−3.8%	27.08	36.5/km^{2}
Arenas de San Pedro	6,470	6,870	−5.8%	193.55	33.4/km^{2}
Arevalillo	59	104	−43.3%	14.97	3.9/km^{2}
Arévalo	7,858	8,098	−3.0%	45.71	171.9/km^{2}
Aveinte	73	92	−20.7%	12.84	5.7/km^{2}
Avellaneda	23	32	−28.1%	10.23	2.2/km^{2}
Ávila†	59,119	59,482	−0.61%	230.70	256.3/km^{2}
El Barco de Ávila	2,307	2,688	−14.2%	12.68	181.9/km^{2}
El Barraco	2,022	2,073	−2.5%	153.90	13.1/km^{2}
Barromán	175	203	−13.8%	20.03	8.7/km^{2}
Becedas	155	266	−41.7%	32.20	4.8/km^{2}
Becedillas	69	117	−41.0%	19.86	3.5/km^{2}
Bercial de Zapardiel	173	246	−29.7%	17.31	10.0/km^{2}
Las Berlanas	323	365	−11.5%	16.69	19.4/km^{2}
Bernuy-Zapardiel	87	138	−37.0%	19.78	4.4/km^{2}
Berrocalejo de Aragona	56	49	+14.3%	9.01	6.2/km^{2}
Blascomillán	168	210	−20.0%	39.60	4.2/km^{2}
Blasconuño de Matacabras	14	18	−22.2%	12.99	1.1/km^{2}
Blascosancho	98	105	−6.7%	22.95	4.3/km^{2}
El Bohodón	112	142	−21.1%	22.09	5.1/km^{2}
Bohoyo	215	324	−33.6%	74.37	2.9/km^{2}
Bonilla de la Sierra	163	136	+19.9%	55.06	3.0/km^{2}
Brabos	37	55	−32.7%	18.35	2.0/km^{2}
Bularros	55	80	−31.2%	30.76	1.8/km^{2}
Burgohondo	1,256	1,302	−3.5%	55.34	22.7/km^{2}
Cabezas de Alambre	154	177	−13.0%	11.80	13.1/km^{2}
Cabezas del Pozo	83	87	−4.6%	17.97	4.6/km^{2}
Cabezas del Villar	239	316	−24.4%	110.07	2.2/km^{2}
Cabizuela	89	113	−21.2%	19.17	4.6/km^{2}
Canales	35	49	−28.6%	6.67	5.2/km^{2}
Candeleda	5,027	5,223	−3.8%	213.47	23.5/km^{2}
Cantiveros	99	143	−30.8%	14.37	6.9/km^{2}
Cardeñosa	422	495	−14.7%	40.50	10.4/km^{2}
La Carrera	160	212	−24.5%	14.16	11.3/km^{2}
Casas del Puerto	82	106	−22.6%	22.14	3.7/km^{2}
Casasola	65	89	−27.0%	18.36	3.5/km^{2}
Casavieja	1,404	1,578	−11.0%	39.24	35.8/km^{2}
Casillas	669	808	−17.2%	11.99	55.8/km^{2}
Castellanos de Zapardiel	112	101	+10.9%	12.70	8.8/km^{2}
Cebreros	3,251	3,505	−7.2%	137.47	23.6/km^{2}
Cepeda la Mora	67	90	−25.6%	31.39	2.1/km^{2}
Chamartín	63	91	−30.8%	15.45	4.1/km^{2}
Cillán	78	116	−32.8%	14.17	5.5/km^{2}
Cisla	104	138	−24.6%	20.31	5.1/km^{2}
La Colilla	371	342	+8.5%	10.80	34.4/km^{2}
Collado de Contreras	147	237	−38.0%	18.44	8.0/km^{2}
Collado del Mirón	21	45	−53.3%	4.84	4.3/km^{2}
Constanzana	99	123	−19.5%	26.85	3.7/km^{2}
Crespos	485	536	−9.5%	31.92	15.2/km^{2}
Cuevas del Valle	518	541	−4.3%	19.17	27.0/km^{2}
Diego del Carpio	106	174	−39.1%	33.81	3.1/km^{2}
Donjimeno	72	95	−24.2%	14.75	4.9/km^{2}
Donvidas	35	44	−20.5%	11.48	3.0/km^{2}
Espinosa de los Caballeros	99	108	−8.3%	19.40	5.1/km^{2}
Flores de Ávila	273	343	−20.4%	43.04	6.3/km^{2}
Fontiveros	727	836	−13.0%	36.42	20.0/km^{2}
Fresnedilla	98	111	−11.7%	24.44	4.0/km^{2}
El Fresno	603	572	+5.4%	13.11	46.0/km^{2}
Fuente el Saúz	152	196	−22.4%	9.81	15.5/km^{2}
Fuentes de Año	88	135	−34.8%	20.01	4.4/km^{2}
Gallegos de Altamiros	59	63	−6.3%	20.47	2.9/km^{2}
Gallegos de Sobrinos	44	74	−40.5%	43.27	1.0/km^{2}
Garganta del Villar	39	47	−17.0%	18.19	2.1/km^{2}
Gavilanes	529	657	−19.5%	29.18	18.1/km^{2}
Gemuño	145	161	−9.9%	17.19	8.4/km^{2}
Gilbuena	47	88	−46.6%	15.13	3.1/km^{2}
Gil García	48	40	+20.0%	15.45	3.1/km^{2}
Gimialcón	76	96	−20.8%	19.05	4.0/km^{2}
Gotarrendura	166	164	+1.2%	10.63	15.6/km^{2}
Grandes y San Martín	35	31	+12.9%	11.59	3.0/km^{2}
Guisando	478	565	−15.4%	38.33	12.5/km^{2}
Gutierre-Muñoz	65	76	−14.5%	22.15	2.9/km^{2}
Hernansancho	142	190	−25.3%	19.38	7.3/km^{2}
Herradón de Pinares	523	575	−9.0%	48.40	10.8/km^{2}
Herreros de Suso	148	169	−12.4%	21.53	6.9/km^{2}
Higuera de las Dueñas	269	341	−21.1%	35.08	7.7/km^{2}
La Hija de Dios	77	86	−10.5%	12.50	6.2/km^{2}
La Horcajada	454	571	−20.5%	46.52	9.8/km^{2}
Horcajo de las Torres	438	610	−28.2%	47.32	9.3/km^{2}
El Hornillo	280	345	−18.8%	23.27	12.0/km^{2}
Hoyocasero	310	316	−1.9%	52.30	5.9/km^{2}
El Hoyo de Pinares	2,184	2,398	−8.9%	80.51	27.1/km^{2}
Hoyorredondo	61	87	−29.9%	17.22	3.5/km^{2}
Hoyos del Collado	29	35	−17.1%	9.88	2.9/km^{2}
Hoyos del Espino	358	454	−21.1%	52.92	6.8/km^{2}
Hoyos de Miguel Muñoz	26	42	−38.1%	11.87	2.2/km^{2}
Hurtumpascual	44	75	−41.3%	18.61	2.4/km^{2}
Junciana	40	68	−41.2%	15.02	2.7/km^{2}
Langa	459	518	−11.4%	24.45	18.8/km^{2}
Lanzahíta	824	914	−9.8%	33.52	24.6/km^{2}
El Losar del Barco	104	138	−24.6%	19.54	5.3/km^{2}
Los Llanos de Tormes	63	90	−30.0%	17.46	3.6/km^{2}
Madrigal de las Altas Torres	1,301	1,628	−20.1%	106.80	12.2/km^{2}
Maello	704	723	−2.6%	65.34	10.8/km^{2}
Malpartida de Corneja	90	140	−35.7%	19.07	4.7/km^{2}
Mamblas	196	232	−15.5%	24.04	8.2/km^{2}
Mancera de Arriba	71	97	−26.8%	17.59	4.0/km^{2}
Manjabálago y Ortigosa de Rioalmar	23	40	−42.5%	17.01	1.4/km^{2}
Marlín	30	38	−21.1%	6.39	4.7/km^{2}
Martiherrero	360	298	+20.8%	22.79	15.8/km^{2}
Martínez	109	156	−30.1%	18.06	6.0/km^{2}
Mediana de Voltoya	117	103	+13.6%	18.38	6.4/km^{2}
Medinilla	78	135	−42.2%	22.88	3.4/km^{2}
Mengamuñoz	54	70	−22.9%	11.87	4.5/km^{2}
Mesegar de Corneja	67	79	−15.2%	10.29	6.5/km^{2}
Mijares	730	831	−12.2%	47.22	15.5/km^{2}
Mingorría	407	410	−0.7%	30.69	13.3/km^{2}
El Mirón	98	153	−35.9%	31.08	3.2/km^{2}
Mironcillo	113	105	+7.6%	15.23	7.4/km^{2}
Mirueña de los Infanzones	95	125	−24.0%	31.21	3.0/km^{2}
Mombeltrán	916	1,165	−21.4%	49.98	18.3/km^{2}
Monsalupe	59	62	−4.8%	17.70	3.3/km^{2}
Moraleja de Matacabras	53	52	+1.9%	14.93	3.5/km^{2}
Muñana	498	501	−0.6%	33.61	14.8/km^{2}
Muñico	80	119	−32.8%	13.28	6.0/km^{2}
Muñogalindo	300	390	−23.1%	18.77	16.0/km^{2}
Muñogrande	79	79	0.0%	16.16	4.9/km^{2}
Muñomer del Peco	111	140	−20.7%	10.09	11.0/km^{2}
Muñopepe	104	105	−1.0%	6.02	17.3/km^{2}
Muñosancho	88	122	−27.9%	19.72	4.5/km^{2}
Muñotello	49	76	−35.5%	19.94	2.5/km^{2}
Narrillos del Álamo	57	94	−39.4%	29.35	1.9/km^{2}
Narrillos del Rebollar	34	60	−43.3%	17.41	2.0/km^{2}
Narros del Castillo	153	186	−17.7%	33.61	4.6/km^{2}
Narros del Puerto	29	36	−19.4%	10.37	2.8/km^{2}
Narros de Saldueña	106	131	−19.1%	9.44	11.2/km^{2}
Navacepedilla de Corneja	99	112	−11.6%	29.50	3.4/km^{2}
Nava de Arévalo	662	851	−22.2%	58.26	11.4/km^{2}
Nava del Barco	83	110	−24.5%	29.37	2.8/km^{2}
Navadijos	28	46	−39.1%	19.85	1.4/km^{2}
Navaescurial	57	58	−1.7%	35.31	1.6/km^{2}
Navahondilla	355	327	+8.6%	22.07	16.1/km^{2}
Navalacruz	210	276	−23.9%	50.03	4.2/km^{2}
Navalmoral	400	423	−5.4%	43.35	9.2/km^{2}
Navalonguilla	184	294	−37.4%	90.75	2.0/km^{2}
Navalosa	322	352	−8.5%	30.00	10.7/km^{2}
Navalperal de Pinares	824	979	−15.8%	49.83	16.5/km^{2}
Navalperal de Tormes	77	109	−29.4%	60.96	1.3/km^{2}
Navaluenga	2,177	2,165	+0.6%	73.53	29.6/km^{2}
Navaquesera	43	34	+26.5%	9.20	4.7/km^{2}
Navarredonda de Gredos	454	443	+2.5%	78.81	5.8/km^{2}
Navarredondilla	160	261	−38.7%	20.27	7.9/km^{2}
Navarrevisca	301	317	−5.0%	39.99	7.5/km^{2}
Las Navas del Marqués	5,593	5,724	−2.3%	97.93	57.1/km^{2}
Navatalgordo	238	249	−4.4%	20.09	11.8/km^{2}
Navatejares	50	66	−24.2%	11.08	4.5/km^{2}
Neila de San Miguel	62	84	−26.2%	7.89	7.9/km^{2}
Niharra	190	169	+12.4%	11.28	16.8/km^{2}
Ojos-Albos	98	62	+58.1%	49.13	2.0/km^{2}
Orbita	71	89	−20.2%	14.39	4.9/km^{2}
El Oso	129	208	−38.0%	18.49	7.0/km^{2}
Padiernos	275	272	+1.1%	36.99	7.4/km^{2}
Pajares de Adaja	137	187	−26.7%	23.24	5.9/km^{2}
Palacios de Goda	402	447	−10.1%	52.99	7.6/km^{2}
Papatrigo	221	263	−16.0%	21.00	10.5/km^{2}
El Parral	65	106	−38.7%	10.89	6.0/km^{2}
Pascualcobo	39	41	−4.9%	16.14	2.4/km^{2}
Pedro Bernardo	773	953	−18.9%	68.98	11.2/km^{2}
Pedro-Rodríguez	129	183	−29.5%	14.08	9.2/km^{2}
Peguerinos	299	310	−3.5%	87.01	3.4/km^{2}
Peñalba de Ávila	106	125	−15.2%	23.52	4.5/km^{2}
Piedrahíta	1,656	2,007	−17.5%	28.67	57.8/km^{2}
Piedralaves	2,166	2,289	−5.4%	55.21	39.2/km^{2}
Poveda	33	59	−44.1%	6.51	5.1/km^{2}
Poyales del Hoyo	492	588	−16.3%	3.38	145.6/km^{2}
Pozanco	59	61	−3.3%	11.07	5.3/km^{2}
Pradosegar	118	148	−20.3%	11.29	10.5/km^{2}
Puerto Castilla	98	101	−3.0%	43.28	2.3/km^{2}
Rasueros	161	235	−31.5%	40.66	4.0/km^{2}
Riocabado	125	172	−27.3%	19.77	6.3/km^{2}
Riofrío	191	254	−24.8%	65.53	2.9/km^{2}
Rivilla de Barajas	56	75	−25.3%	24.38	2.3/km^{2}
Salobral	106	135	−21.5%	7.55	14.0/km^{2}
Salvadiós	70	85	−17.6%	20.38	3.4/km^{2}
San Bartolomé de Béjar	49	47	+4.3%	16.49	3.0/km^{2}
San Bartolomé de Corneja	35	66	−47.0%	7.36	4.8/km^{2}
San Bartolomé de Pinares	490	624	−21.5%	74.49	6.6/km^{2}
Sanchidrián	706	817	−13.6%	26.60	26.5/km^{2}
Sanchorreja	79	93	−15.1%	35.32	2.2/km^{2}
San Esteban de los Patos	20	36	−44.4%	10.36	1.9/km^{2}
San Esteban del Valle	734	831	−11.7%	39.35	18.7/km^{2}
San Esteban de Zapardiel	40	54	−25.9%	12.99	3.1/km^{2}
San García de Ingelmos	66	102	−35.3%	38.08	1.7/km^{2}
San Juan de la Encinilla	70	104	−32.7%	17.38	4.0/km^{2}
San Juan de Gredos	226	317	−28.7%	95.91	2.4/km^{2}
San Juan de la Nava	427	527	−19.0%	60.78	7.0/km^{2}
San Juan del Molinillo	237	276	−14.1%	35.79	6.6/km^{2}
San Juan del Olmo	85	114	−25.4%	30.52	2.8/km^{2}
San Lorenzo de Tormes	30	56	−46.4%	14.50	2.1/km^{2}
San Martín de la Vega del Alberche	153	200	−23.5%	50.48	3.0/km^{2}
San Martín del Pimpollar	219	229	−4.4%	45.64	4.8/km^{2}
San Miguel de Corneja	72	77	−6.5%	6.84	10.5/km^{2}
San Miguel de Serrezuela	107	170	−37.1%	34.75	3.1/km^{2}
San Pascual	44	53	−17.0%	18.61	2.4/km^{2}
San Pedro del Arroyo	501	473	+5.9%	18.55	27.0/km^{2}
Santa Cruz del Valle	306	431	−29.0%	29.62	10.3/km^{2}
Santa Cruz de Pinares	173	164	+5.5%	41.37	4.2/km^{2}
Santa María del Arroyo	102	98	+4.1%	11.13	9.2/km^{2}
Santa María del Berrocal	380	450	−15.6%	28.34	13.4/km^{2}
Santa María del Cubillo	320	345	−7.2%	65.77	4.9/km^{2}
Santa María de los Caballeros	72	94	−23.4%	22.40	3.2/km^{2}
Santa María del Tiétar	552	576	−4.2%	11.98	46.1/km^{2}
Santiago del Collado	167	203	−17.7%	42.69	3.9/km^{2}
Santiago del Tormes	109	156	−30.1%	68.45	1.6/km^{2}
Santo Domingo de las Posadas	70	92	−23.9%	13.34	5.2/km^{2}
Santo Tomé de Zabarcos	76	111	−31.5%	8.42	9.0/km^{2}
San Vicente de Arévalo	166	203	−18.2%	16.12	10.3/km^{2}
La Serrada	136	114	+19.3%	7.25	18.8/km^{2}
Serranillos	252	276	−8.7%	18.39	13.7/km^{2}
Sigeres	45	59	−23.7%	13.70	3.3/km^{2}
Sinlabajos	137	147	−6.8%	20.07	6.8/km^{2}
Solana de Ávila	100	141	−29.1%	68.37	1.5/km^{2}
Solana de Rioalmar	139	213	−34.7%	37.14	3.7/km^{2}
Solosancho	758	956	−20.7%	52.01	14.6/km^{2}
Sotalbo	250	249	+0.4%	90.34	2.8/km^{2}
Sotillo de la Adrada	4,967	4,803	+3.4%	43.20	115.0/km^{2}
El Tiemblo	4,548	4,412	+3.1%	75.59	60.2/km^{2}
Tiñosillos	759	812	−6.5%	27.25	27.9/km^{2}
Tolbaños	90	107	−15.9%	52.01	1.7/km^{2}
Tormellas	35	65	−46.2%	9.22	3.8/km^{2}
Tornadizos de Ávila	470	414	+13.5%	95.47	4.9/km^{2}
La Torre	216	276	−21.7%	58.37	3.7/km^{2}
Tórtoles	38	73	−47.9%	20.78	1.8/km^{2}
Umbrías	100	115	−13.0%	11.69	8.6/km^{2}
Vadillo de la Sierra	50	78	−35.9%	46.15	1.1/km^{2}
Valdecasa	56	70	−20.0%	21.79	2.6/km^{2}
Vega de Santa María	86	91	−5.5%	18.18	4.7/km^{2}
Velayos	218	266	−18.0%	20.45	10.7/km^{2}
Villaflor	99	133	−25.6%	18.48	5.4/km^{2}
Villafranca de la Sierra	135	153	−11.8%	39.34	3.4/km^{2}
Villanueva de Ávila	227	259	−12.4%	21.20	10.7/km^{2}
Villanueva de Gómez	116	145	−20.0%	21.10	5.5/km^{2}
Villanueva del Aceral	92	155	−40.6%	17.57	5.2/km^{2}
Villanueva del Campillo	101	113	−10.6%	45.99	2.2/km^{2}
Villar de Corneja	36	48	−25.0%	6.88	5.2/km^{2}
Villarejo del Valle	314	422	−25.6%	41.60	7.5/km^{2}
Villatoro	160	190	−15.8%	56.02	2.9/km^{2}
Viñegra de Moraña	52	57	−8.8%	10.25	5.1/km^{2}
Vita	76	93	−18.3%	16.59	4.6/km^{2}
Zapardiel de la Cañada	84	118	−28.8%	40.33	2.1/km^{2}
Zapardiel de la Ribera	91	121	−24.8%	43.88	2.1/km^{2}
Province of Ávila	160,463	171,647	−6.5%	8,049.04	19.9/km^{2}
Castile and León	2,391,682	2,540,188	−5.8%	93,864.10	25.5/km^{2}
Spain	48,619,695	46,815,916	+3.9%	504,755.17	96.3/km^{2}

== See also ==
- Geography of Spain
- List of municipalities of Spain
