= Constanzana =

- municipality
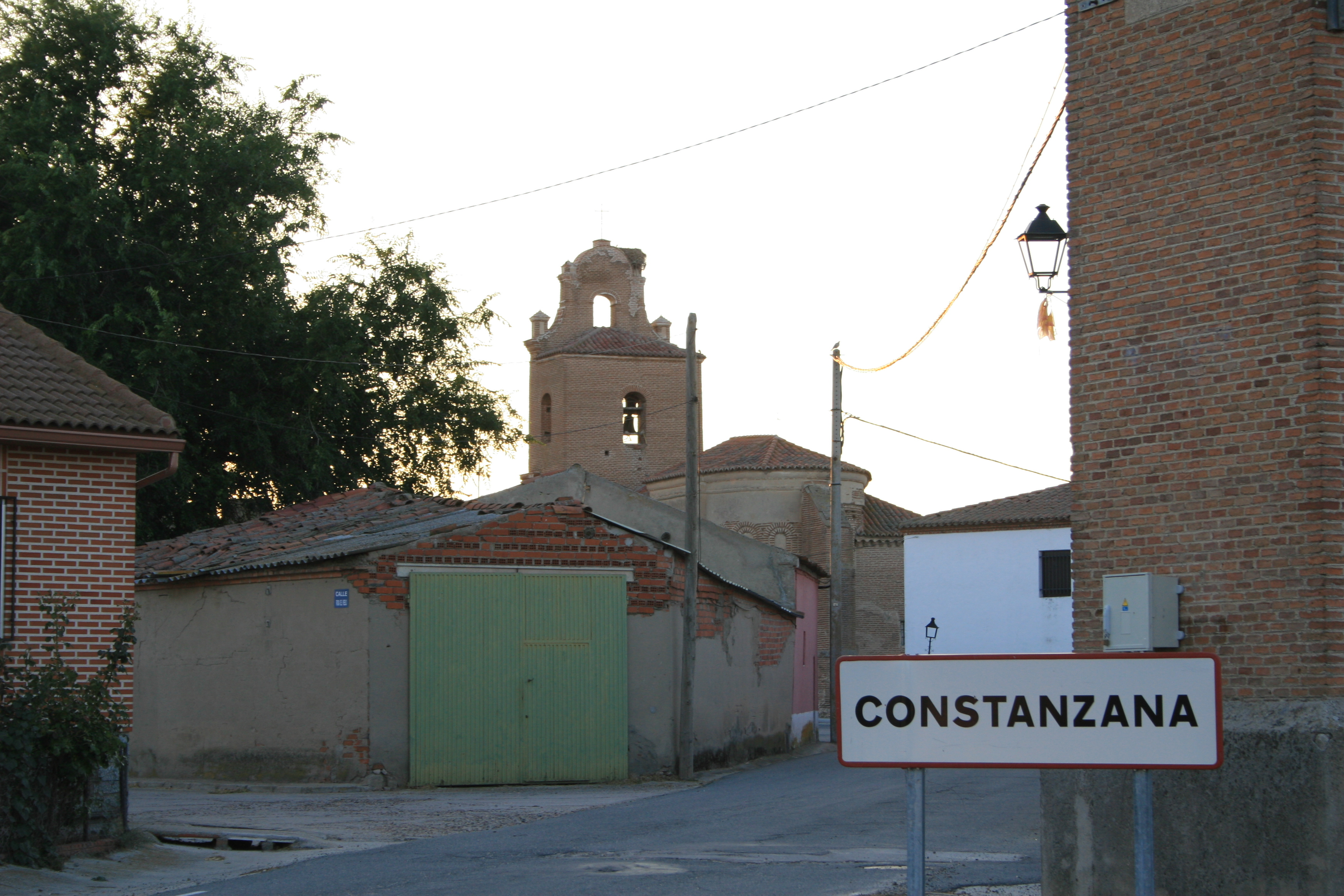
- View of Constanzana

- Flag Coat of arms

- Location in Spain. Constanzana (Spain)
- Coordinates: 40°56′19″N 4°52′28″W
- Country: Spain
- Autonomous community: Castile and León
- Province: Ávila
- Municipality: Constanzana

Area
  - Total: 26.85 km^{2} (10.37 sq mi)
- Elevation: 891 m (2,923 ft)

Population (2025-01-01)
  - Total: 104
  - Density: 3.87/km^{2} (10.0/sq mi)
- Time zone: UTC+1 (CET)
  - Summer (DST): UTC+2 (CEST)
- Website: Official website

Constanzana is a municipality located in the province of Ávila, Castile and León, Spain.

== Population ==
Historical population
Year	Pop.	±% p.a.
2023	98	—
2024	99	+1.02%
2025	104	+5.05%
Source: INE
