= Pozanco =

- municipality
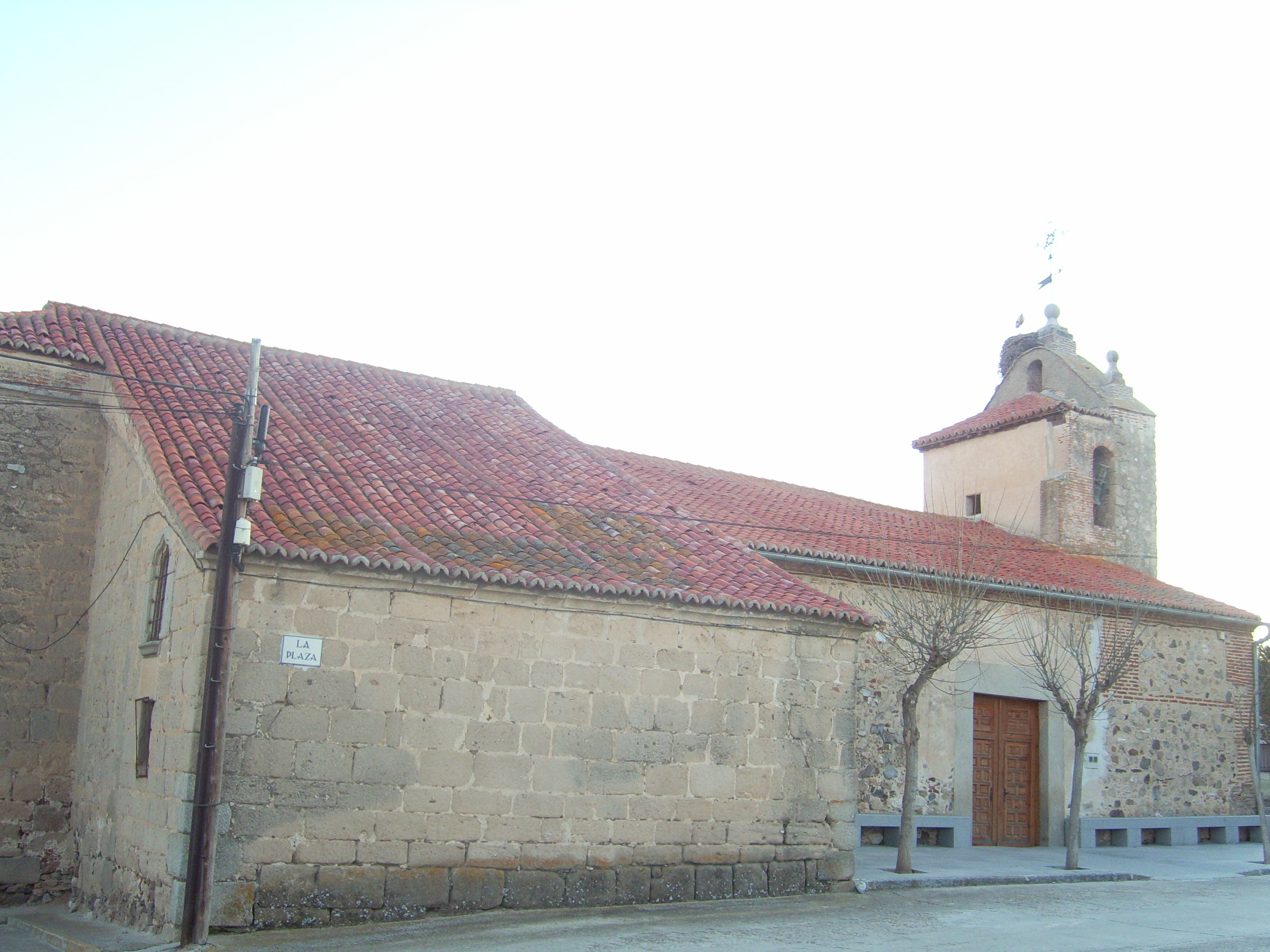
- Flag Coat of arms
- Location in Spain. Pozanco (Spain)
- Coordinates: 40°48′05″N 4°40′02″W
- Country: Spain
- Autonomous community: Castile and León
- Province: Ávila
- Municipality: Pozanco

Area
  - Total: 11 km^{2} (4.2 sq mi)

Population (2025-01-01)
  - Total: 57
  - Density: 5.2/km^{2} (13/sq mi)
- Time zone: UTC+1 (CET)
  - Summer (DST): UTC+2 (CEST)
- Website: Official website

Pozanco is a municipality located in the province of Ávila, Castile and León, Spain.

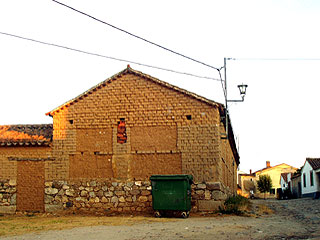
A typical house of Pozanco town.

== Population ==
Historical population
Year	Pop.	±% p.a.
2023	56	—
2024	60	+7.14%
2025	57	−5.00%
Source: INE
