= Muñico =

- municipality
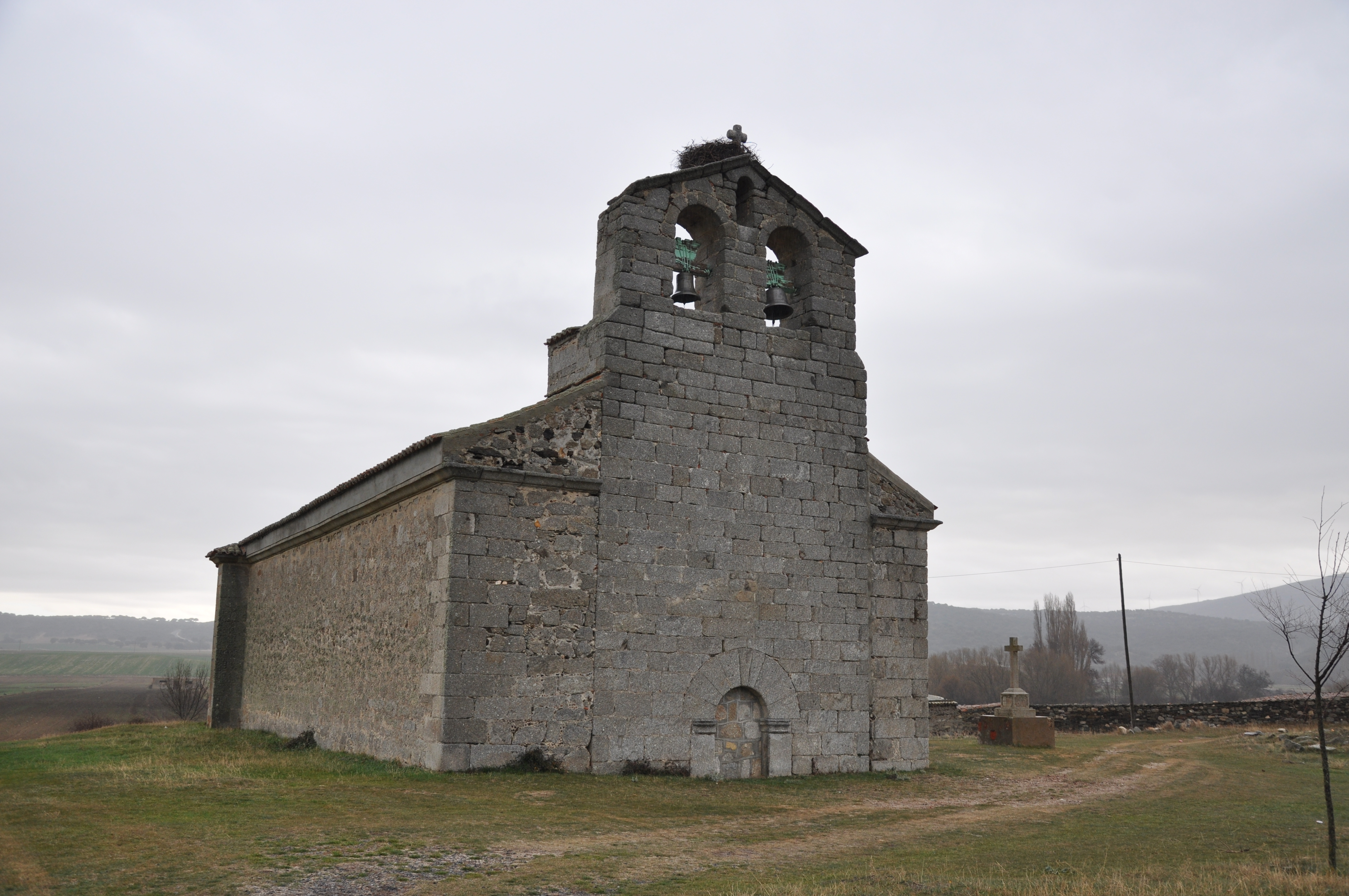
- Parish Church of Santo Domingo de Guzman

- Flag Coat of arms

- Location in Spain. Muñico (Spain)
- Coordinates: 40°42′17″N 5°01′36″W
- Country: Spain
- Autonomous community: Castile and León
- Province: Ávila
- Municipality: Muñico

Area
  - Total: 13 km^{2} (5.0 sq mi)

Population (2025-01-01)
  - Total: 77
  - Density: 5.9/km^{2} (15/sq mi)
- Time zone: UTC+1 (CET)
  - Summer (DST): UTC+2 (CEST)
- Website: Official website

Muñico is a municipality located in the province of Ávila, Castile and León, Spain.

== Population ==
Historical population
Year	Pop.	±% p.a.
2023	78	—
2024	80	+2.56%
2025	77	−3.75%
Source: INE
