= San García de Ingelmos =

- municipality
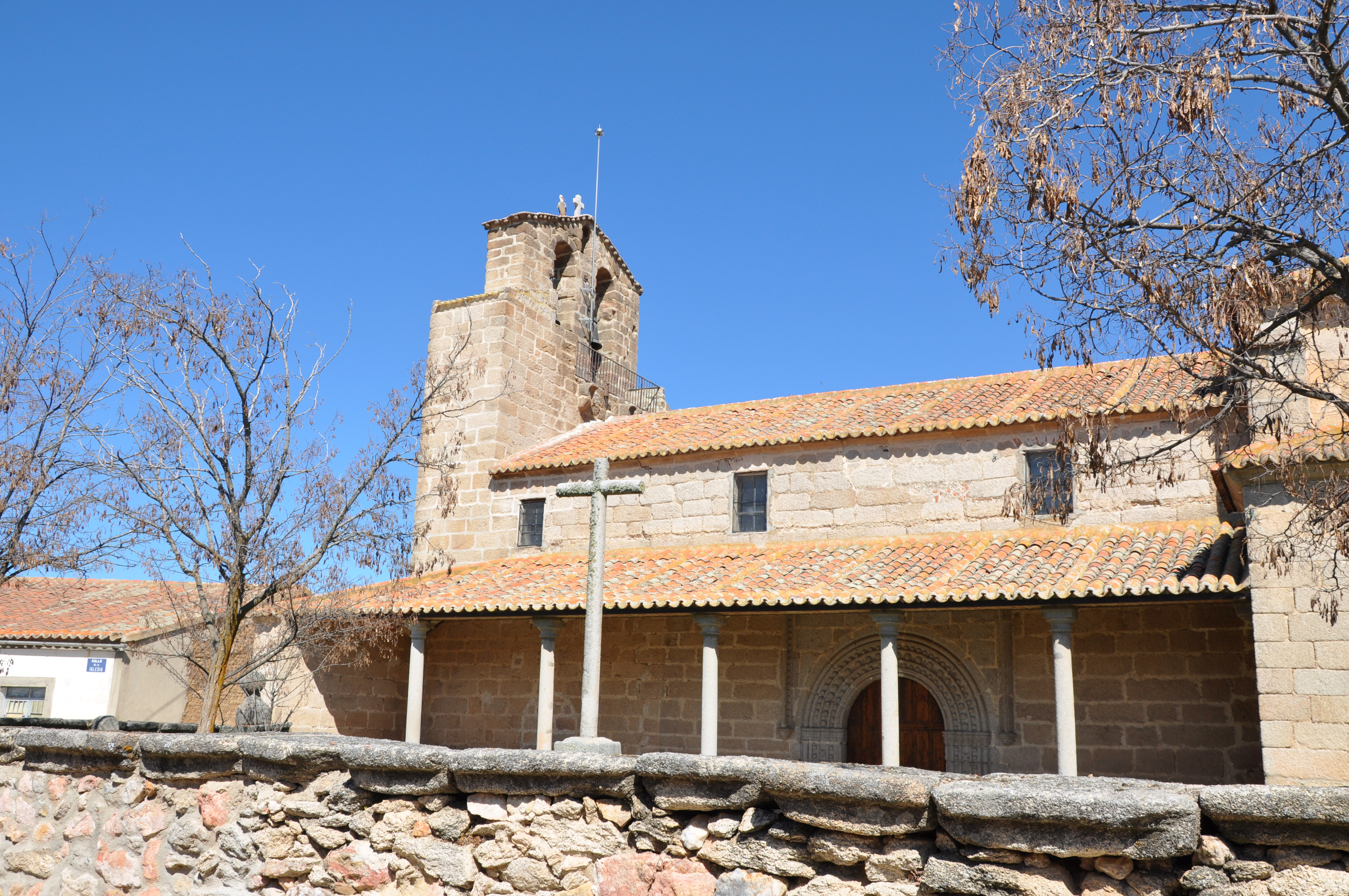
- Church of San Fabián and San Sebastián, San García de Ingelmos
- Flag Coat of arms
- Location in Spain. San García de Ingelmos (Spain)
- Coordinates: 40°46′11″N 5°06′59″W
- Country: Spain
- Autonomous community: Castile and León
- Province: Ávila
- Municipality: San García de Ingelmos

Area
  - Total: 38 km^{2} (15 sq mi)

Population (2025-01-01)
  - Total: 64
  - Density: 1.7/km^{2} (4.4/sq mi)
- Time zone: UTC+1 (CET)
  - Summer (DST): UTC+2 (CEST)
- Website: Official website

San García de Ingelmos is a municipality located in the province of Ávila, Castile and León, Spain.

== Population ==
Historical population
Year	Pop.	±% p.a.
2023	70	—
2024	66	−5.71%
2025	64	−3.03%
Source: INE
