= Gallegos de Altamiros =

- municipality
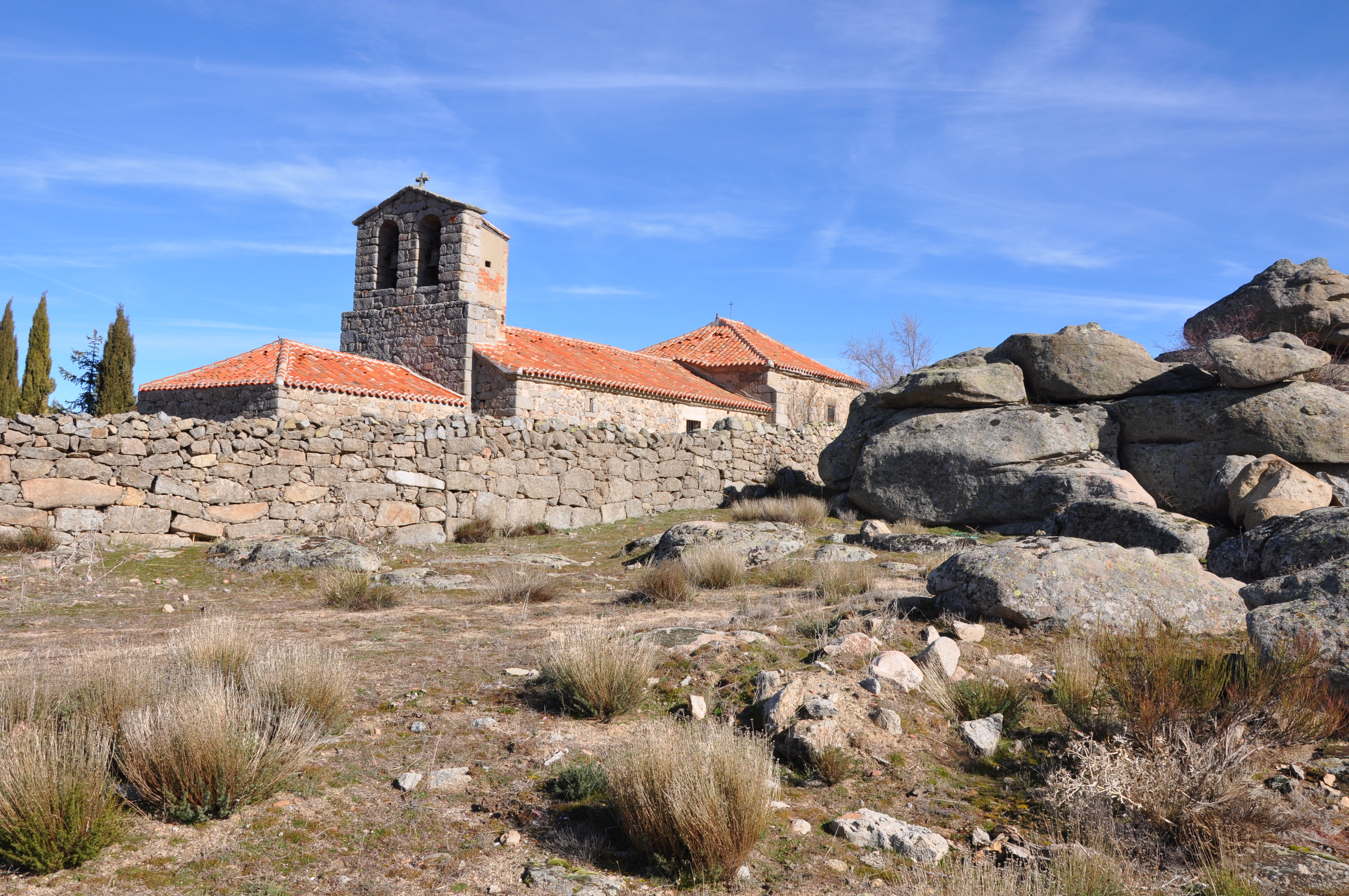
- Church of the Assumption

- Flag Coat of arms

- Location in Spain. Gallegos de Altamiros (Spain)
- Coordinates: 40°42′35″N 4°53′56″W
- Country: Spain
- Autonomous community: Castile and León
- Province: Ávila
- Municipality: Gallegos de Altamiros

Area
  - Total: 20.0 km^{2} (7.7 sq mi)
- Elevation: 1,255 m (4,117 ft)

Population (2025-01-01)
  - Total: 61
  - Density: 3.1/km^{2} (7.9/sq mi)
- Time zone: UTC+1 (CET)
  - Summer (DST): UTC+2 (CEST)
- Website: Official website

Gallegos de Altamiros is a municipality located in the province of Ávila, Castile and León, Spain.

== Population ==
Historical population
Year	Pop.	±% p.a.
2023	58	—
2024	60	+3.45%
2025	61	+1.67%
Source: INE
