= Tiñosillos =

- municipality
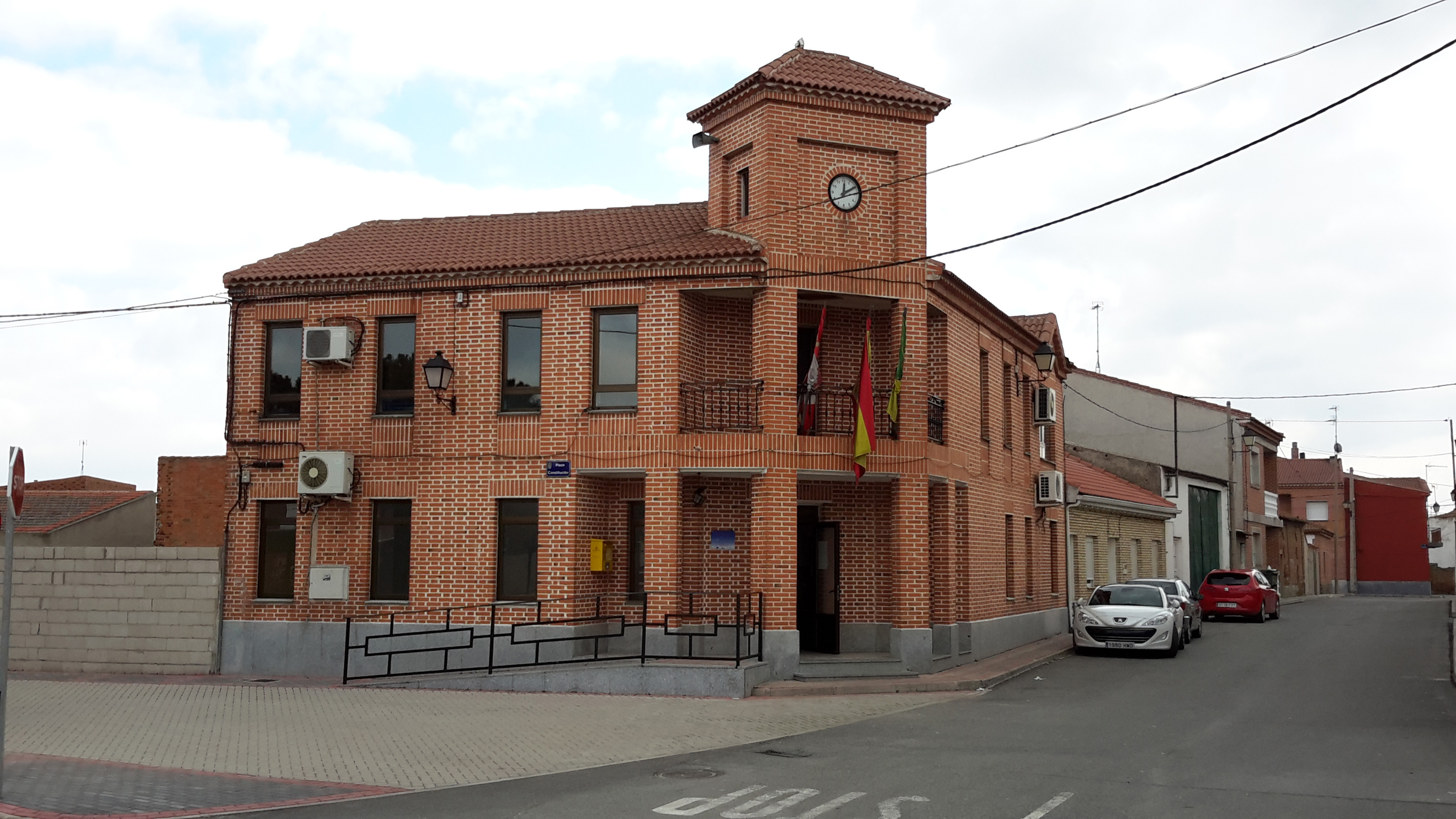
- Town hall of Tiñosillos

- Flag Coat of arms

- Location in Spain. Tiñosillos (Spain)
- Coordinates: 40°56′03″N 4°43′39″W
- Country: Spain
- Autonomous community: Castile and León
- Province: Ávila
- Municipality: Tiñosillos

Area
  - Total: 27 km^{2} (10 sq mi)

Population (2025-01-01)
  - Total: 732
  - Density: 27/km^{2} (70/sq mi)
- Time zone: UTC+1 (CET)
  - Summer (DST): UTC+2 (CEST)
- Website: Official website

Tiñosillos is a municipality in the province of Ávila, Castile and León, Spain.

== Population ==
Historical population
Year	Pop.	±% p.a.
2023	759	—
2024	756	−0.40%
2025	732	−3.17%
Source: INE
