= Brabos =

- municipality
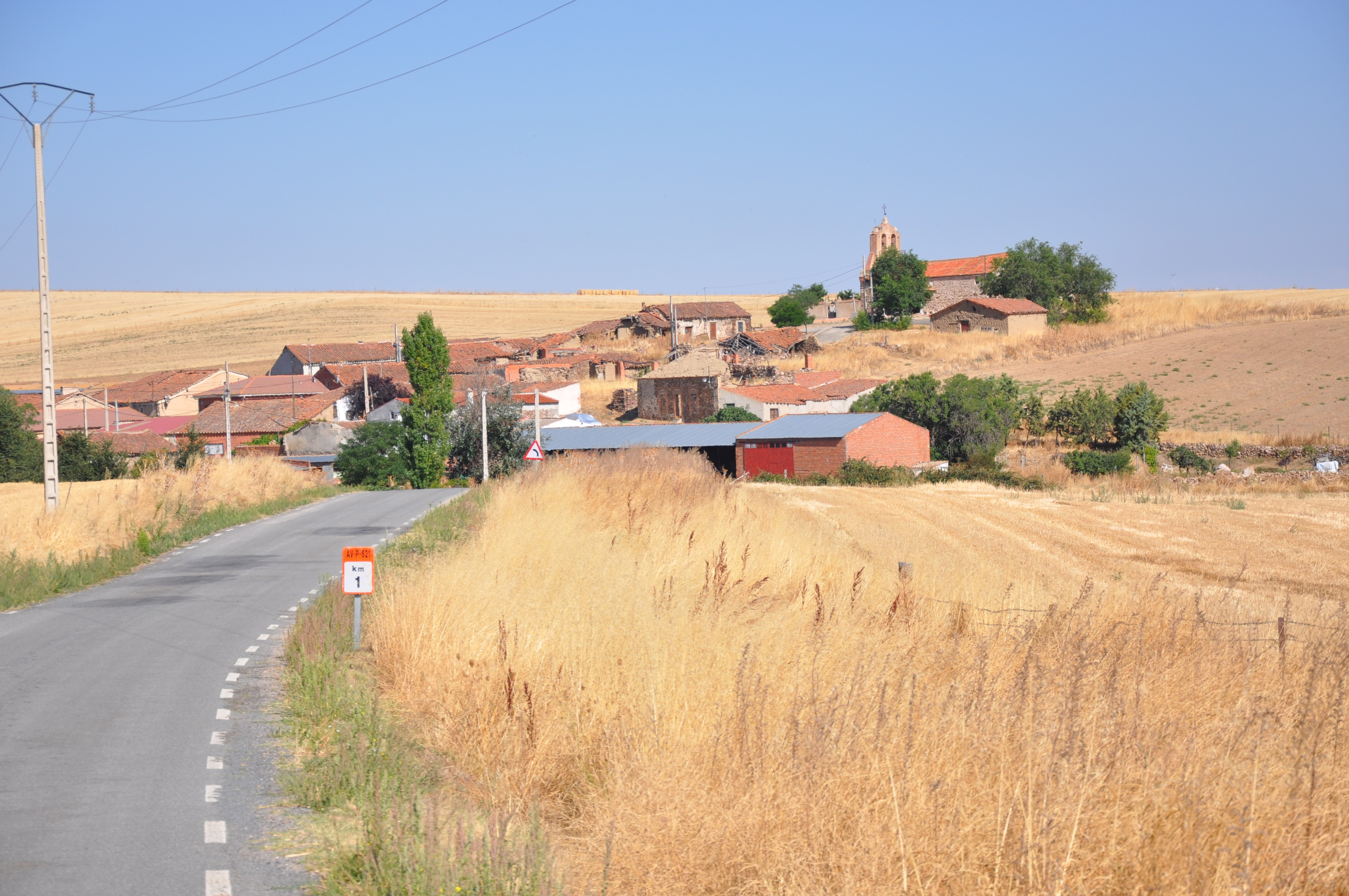
- Brabos, Avila province
- Flag Coat of arms
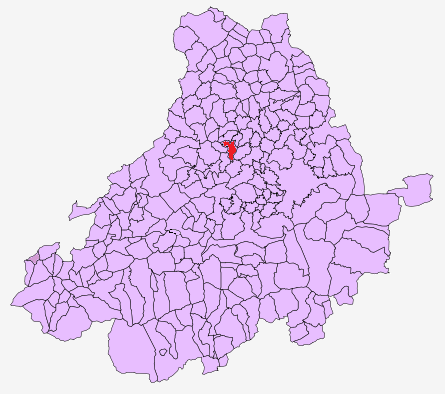
- Extension of the municipal term within the province of Ávila

- Location in Spain. Brabos (Spain)
- Coordinates: 40°46′42″N 4°56′16″W
- Country: Spain
- Autonomous community: Castile and León
- Province: Ávila
- Municipality: Brabos

Government
  - Mayoress: Luzdivina Nieto Jiménez

Area
  - Total: 18.35 km^{2} (7.08 sq mi)
- Elevation: 995 m (3,264 ft)

Population (2025-01-01)
  - Total: 34
  - Density: 1.9/km^{2} (4.8/sq mi)
- Time zone: UTC+1 (CET)
  - Summer (DST): UTC+2 (CEST)
- Website: Official website

Brabos is a municipality located in the province of Ávila, Castile and León, Spain. According to the 2006 census (INE), the municipality had a population of 62 inhabitants.

== Population ==
Historical population
| Year | Pop. | ±% p.a. |
|---|---|---|
| 2023 | 39 | — |
| 2024 | 35 | −10.26% |
| 2025 | 34 | −2.86% |
Source: INE

== Monuments ==
- Immaculate Conception Church
- Shrines of Santa María del Cerro and San Miguel de Otero
- Pensioners' home
- Main Square
- Fountain

== Customs ==
- During festivities (either national or local patron's festivities), neighbours gather to share food.
- Climbing the holy hill to take part in mass and a later procession downhill, which is attended by neighbouring townsfolk.
- Merrymaking at the constitution bridge.
- During the last weekend in August or the first in September the whole town partakes in a big traditional celebration.
