= Muñosancho =

- municipality
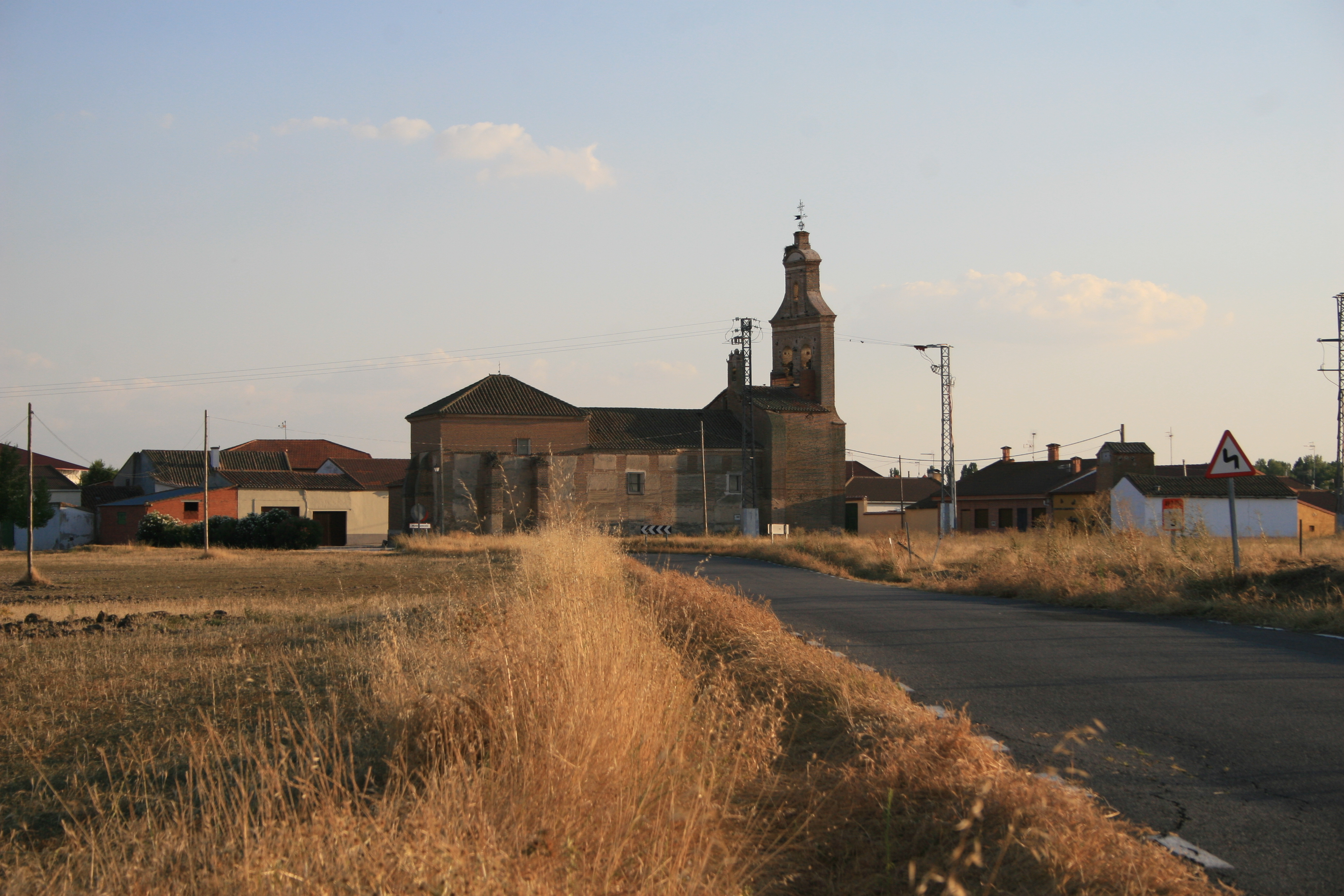
- Street of Muñosancho
- Flag Coat of arms
- Location in Spain. Muñosancho (Spain)
- Coordinates: 40°55′19″N 5°02′09″W
- Country: Spain
- Autonomous community: Castile and León
- Province: Ávila
- Municipality: Muñosancho

Area
  - Total: 19 km^{2} (7.3 sq mi)

Population (2025-01-01)
  - Total: 87
  - Density: 4.6/km^{2} (12/sq mi)
- Time zone: UTC+1 (CET)
  - Summer (DST): UTC+2 (CEST)
- Website: Official website

Muñosancho is a municipality located in the province of Ávila, Castile and León, Spain.

== Population ==
Historical population
| Year | Pop. | ±% p.a. |
|---|---|---|
| 2023 | 88 | — |
| 2024 | 88 | +0.00% |
| 2025 | 87 | −1.14% |
Source: INE
