= Mengamuñoz =

- municipality
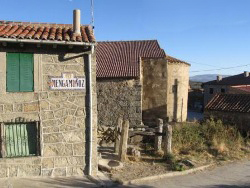
- Houses of Mengamuñoz

- Flag Coat of arms

- Location in Spain. Mengamuñoz (Spain)
- Coordinates: 40°30′N 5°00′W
- Country: Spain
- Autonomous community: Castile and León
- Province: Ávila
- Municipality: Mengamuñoz

Area
  - Total: 11.75 km^{2} (4.54 sq mi)
- Elevation: 1,312 m (4,304 ft)

Population (2025-01-01)
  - Total: 60
  - Density: 5.1/km^{2} (13/sq mi)
- Time zone: UTC+1 (CET)
  - Summer (DST): UTC+2 (CEST)
- Website: Official website

Mengamuñoz is a municipality located in the province of Ávila, Castile and León, Spain.

== Population ==
Historical population
Year	Pop.	±% p.a.
2023	56	—
2024	54	−3.57%
2025	60	+11.11%
Source: INE
