= Pascualcobo =

- municipality
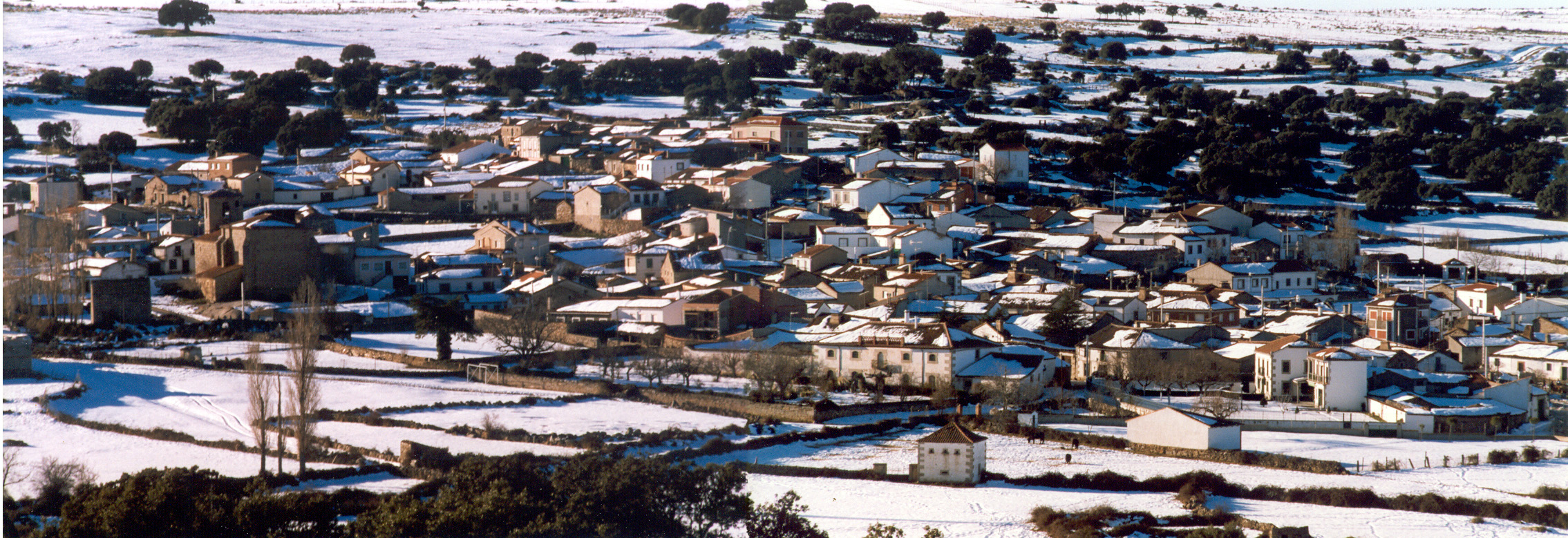
- Panoramic view of Pascualcobo.

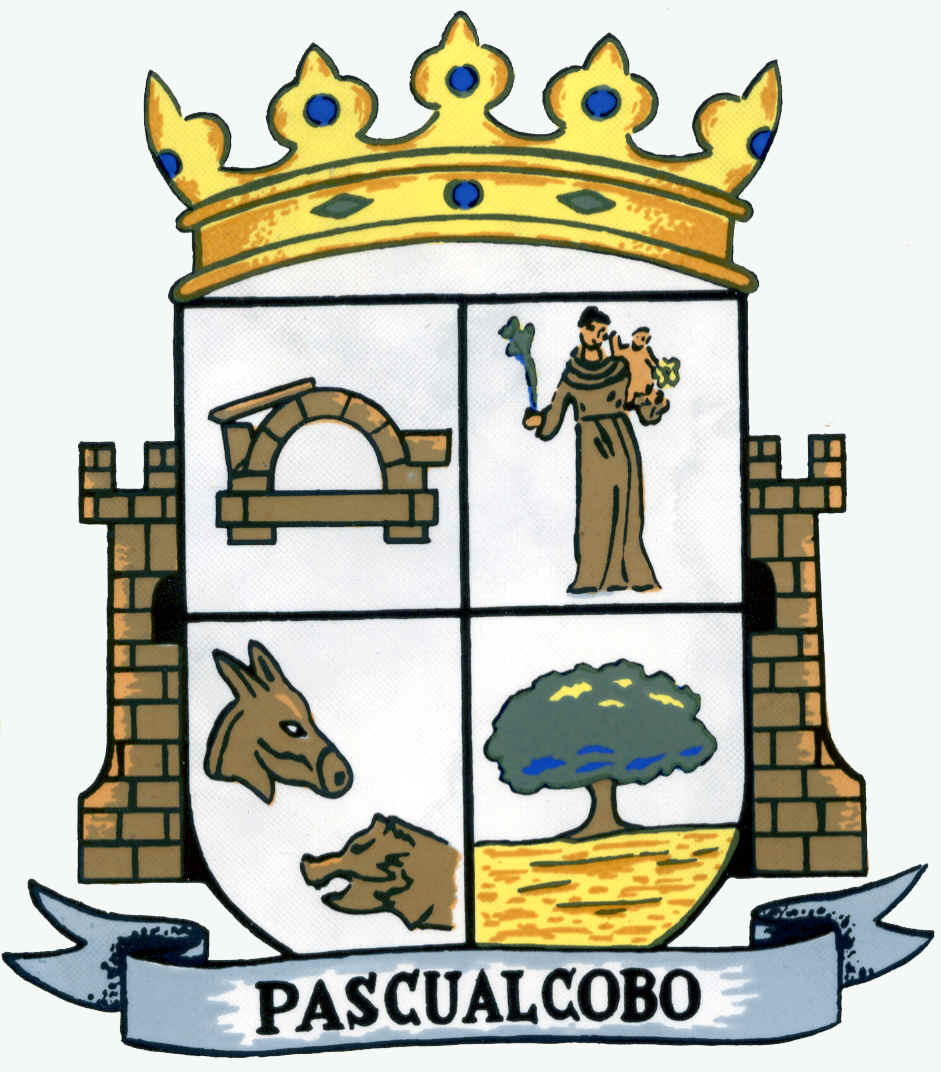
- Flag Coat of arms

- Location in Spain. Pascualcobo (Spain)
- Coordinates: 40°39′25″N 5°16′37″W
- Country: Spain
- Autonomous community: Castile and León
- Province: Ávila
- Municipality: Pascualcobo

Area
  - Total: 16 km^{2} (6.2 sq mi)

Population (2025-01-01)
  - Total: 38
  - Density: 2.4/km^{2} (6.2/sq mi)
- Time zone: UTC+1 (CET)
  - Summer (DST): UTC+2 (CEST)
- Website: Official website

Pascualcobo is a municipality located in the province of Ávila, Castile and León, Spain.

== Population ==
Historical population
Year	Pop.	±% p.a.
2023	38	—
2024	39	+2.63%
2025	38	−2.56%
Source: INE
