= Manjabálago =

- municipality
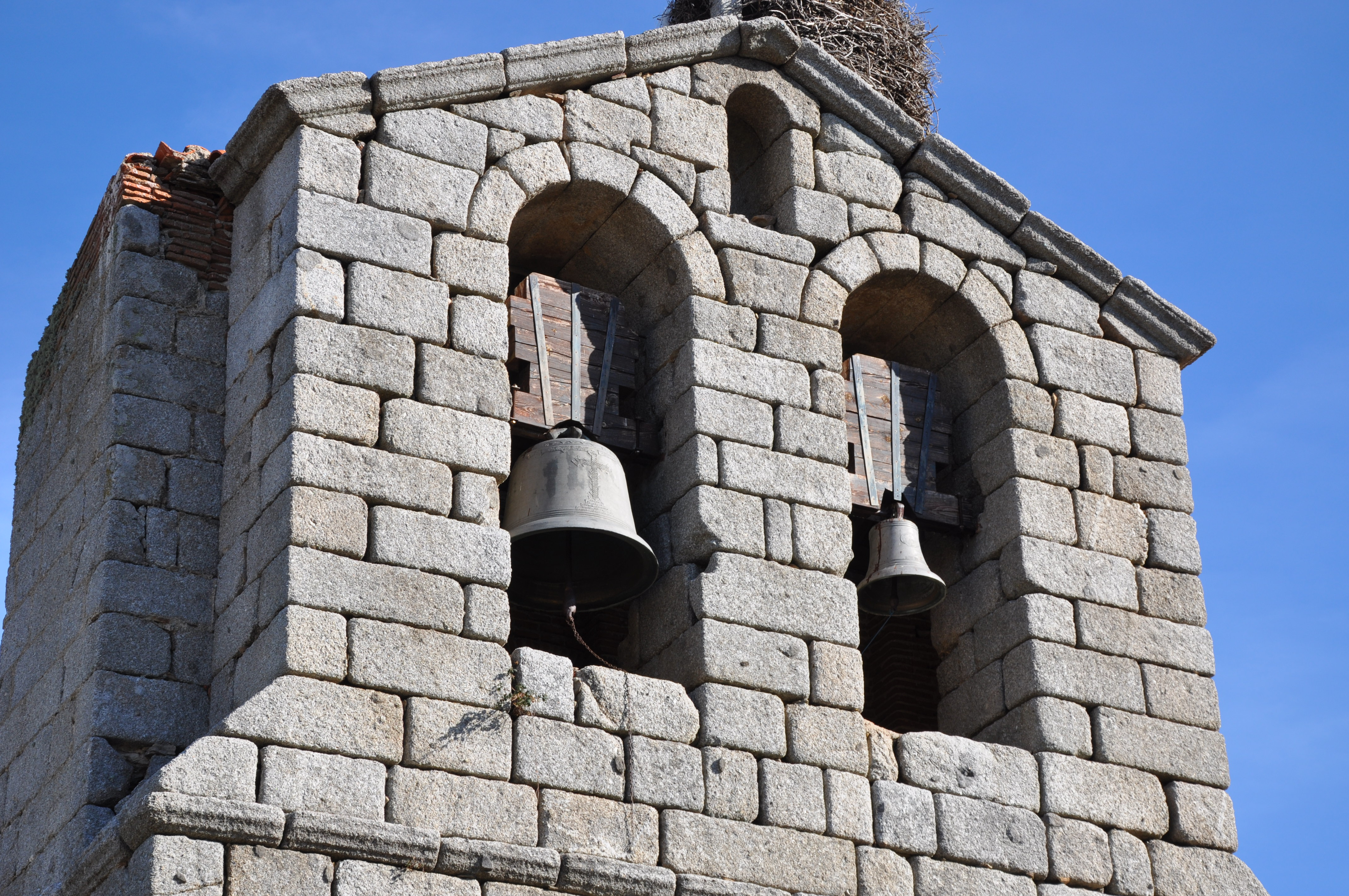
- Bell tower of San Miguel church.

- Coat of arms

- Extension of the municipal term within the province of Ávila

- Location in Spain. Manjabálago (Spain)
- Coordinates: 40°39′52″N 5°04′34″W
- Country: Spain
- Autonomous community: Castile and León
- Province: Ávila
- Municipality: Manjabálago

Area
  - Total: 17 km^{2} (6.6 sq mi)

Population (2025-01-01)
  - Total: 22
  - Density: 1.3/km^{2} (3.4/sq mi)
- Time zone: UTC+1 (CET)
  - Summer (DST): UTC+2 (CEST)
- Website: Official website

Manjabálago (Spanish pronunciation: [maŋxaˈβalaɣo]) is a municipality located in the province of Ávila, Castile and León, Spain.

== Population ==
Historical population
Year	Pop.	±% p.a.
2023	36	—
2024	26	−27.78%
2025	22	−15.38%
Source: INE
