= Navadijos =

- municipality
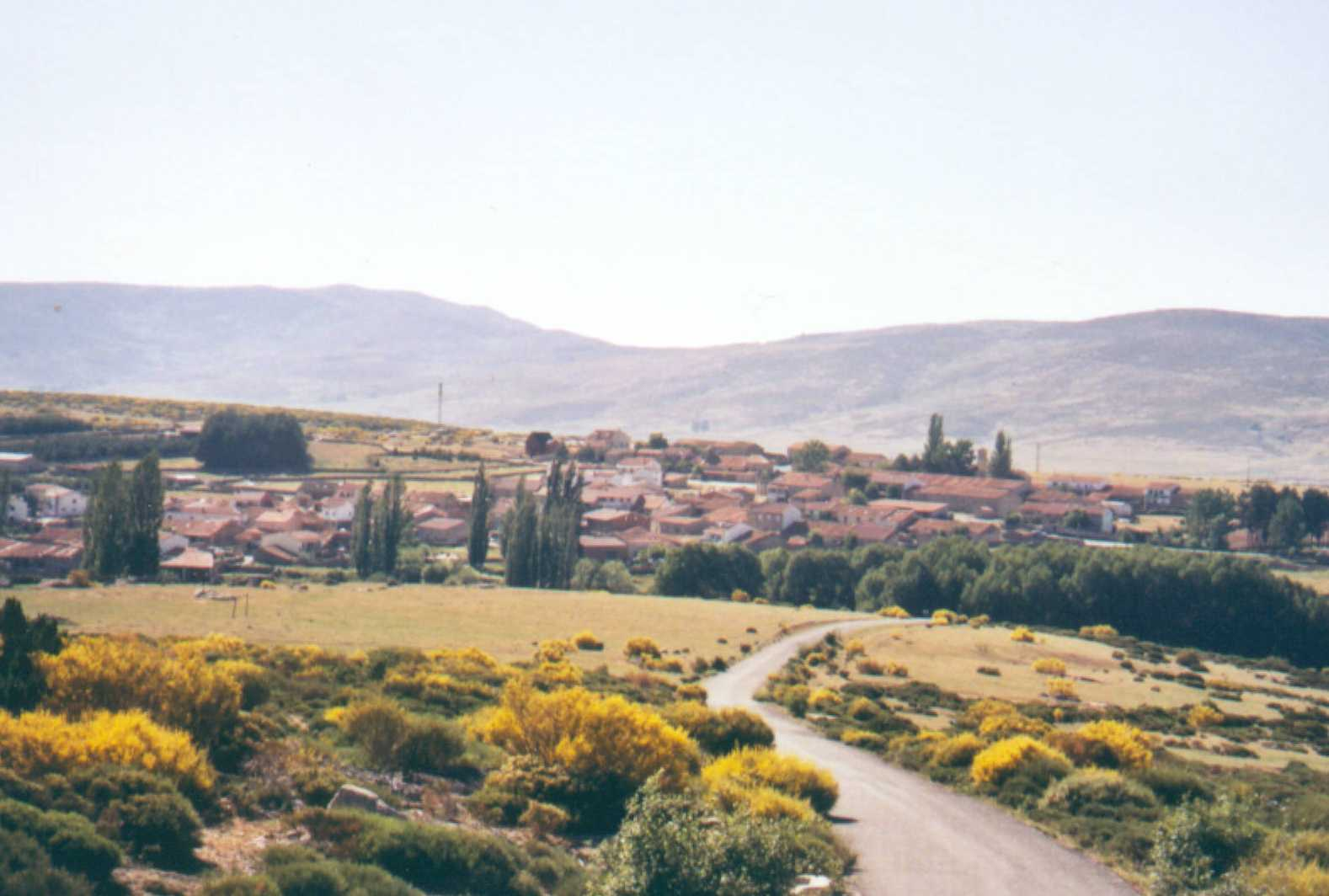
- Panoramic view of Navadijos

- Flag Coat of arms

- Location in Spain. Navadijos (Spain)
- Coordinates: 40°25′33″N 5°05′01″W
- Country: Spain
- Autonomous community: Castile and León
- Province: Ávila
- Municipality: Navadijos

Area
  - Total: 19 km^{2} (7.3 sq mi)

Population (2025-01-01)
  - Total: 29
  - Density: 1.5/km^{2} (4.0/sq mi)
- Time zone: UTC+1 (CET)
  - Summer (DST): UTC+2 (CEST)
- Website: Official website

Navadijos is a municipality located in the province of Ávila, Castile and León, Spain.

== Population ==
Historical population
Year	Pop.	±% p.a.
2023	39	—
2024	29	−25.64%
2025	29	+0.00%
Source: INE
