= Hernansancho =

- Municipality and Town
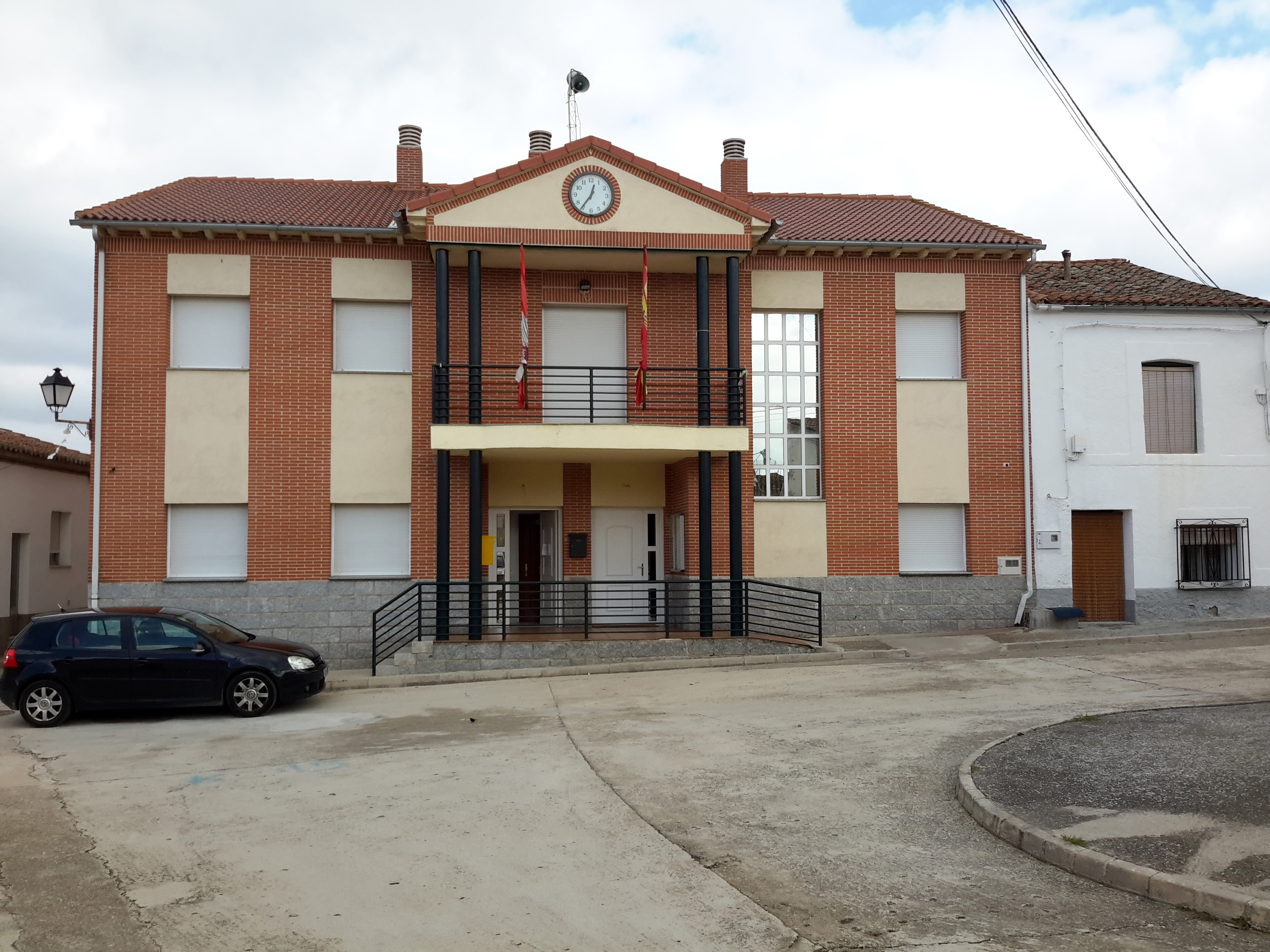

- Location in Spain. Hernansancho (Spain)
- Coordinates: 40°51′27″N 4°43′46″W
- Country: Spain
- Autonomous community: Castile and León
- Province: Ávila
- Comarca: La Moraña
- Municipality: Hernansancho

Government
  - Alcalde (Mayor): Luciano Arroyo Martín (PSOE)

Area
  - Total: 19.38 km^{2} (7.48 sq mi)
- Elevation: 900 m (3,000 ft)

Population (2025-01-01)
  - Total: 140
  - Density: 7.2/km^{2} (19/sq mi)
- Time zone: UTC+1 (CET)
  - Summer (DST): UTC+2 (CEST)
- Website: Official website

Hernansancho is a municipality located in the province of Ávila, Castile and León, Spain.

== Population ==
Historical population
Year	Pop.	±% p.a.
2023	147	—
2024	142	−3.40%
2025	140	−1.41%
Source: INE
