= Tórtoles de la Sierra =

- municipality
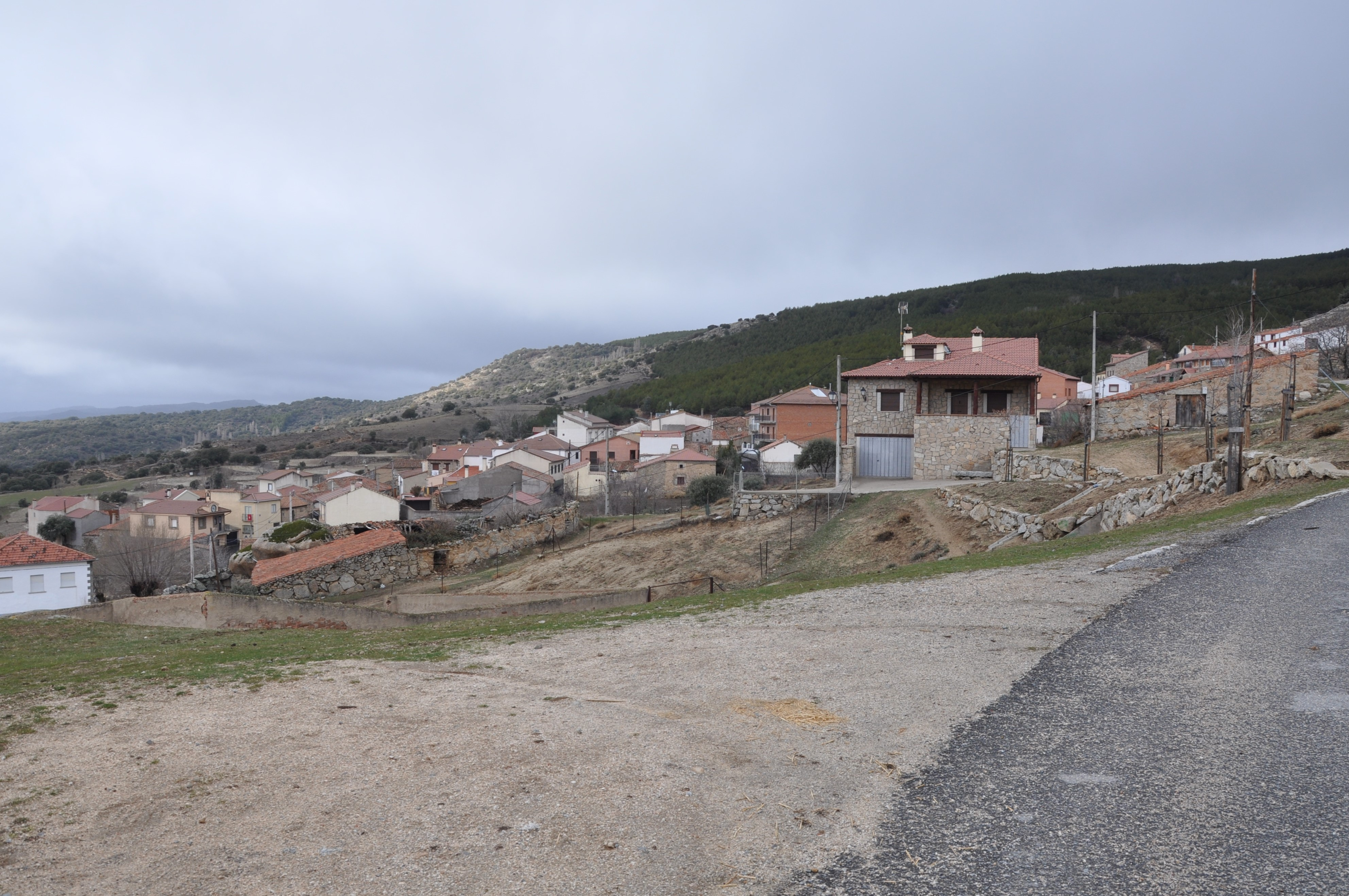
- Panorama, Tórtoles de la Sierra, Ávila
- Flag Coat of arms
- Location in Spain. Tórtoles de la Sierra (Spain)
- Coordinates: 40°33′39″N 5°15′42″W
- Country: Spain
- Autonomous community: Castile and León
- Province: Ávila
- Comarca: Comarca de El Barco de Ávila - Piedrahíta
- Municipality: Tórtoles de la Sierra

Area
  - Total: 20 km^{2} (7.7 sq mi)

Population (2025-01-01)
  - Total: 37
  - Density: 1.8/km^{2} (4.8/sq mi)
- Time zone: UTC+1 (CET)
  - Summer (DST): UTC+2 (CEST)

Tórtoles de la Sierra is a village and municipality located in the Comarca de El Barco de Ávila - Piedrahíta comarca, province of Ávila, in Castile and León, Spain.

== Population ==
Historical population
| Year | Pop. | ±% p.a. |
|---|---|---|
| 2023 | 37 | — |
| 2024 | 38 | +2.70% |
| 2025 | 37 | −2.63% |
Source: INE
