= El Bohodón =

- Municipality
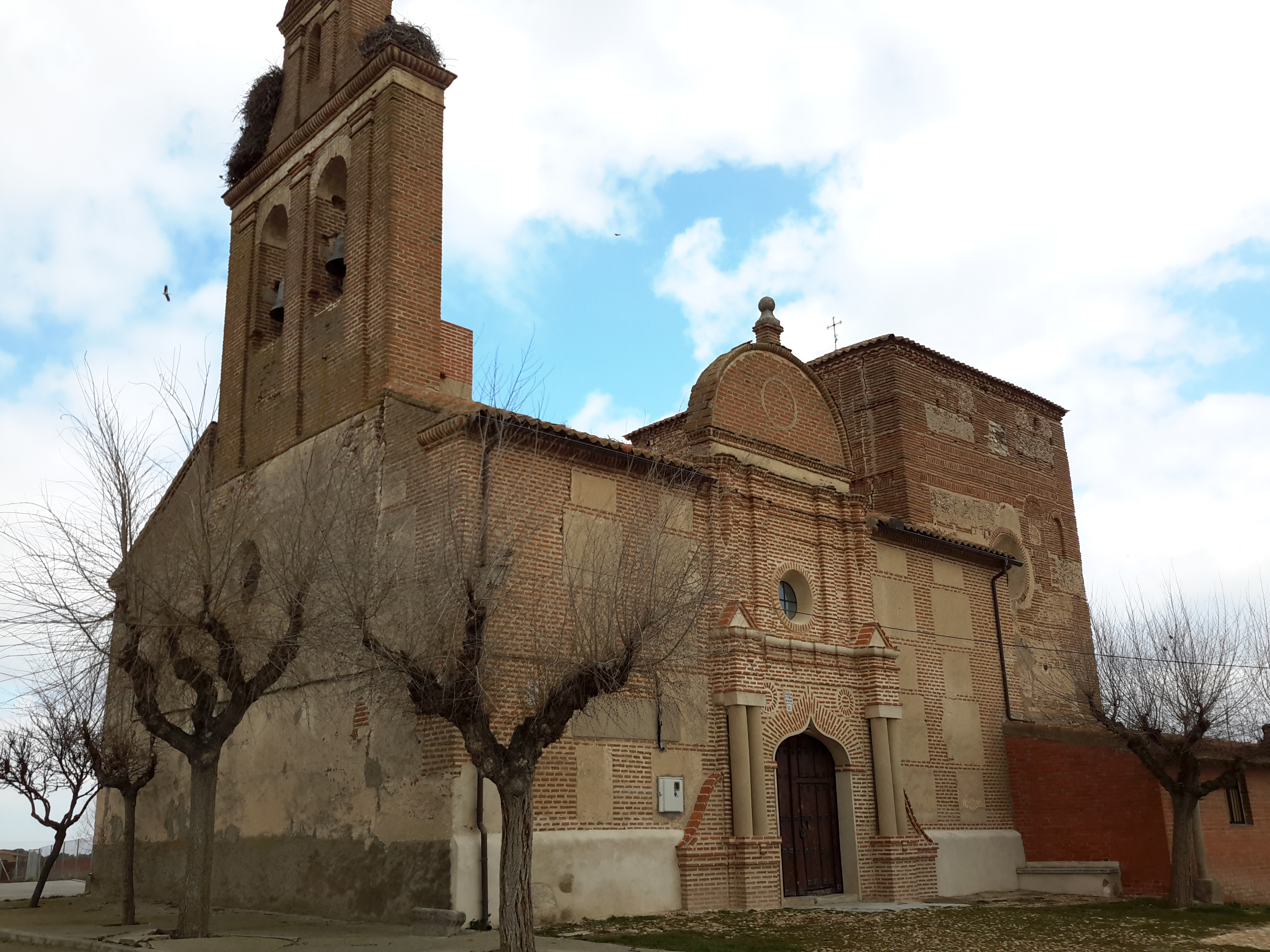
- Church of Our lady of the Assumption in El Bohodón

- Flag Coat of arms

- Location in Spain. El Bohodón (Spain)
- Coordinates: 40°54′58″N 4°43′43″W
- Country: Spain
- Autonomous community: Castile and León
- Province: Ávila
- Municipality: El Bohodón

Area
  - Total: 22.09 km^{2} (8.53 sq mi)
- Elevation: 884 m (2,900 ft)

Population (2025-01-01)
  - Total: 104
  - Density: 4.71/km^{2} (12.2/sq mi)
- Time zone: UTC+1 (CET)
  - Summer (DST): UTC+2 (CEST)
- Website: Official website

El Bohodón is a municipality located in the province of Ávila, Castile and León, Spain.

== Population ==
Historical population
Year	Pop.	±% p.a.
2023	107	—
2024	110	+2.80%
2025	104	−5.45%
Source: INE
