= Barromán =

- municipality
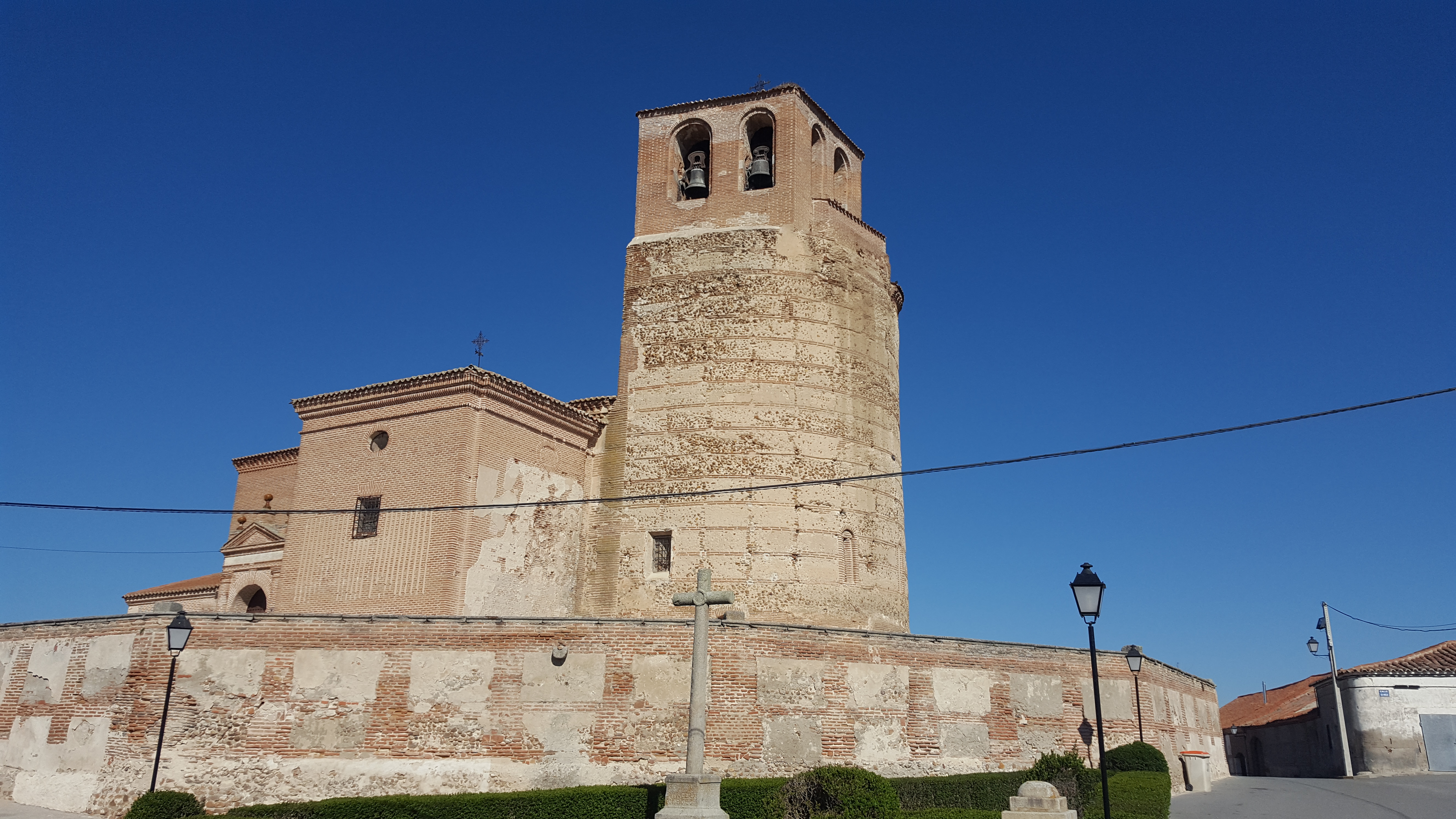
- Church Mudéjar of the Assumption

- Coat of arms

- Extension of the municipal term within the province of Ávila

- Location in Spain. Barromán (Spain)
- Coordinates: 41°03′54″N 4°55′53″W
- Country: Spain
- Autonomous community: Castile and León
- Province: Ávila
- Municipality: Barromán

Area
  - Total: 20.03 km^{2} (7.73 sq mi)
- Elevation: 800 m (2,600 ft)

Population (2025-01-01)
  - Total: 174
  - Density: 8.69/km^{2} (22.5/sq mi)
- Time zone: UTC+1 (CET)
  - Summer (DST): UTC+2 (CEST)
- Website: Official website

Barromán is a municipality located in the province of Ávila, Castile and León, Spain. According to the 2025 census (INE), the municipality had a population of 174 inhabitants.

== Geography ==
The rivers are the Zapardiel River [es], a tributary of the Douro (Duero) and Valtodano [es], a tributary of the Zapardiel. Camilo José Cela, in his book Jews, Moors and Christians, narrates a trip he made through the lands of Segovia and Ávila, between 1946 and 1952. One of the places he passed through was Barromán.

According to popular tradition, the place name is a contraction of the word "Lugar de Román" in old Castilian. It was incorporated into Castile and repopulated by Castilian settlers in the 11th century, with no known settlement prior to the reconquest, although remains of Roman buildings have been found in two nearby municipalities (Palacios de Goda and Bercial de Zapardiel) that probably continued to be used in Visigothic times and were finally abandoned after the Islamic invasion.

== Heritage ==
Church of the Assumption, in Mudejar style (apse-tower) from the 12th or 13th centuries, possibly the remains of a castle or a watchtower, and main nave from the 16th century. The entire church is built on a gentle hill or mound from which it dominates almost the entire town.

== Population ==
Historical population
Year	Pop.	±%
1877	483	—
1887	474	−1.9%
1897	514	+8.4%
1900	512	−0.4%
1910	588	+14.8%
1920	523	−11.1%
1930	508	−2.9%
1940	575	+13.2%
1950	666	+15.8%
1960	525	−21.2%
1970	444	−15.4%
1981	368	−17.1%
1991	297	−19.3%
2001	251	−15.5%
2011	203	−19.1%
2021	181	−10.8%
2023	176	−2.8%
2024	175	−0.6%
2025	174	−0.6%
