= Navaescurial =

- municipality
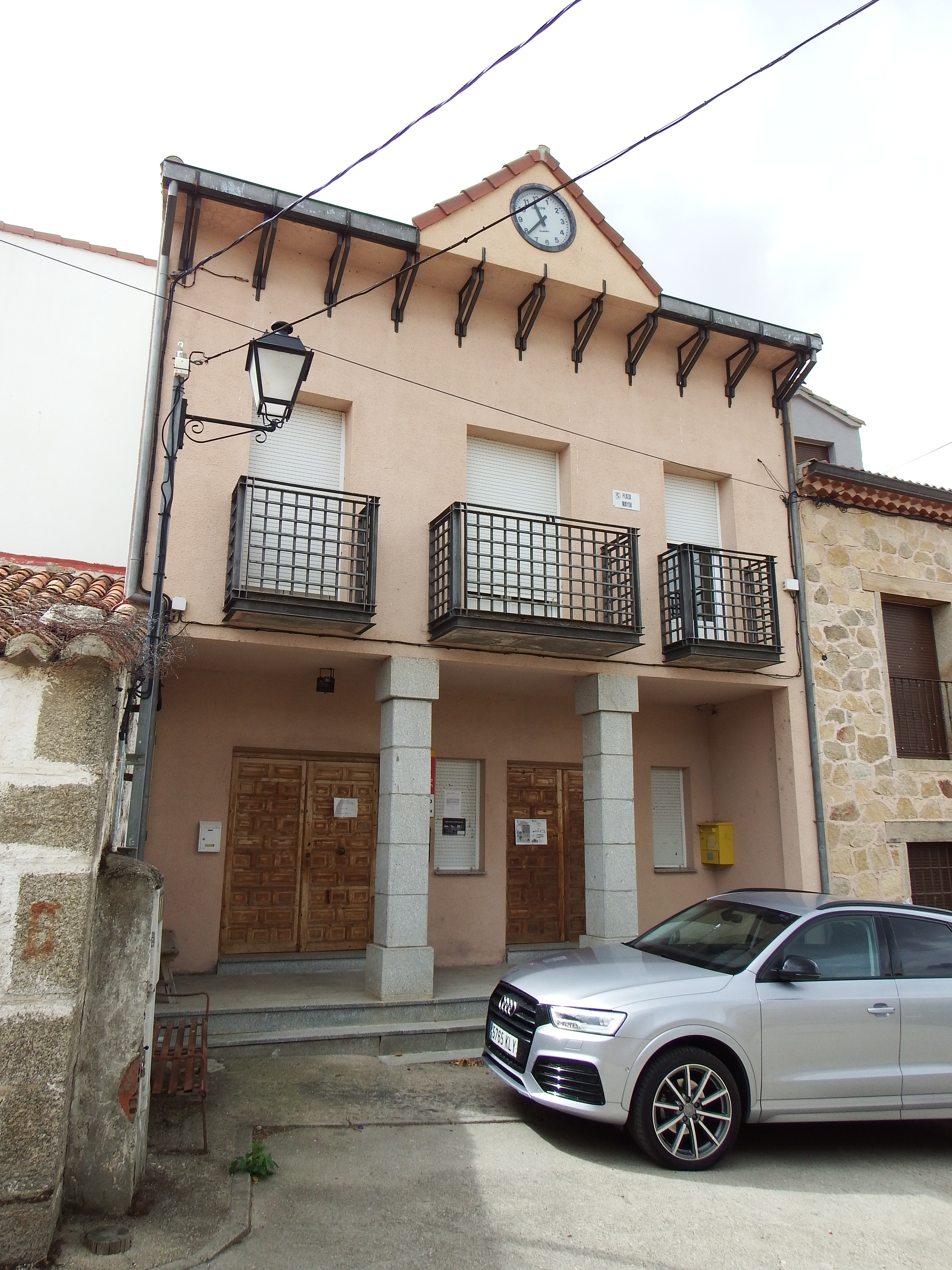
- Town hall

- Location in Spain. Navaescurial (Spain)
- Coordinates: 40°28′19″N 5°16′40″W
- Country: Spain
- Autonomous community: Castile and León
- Province: Ávila

Area
  - Total: 35 km^{2} (14 sq mi)

Population (2025-01-01)
  - Total: 54
  - Density: 1.5/km^{2} (4.0/sq mi)
- Time zone: UTC+1 (CET)
  - Summer (DST): UTC+2 (CEST)
- Website: Official website

Navaescurial is a municipality located in the province of Ávila, Castile and León, Spain.

== Population ==
Historical population
Year	Pop.	±% p.a.
2023	52	—
2024	53	+1.92%
2025	54	+1.89%
Source: INE
