= Mironcillo =

- municipality
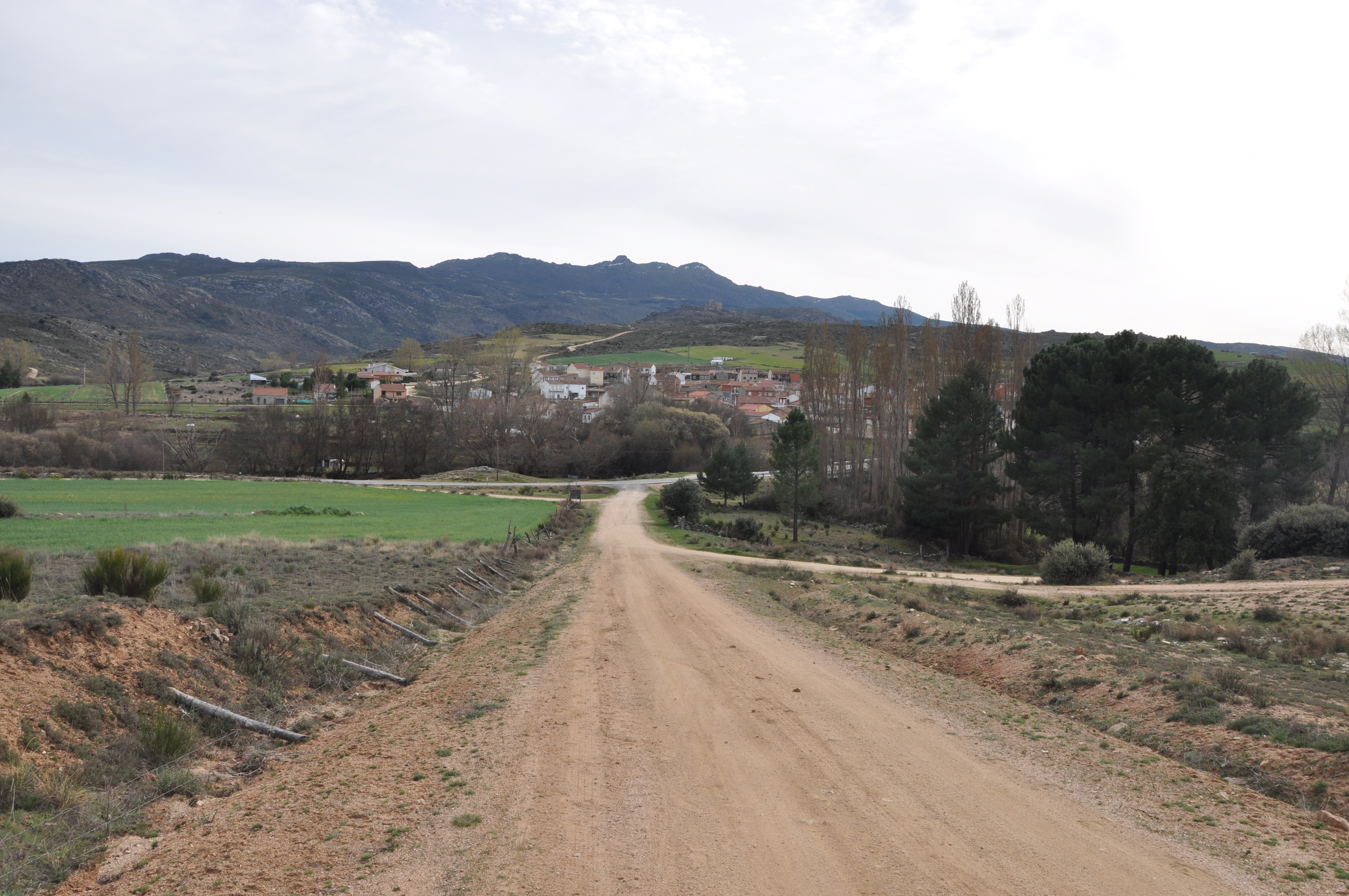
- Mironcillo, Ávila

- Location in Spain. Mironcillo (Spain)
- Coordinates: 40°33′18″N 4°49′32″W
- Country: Spain
- Autonomous community: Castile and León
- Province: Ávila

Area
  - Total: 15 km^{2} (5.8 sq mi)

Population (2025-01-01)
  - Total: 110
  - Density: 7.3/km^{2} (19/sq mi)
- Time zone: UTC+1 (CET)
  - Summer (DST): UTC+2 (CEST)

Mironcillo is a municipality located in the province of Ávila, Castile and León, Spain.

== Population ==
Historical population
Year	Pop.	±% p.a.
2023	109	—
2024	112	+2.75%
2025	110	−1.79%
Source: INE

== Gallery ==
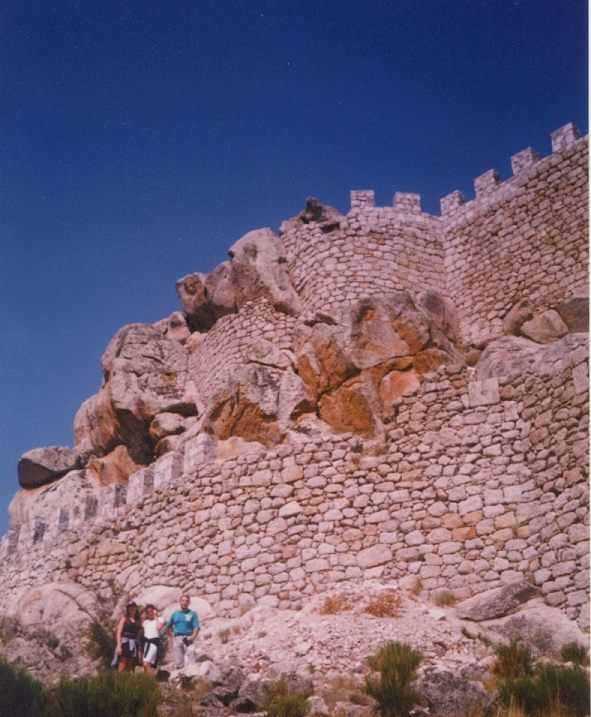
Part of the 'Castle of Mironcillo

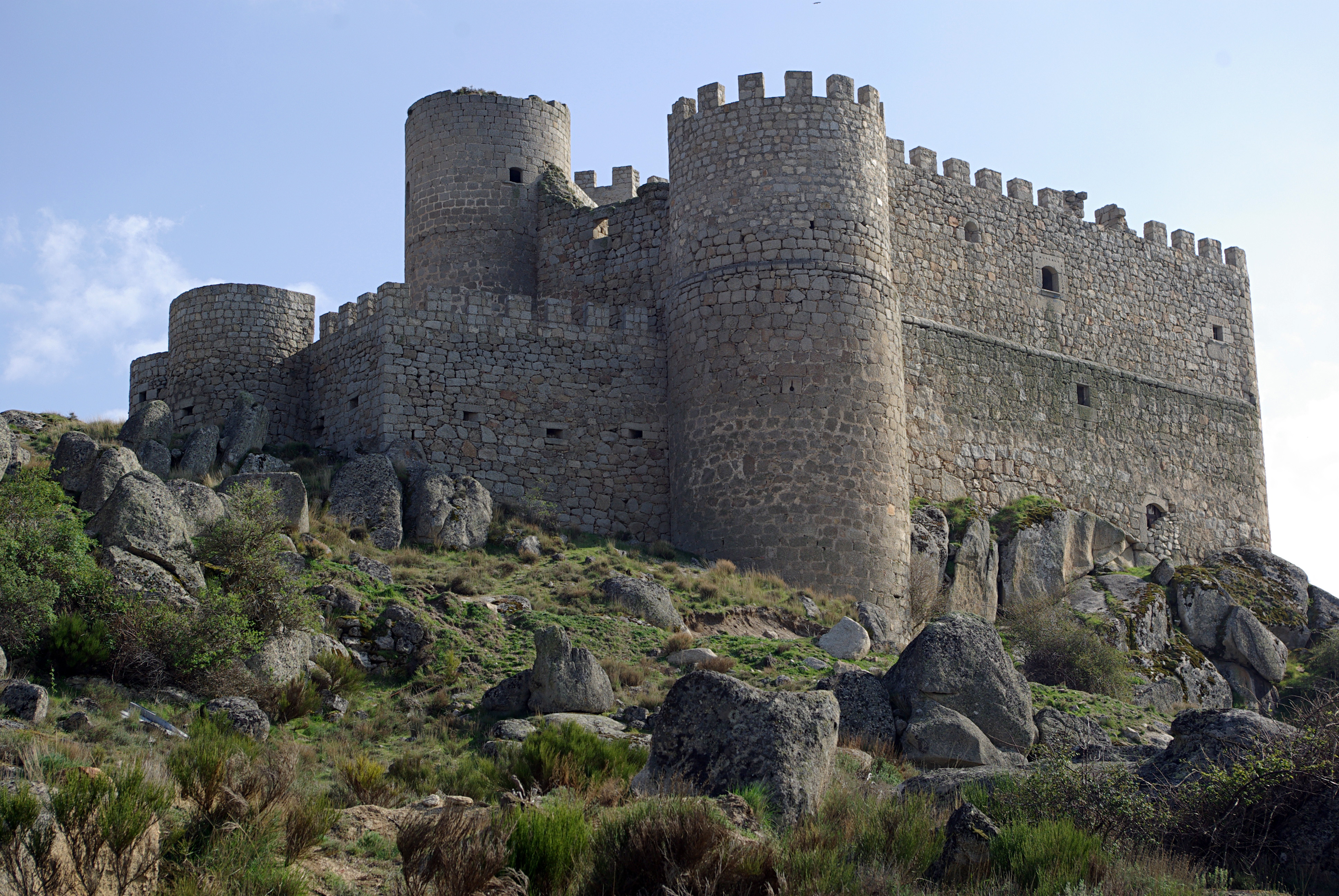
Manqueospese Castle
