= Rasueros =

- municipality
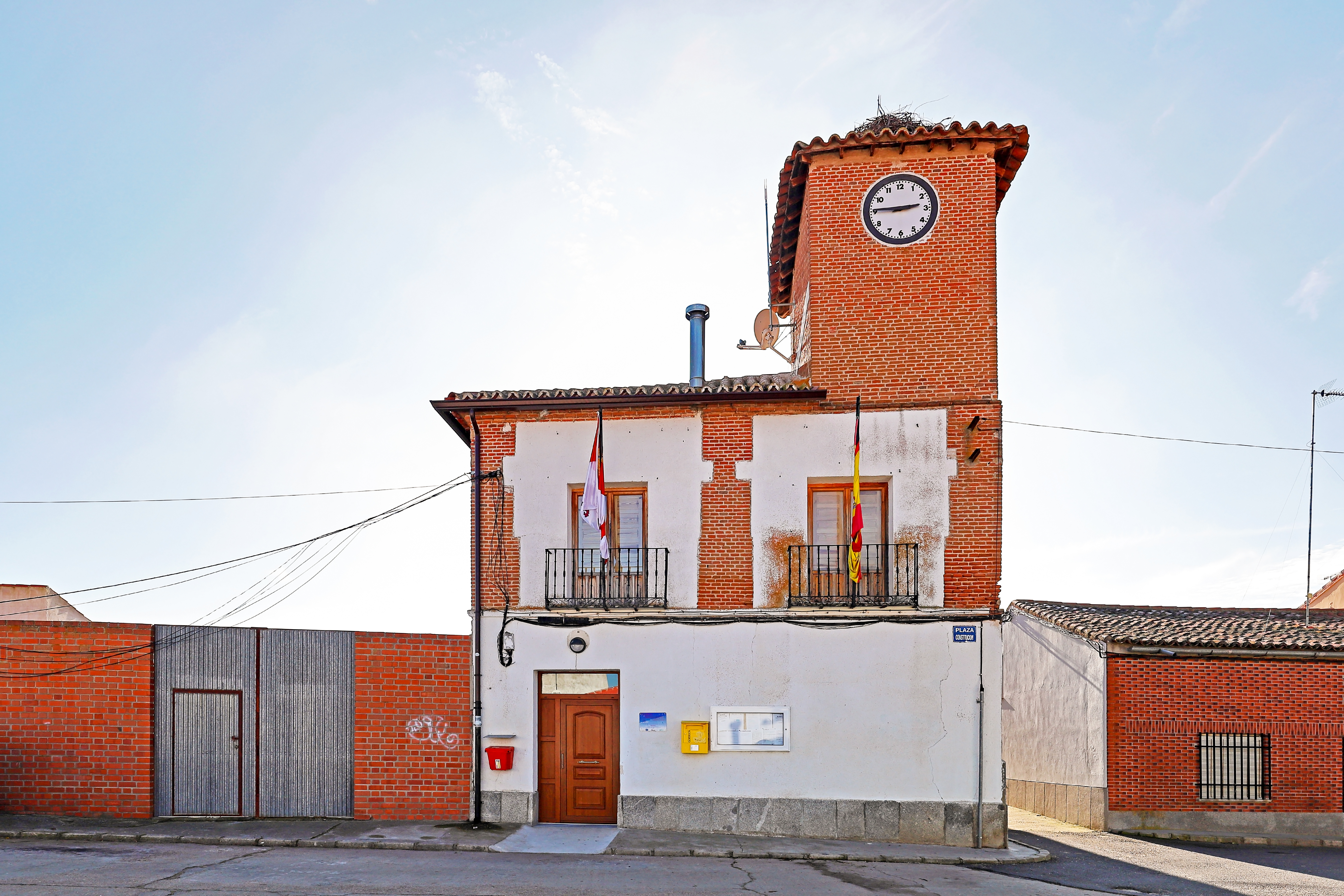
- Town hall

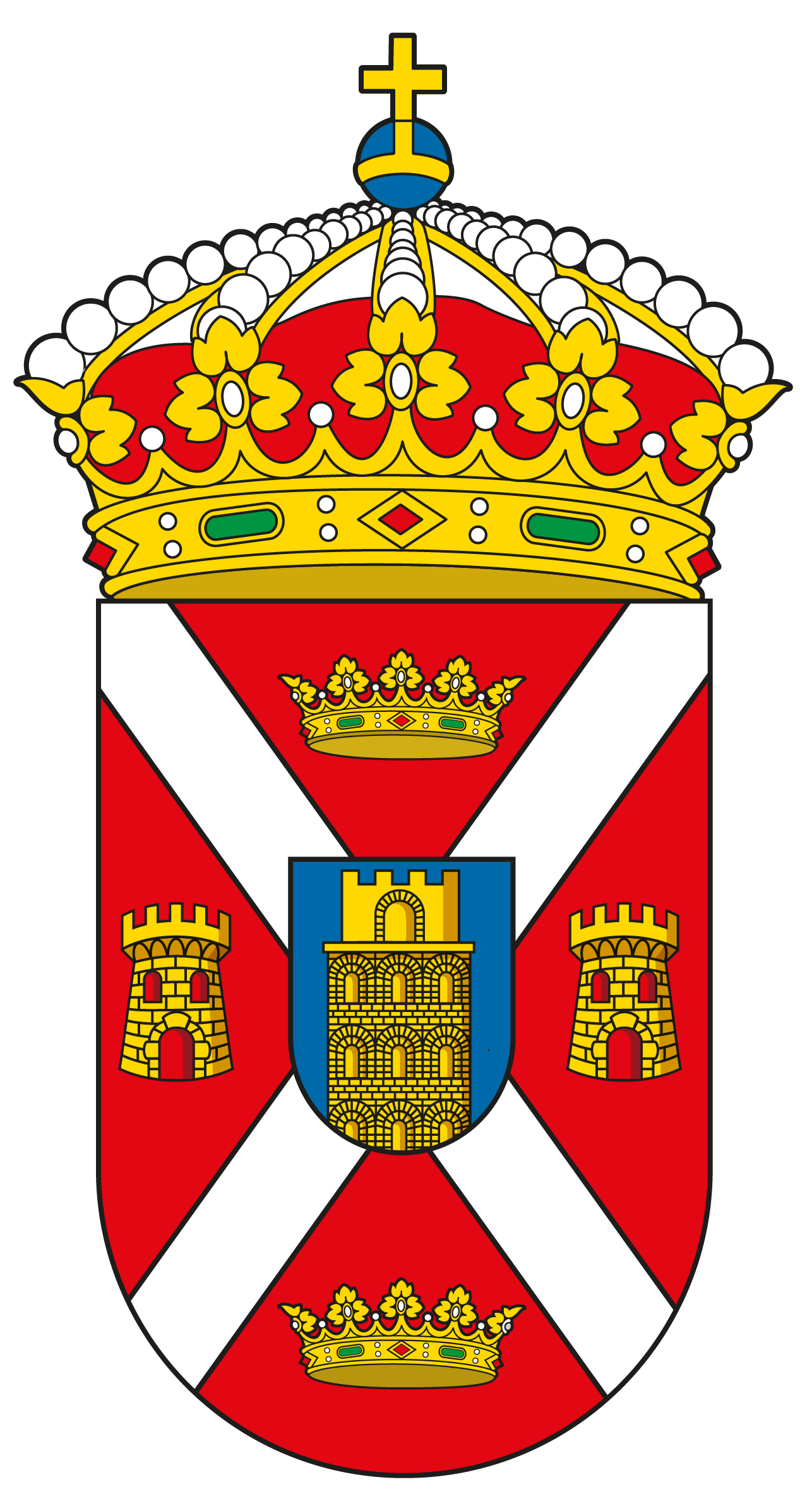
- Coat of arms

- Location in Spain. Rasueros (Spain)
- Coordinates: 41°01′23″N 5°04′28″W
- Country: Spain
- Autonomous community: Castile and León
- Province: Ávila

Area
  - Total: 40 km^{2} (15 sq mi)

Population (2025-01-01)
  - Total: 150
  - Density: 3.8/km^{2} (9.7/sq mi)
- Time zone: UTC+1 (CET)
  - Summer (DST): UTC+2 (CEST)
- Website: Official website

Rasueros is a municipality located in the province of Ávila, Castile and León, Spain.

== Population ==
Historical population
Year	Pop.	±% p.a.
2023	161	—
2024	160	−0.62%
2025	150	−6.25%
Source: INE
