= Gallegos de Sobrinos =

- Municipality
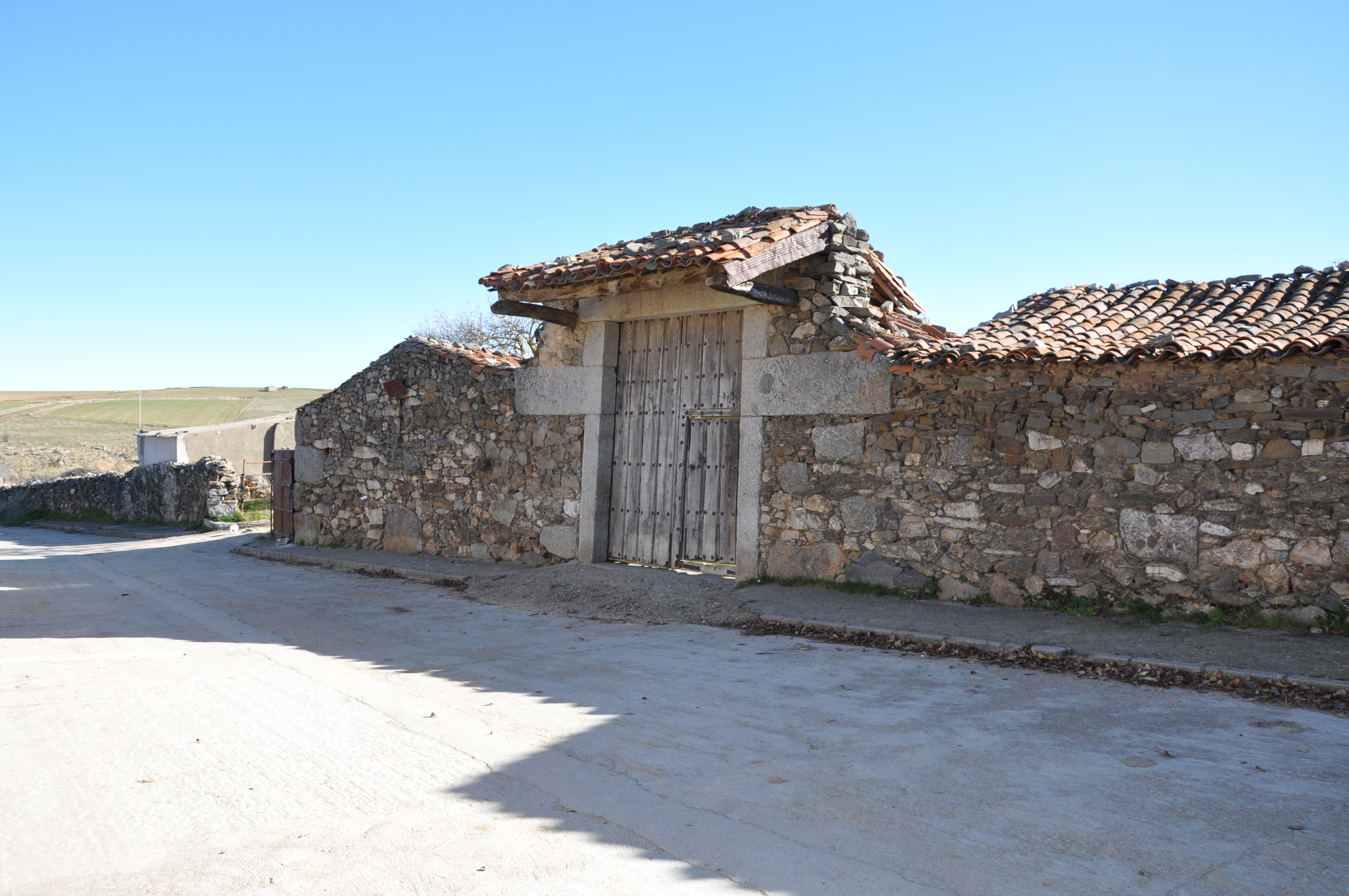
- Traditional door in Gallegos de Sobrinos

- Location in Castile and León Gallegos de Sobrinos (Spain)
- Coordinates: 40°42′59″N 5°06′43″W
- Country: Spain
- Autonomous community: Castile and León
- Province: Ávila

Area
  - Total: 43.27 km^{2} (16.71 sq mi)
- Elevation: 1,173 m (3,848 ft)

Population (2025-01-01)
  - Total: 42
  - Density: 0.97/km^{2} (2.5/sq mi)
- Time zone: UTC+1 (CET)
  - Summer (DST): UTC+2 (CEST)
- Website: Official website

Gallegos de Sobrinos is a village and municipality located in the Province of Ávila in the autonomous community of Castile and León in Spain. It has 42 inhabitants.

== Demographics ==
Historical population

Year	Pop.	±%
1842	106	—
1857	264	+149.1%
1877	288	+9.1%
1887	324	+12.5%
1900	435	+34.3%
1910	481	+10.6%
1920	564	+17.3%
1930	610	+8.2%
1940	599	−1.8%

Year	Pop.	±%
1950	596	−0.5%
1960	519	−12.9%
1970	322	−38.0%
1981	170	−47.2%
1991	131	−22.9%
2001	99	−24.4%
2011	74	−25.3%
2021	36	−51.4%

Source: INE
