= Monsalupe =

- Municipality
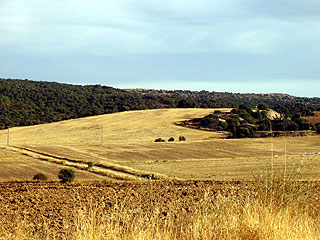
- Landscape of Monsalupe.

- Coat of arms

- Location in Spain. Monsalupe (Spain)
- Coordinates: 40°46′07″N 4°46′52″W
- Country: Spain
- Autonomous community: Castile and León
- Province: Ávila

Area
  - Total: 17 km^{2} (6.6 sq mi)

Population (2025-01-01)
  - Total: 64
  - Density: 3.8/km^{2} (9.8/sq mi)
- Time zone: UTC+1 (CET)
  - Summer (DST): UTC+2 (CEST)
- Website: Official website

Monsalupe is a municipality located in the province of Ávila, Castile and León, Spain.

== Population ==
Historical population
Year	Pop.	±% p.a.
2023	59	—
2024	59	+0.00%
2025	64	+8.47%
Source: INE
