= Donjimeno =

- municipality
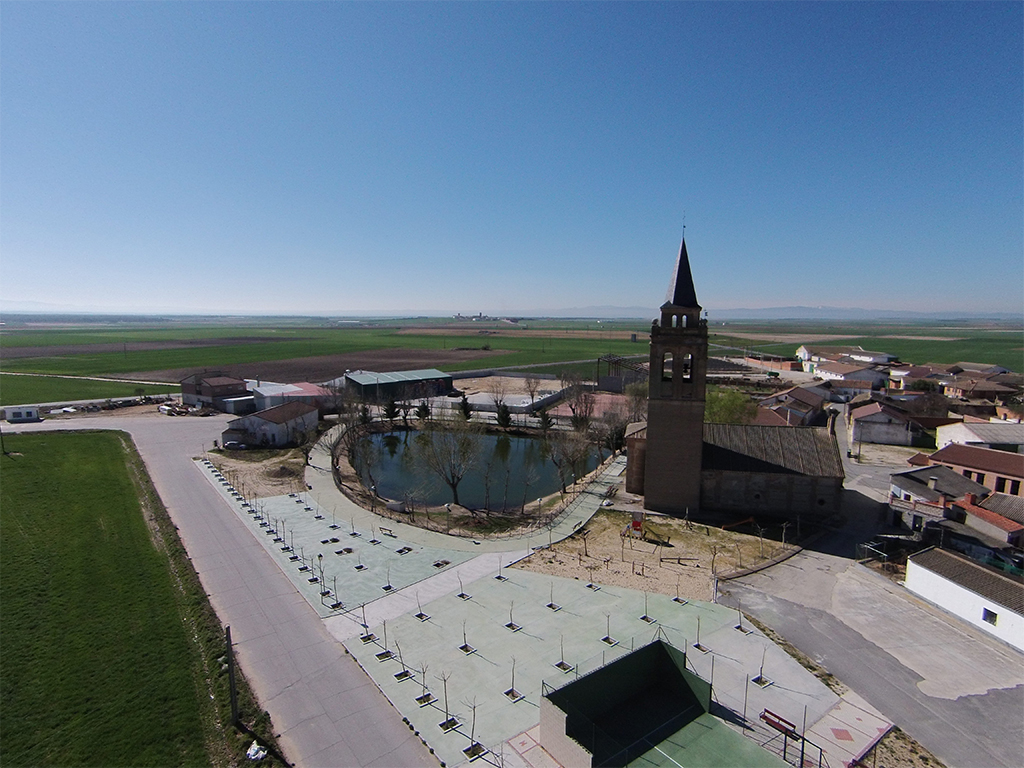
- Airview

- Flag Coat of arms

- Location in Spain. Donjimeno (Spain)
- Coordinates: 40°57′35″N 4°50′43″W
- Country: Spain
- Autonomous community: Castile and León
- Province: Ávila

Area
  - Total: 14.75 km^{2} (5.70 sq mi)
- Elevation: 883 m (2,897 ft)

Population (2025-01-01)
  - Total: 69
  - Density: 4.7/km^{2} (12/sq mi)
- Time zone: UTC+1 (CET)
  - Summer (DST): UTC+2 (CEST)
- Website: Official website

Donjimeno (Spanish pronunciation: [doŋxiˈmeno]) is a municipality located in the province of Ávila, Castile and León, Spain.

== Population ==
Historical population
Year	Pop.	±% p.a.
2023	76	—
2024	72	−5.26%
2025	69	−4.17%
Source: INE
