= Horcajo de las Torres =

- municipality
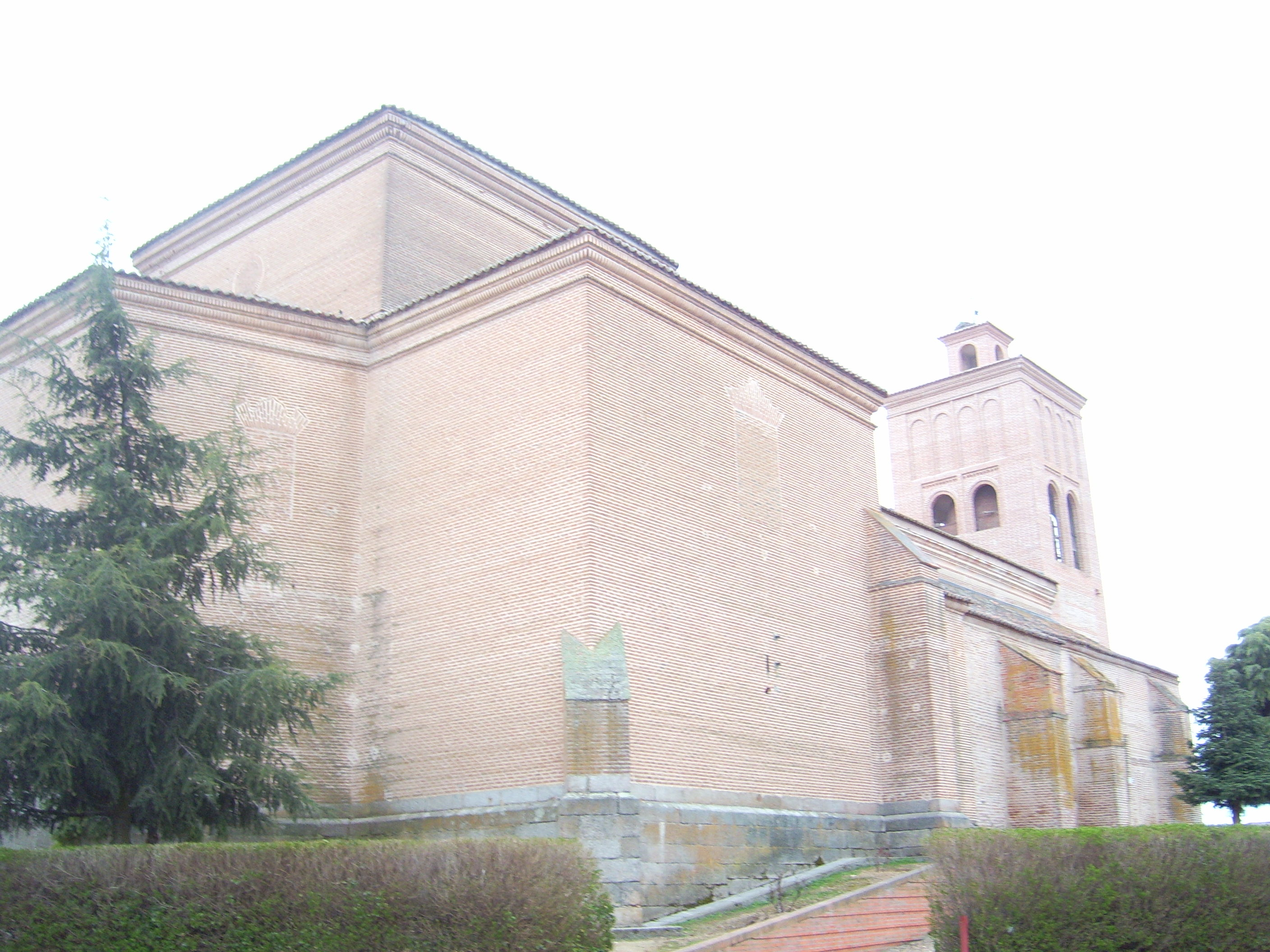
- The Church of Horcajo de las Torres

- Flag Coat of arms

- Location in Spain. Horcajo de las Torres (Castile and León)
- Coordinates: 41°03′54″N 5°05′27″W
- Country: Spain
- Autonomous community: Castile and León
- Province: Ávila

Area
  - Total: 47 km^{2} (18 sq mi)

Population (2025-01-01)
  - Total: 425
  - Density: 9.0/km^{2} (23/sq mi)
- Time zone: UTC+1 (CET)
  - Summer (DST): UTC+2 (CEST)
- Website: Official website

Horcajo de las Torres is a municipality located in the province of Ávila, Castile and León, Spain. According to the 2004 census (INE), the municipality has a population of 720 inhabitants.
