= Sierra de Gredos Regional Park =

Protected area in Spain

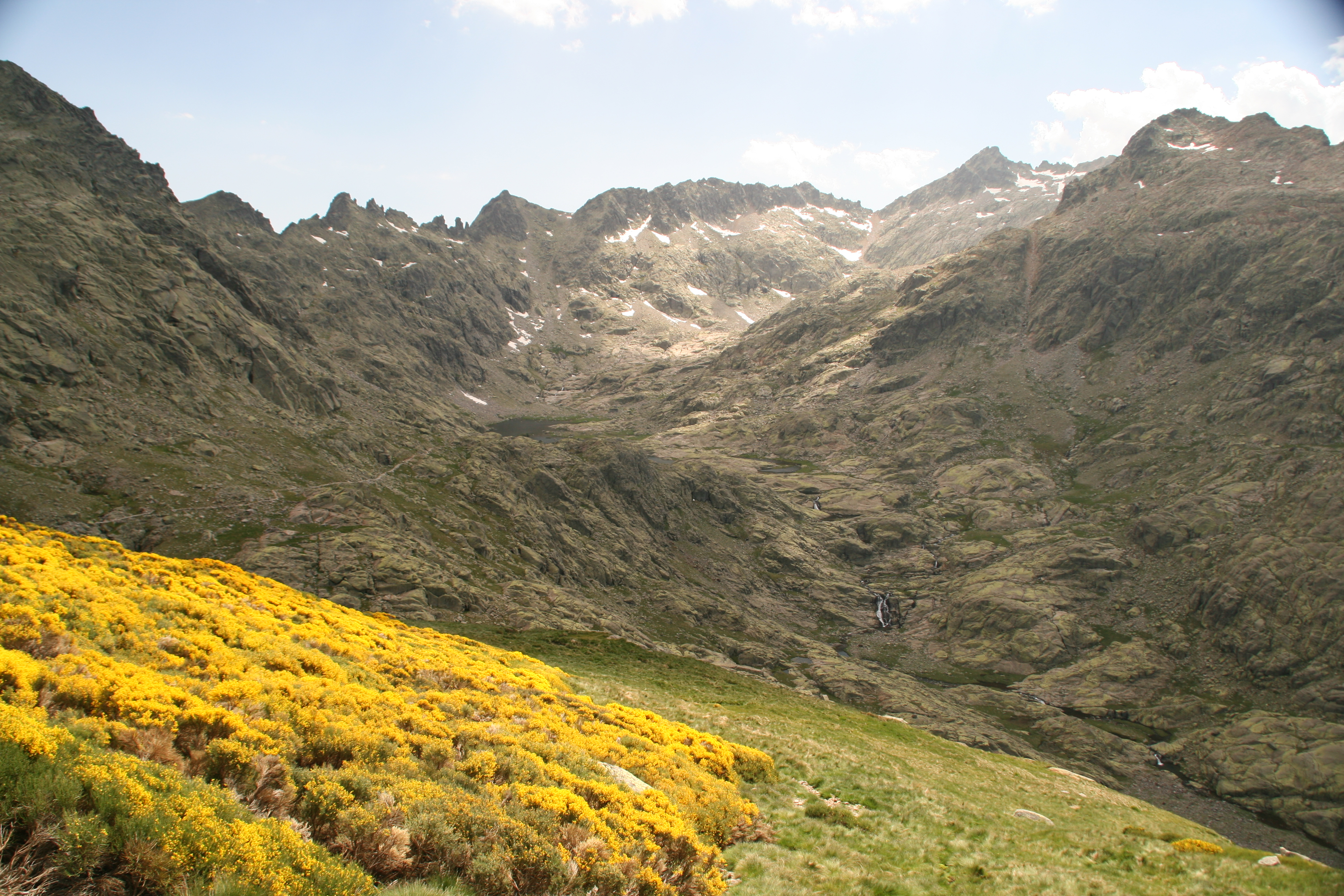
- View of the Gredos cirque

- Location within Spain
- Location: Spain; Sierra de Gredos; Province of Ávila; Castile and León
- Coordinates: 40°15′N 5°16′W
- Area: 863.97 km^{2} (333.58 sq mi)
- Established: June 20, 1996
- Governing body: Junta de Castilla y León (Government of Castile and León)

Sierra de Gredos Regional Park (in Spanish "Parque Regional de la Sierra de Gredos") is a protected natural area in Spain, covering 86,397 hectares. The estimated population within the socio-economic influence area is 21,182. The law that declared the status of the park was published in the BOE on July 22, 1996.

== Location ==

The park, located in the southern end of the province of Ávila, in the autonomous community of Castile and León, contains a great part of the Sierra de Gredos mountain range. Sierra de Gredos is the highest sub-range of the Sistema Central main range. The highest mountain, Almanzor Peak, which is 2,592 metres (8,504 ft) high, is one of the summits towering around the Gredos glacial cirque ("Circo de Gredos").

The area of the park includes territory that belongs to the next municipalities: El Arenal, Ávila, Arenas de San Pedro, Bohoyo, Candeleda, La Carrera, Cuevas del Valle, Gil García, Guisando, El Hornillo, Hoyos del Collado, Hoyos del Espino, Los Llanos de Tormes, Navarredonda de Gredos, Navatejares, Puerto Castilla, Santiago del Tormes, San Esteban del Valle, San Juan de Gredos, San Martín del Pimpollar, Solana de Ávila, Tormellas, Umbrías, Villarejo del Valle and Zapardiel de la Ribera.

The most populous municipalities in the list above are Arenas de San Pedro and Candeleda, both located in the southern slopes of the mountain range.

== Ecology ==
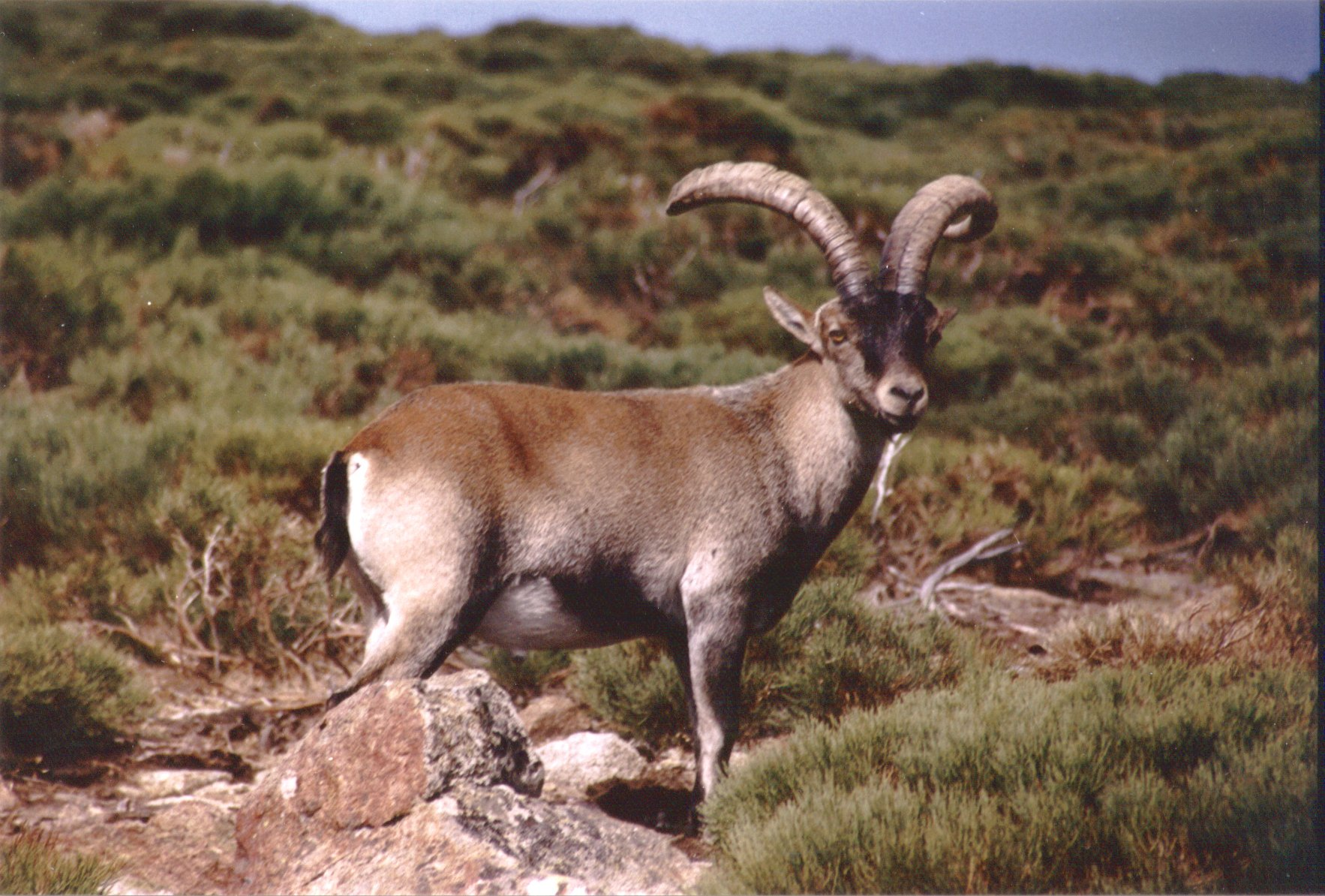
Spanish ibex

The forested areas include extensions occupied by Quercus pyrenaica, pines such as the maritime pine and the Scots pine, and evergreen oaks such as Quercus ilex and Quercus suber. The regional park includes some local endemismic fauna like the subespecies Capra pyrenaica victoriae, Microtus nivalis abulensis, Bufo bufo gredosicola and Salamandra salamandra almanzoris. There are also several mammals such as the European otter and the Iberian shrew, birds such as the Spanish imperial eagle, the cinereous vulture and the black stork, and reptiles such as the European pond turtle and the Vipera latastei.

== See also ==
- Sierra de Gredos
- Province of Ávila
- Circo de Gredos
