= Gredos =

Gredos may refer to:

- Sierra de Gredos, a mountain range in the centre of the Iberian Peninsula
- Circo de Gredos, a glacial cirque situated in the central part of the northern slope of the Sierra de Gredos of the Iberian Peninsula
- Navarredonda de Gredos, a municipality located in the province of Ávila, Castile and León, Spain.
- San Juan de Gredos, a municipality located in the province of Ávila, Castile and León, Spain.
- Western Spanish ibex or Gredos ibex, a vulnerable goat endemic to Spain and Portugal.
- SEAT Gredos, a car model by the Spanish automaker SEAT
