= Miguel Ángel Troitiño =

Spanish geographer (1947–2020)

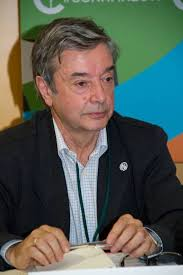
- Born: 1947; El Arenal
- Died: 21 April 2020 (aged 72–73); Madrid
- Alma mater: Complutense University of Madrid
- Occupation: Geographer, university teacher (1973–)
- Employer: Complutense University of Madrid

Miguel Ángel Troitiño Vinuesa (1947 – 2020) was a Spanish geographer, professor of human geography at the Complutense University of Madrid (UCM). He was an expert in cultural tourism and heritage preservation.

== Biography ==
Born in El Arenal, province of Ávila, Spain, in 1947, Troitiño earned a licentiate degree in Geography and History from the UCM. He obtained a PhD in Geography in 1979 from the UCM, reading a dissertation on the city of Cuenca, titled Cuenca, la crisis de una vieja ciudad castellana and supervised by Manuel de Terán Álvarez. A lecturer at the UCM since 1973, he obtained a Chair of Human Geography in 1991.

During his career, he focused on fields such as tourism, cultural heritage, urban planning and territorial development. A great deal of his scholar production dealt with the city of Cuenca. A member of the Institución Gran Duque de Alba, he also worked on the strategy for territorial sustainable development for the Tiétar Valley, in his native province.

He died from COVID-19 during the COVID-19 pandemic in Spain on 21 April 2020.
