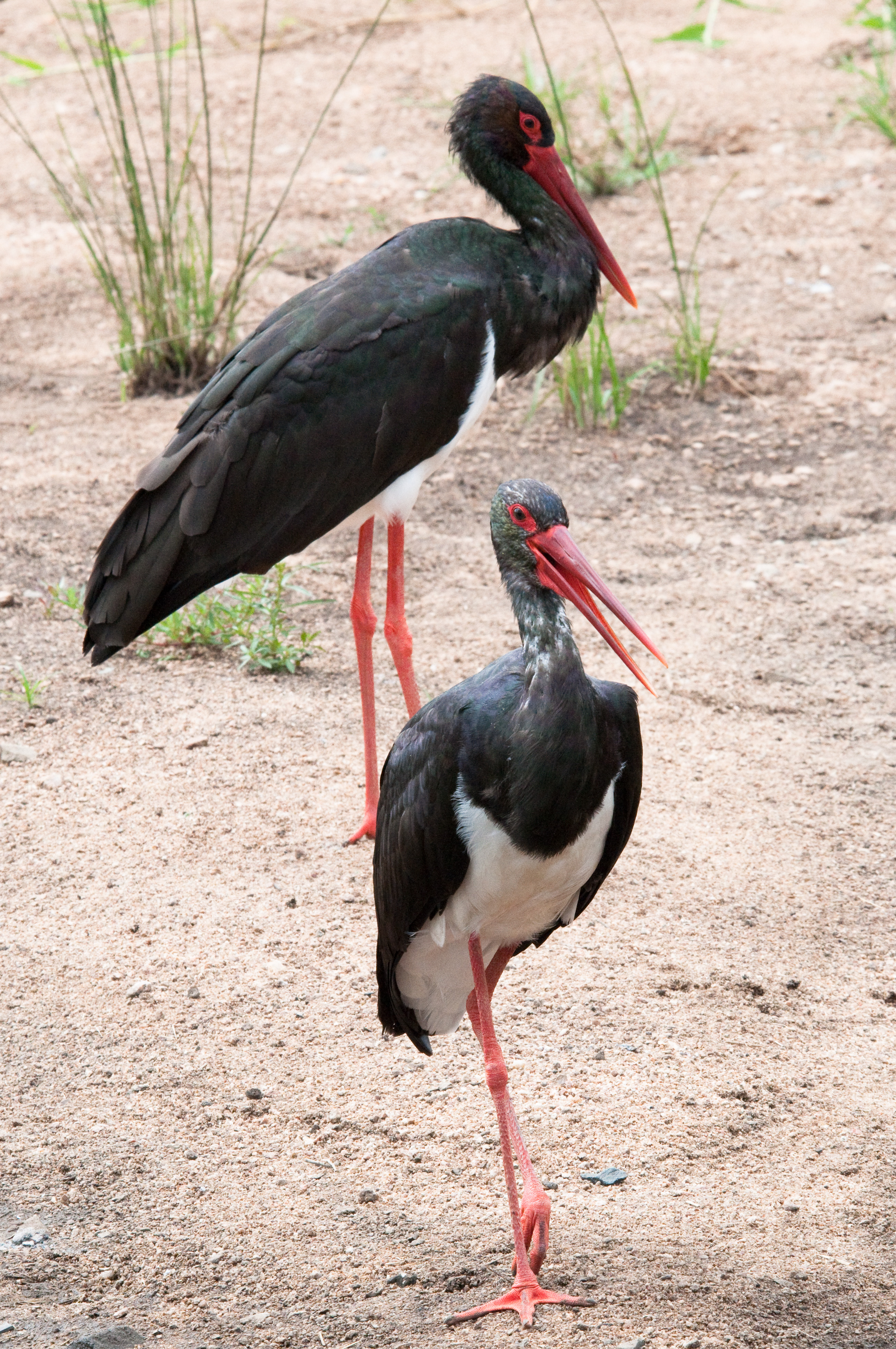
- In Kruger National Park, South Africa

Conservation status
- Least Concern (IUCN 3.1)
- CITES Appendix II

Scientific classification
- Kingdom: Animalia
- Phylum: Chordata
- Class: Aves
- Order: Ciconiiformes
- Family: Ciconiidae
- Genus: Ciconia
- Species: C. nigra

Binomial name
- Ciconia nigra (Linnaeus, 1758)
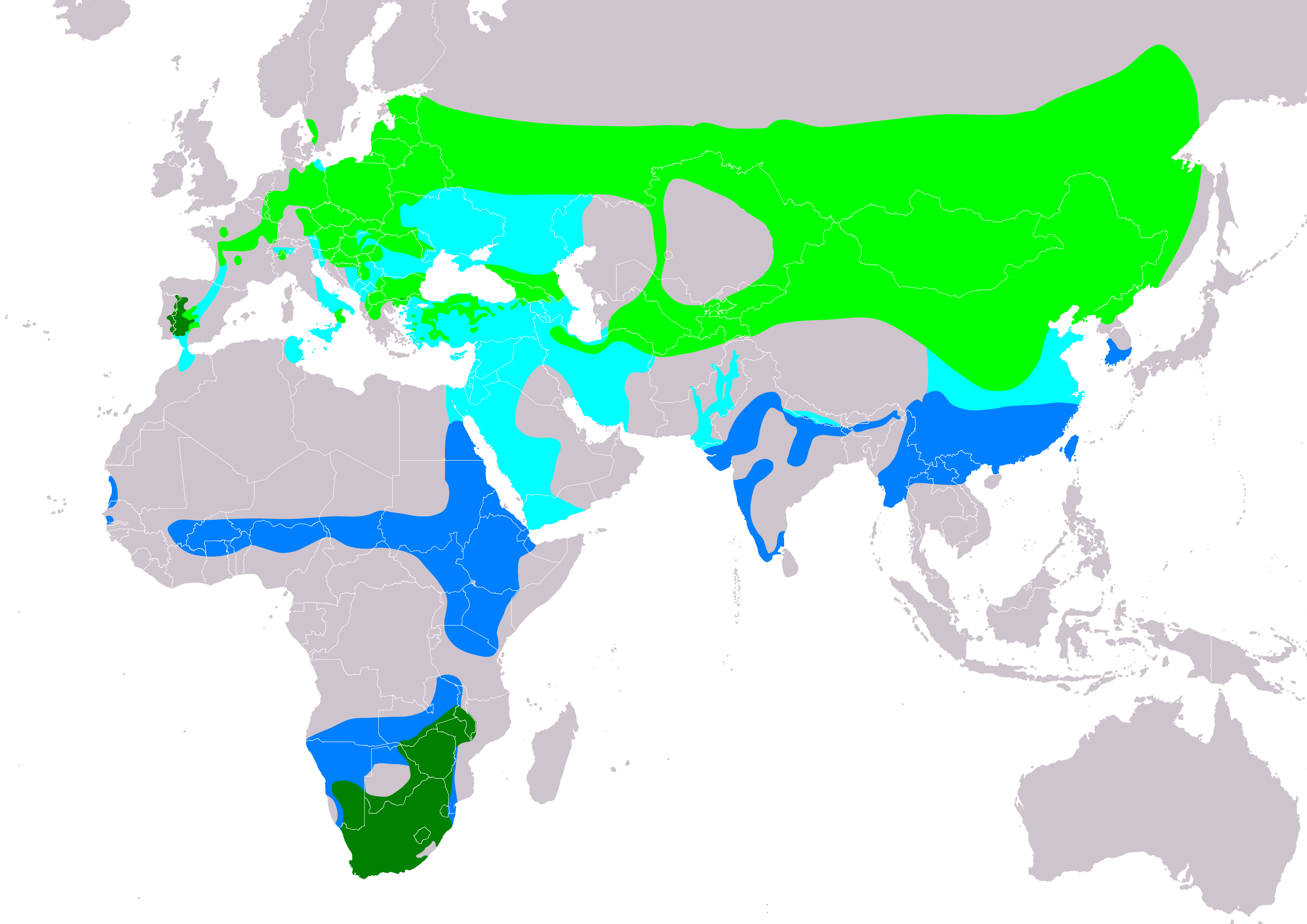
- Range of C. nigra Breeding Resident Passage Non-breeding

Synonyms
- Ardea nigra Linnaeus, 1758

= Black stork =

Species of bird

The black stork (Ciconia nigra) is a large bird in the stork family Ciconiidae. It was first described by Carl Linnaeus in the 10th edition of his Systema Naturae. Measuring on average 95 to 100 cm (37 to 39 in) from beak tip to end of tail with a 145-to-155 cm (57-to-61 in) wingspan, the adult black stork has mainly black plumage, with white underparts, long red legs and a long pointed red beak. A widespread but uncommon species, it breeds in scattered locations across Europe (predominantly in Portugal and Spain, and central and eastern parts), and east across the Palearctic to the Pacific Ocean. It is a long-distance migrant, with European populations wintering in tropical Sub-Saharan Africa, and Asian populations in the Indian subcontinent. When migrating between Europe and Africa, it avoids crossing broad expanses of the Mediterranean Sea and detours via the Levant in the east, the Strait of Sicily in the center, or the Strait of Gibraltar in the west. An isolated non-migratory population lives in Southern Africa.

Unlike the closely related white stork, the black stork is a shy and wary species. It is seen singly or in pairs, usually in marshy areas, rivers or inland waters. It feeds on amphibians, small fish and insects, generally wading slowly in shallow water stalking its prey. Breeding pairs usually build nests in large forest trees—most commonly deciduous but also coniferous—which can be seen from long distances, as well as on large boulders, or under overhanging ledges in mountainous areas. The female lays two to five greyish-white eggs, which become soiled over time in the nest. Incubation takes 32 to 38 days, with both sexes sharing duties, and fledging takes 60 to 71 days.

The black stork is considered to be a species of least concern by the International Union for Conservation of Nature, but its actual status is uncertain. Despite its large range, it is nowhere abundant, and it appears to be declining in parts of its range, such as in India, China and parts of Western Europe, though increasing in others such as the Iberian Peninsula. Various conservation measures have been taken for the black stork, like the Conservation Action Plan for African black storks by Wetlands International. It is also protected under the African-Eurasian Waterbird Agreement and the Convention on International Trade in Endangered Species of Wild Fauna and Flora. On 31 May 1968, South Korea designated the species as natural monument 200.

== Taxonomy and etymology ==
English naturalist Francis Willughby wrote about the black stork in the 17th century, having seen one in Frankfurt. He named it Ciconia nigra, (Note: The universally accepted starting point of modern taxonomy for animals is set at 1758, with the publishing of Linnaeus' 10th edition of Systema Naturae, although scientists had been coining names in the previous century.) from the Latin words for "stork" and "black" respectively. It was one of the many species originally described by Swedish zoologist Carl Linnaeus in the landmark 1758 10th edition of his Systema Naturae, where it was given the binomial name of Ardea nigra. It was moved to the new genus Ciconia by French zoologist Mathurin Jacques Brisson two years later. The word stork is derived from the Old English word storc, thought to be related to the Old High German storah, meaning "stork", and the Old English stearc, meaning "stiff".

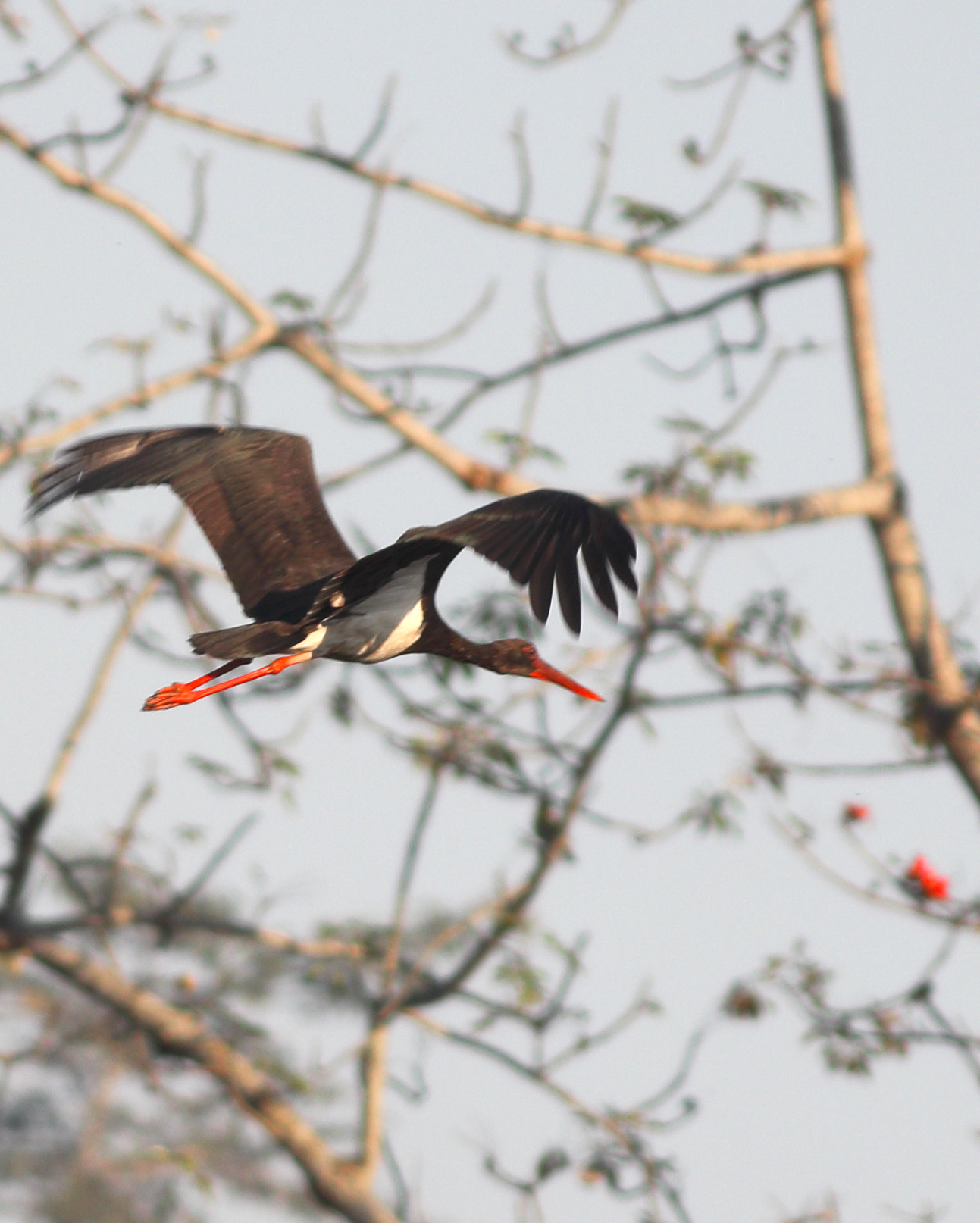
From Manas Tiger Reserve, Assam, India.

The black stork is a member of the genus Ciconia, or typical storks, a group of seven extant species, characterised by straight bills and mainly black and white plumage. The black stork was long thought to be most closely related to the white stork (C. ciconia). However, genetic analysis via DNA–DNA hybridization and mitochondrial cytochrome b DNA by Beth Slikas in 1997 found that it was basal (an early offshoot) in the genus Ciconia. Fossil remains have been recovered from Miocene beds on Rusinga and Maboko Islands in Kenya, which are indistinguishable from the white and black storks.

== Description ==
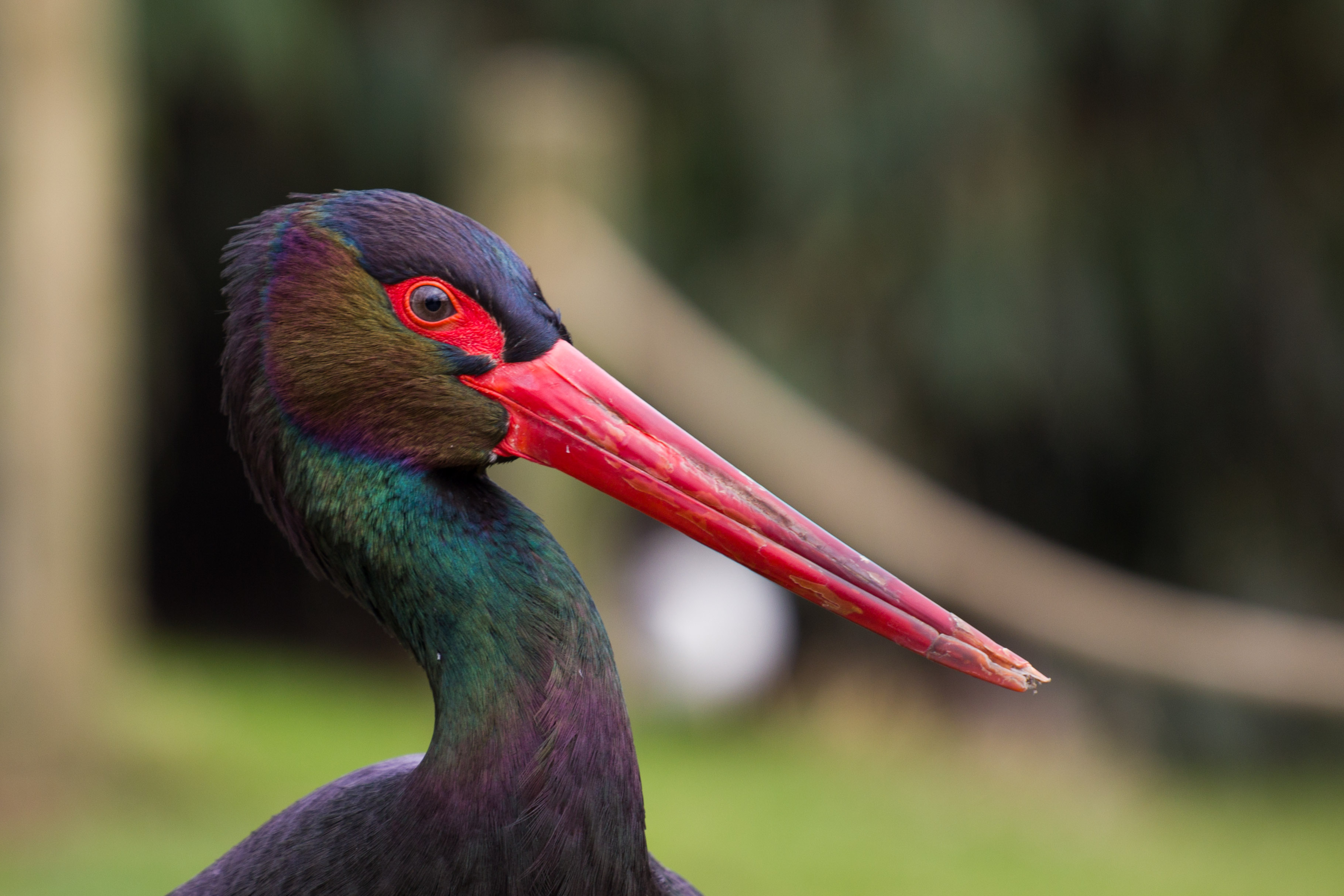
Adult in a Dutch zoo

The black stork is a large bird, measuring between 95 and 100 cm (37 and 39 in) in length with a 145-to-155 cm (57-to-61 in) wingspan, and weighing around 3 kg (6.6 lb). Standing as tall as 102 cm (40 in), it has long red legs, a long neck and a long, straight, pointed red beak. It bears some resemblance to Abdim's stork (C. abdimii), which can be distinguished by its much smaller build, predominantly green bill, legs and feet, and white rump and lower back. The plumage is black with a purplish green sheen, except for the white lower breast, belly, armpits, axillaries and undertail coverts. The breast feathers are long and shaggy, forming a ruff which is used in some courtship displays. The black stork has brown irises, and bare red skin around its eyes. The sexes are identical in appearance, except that males are larger than females on average. Moulting takes place in spring, with the iridescent sheen brighter in new plumage. It walks slowly and steadily on the ground and like all storks, it flies with its neck outstretched.

The juvenile resembles the adult in plumage, but the areas corresponding to the adult black feathers are browner and less glossy. The scapulars, wing and upper tail coverts have pale tips. The legs, bill and bare skin around the eyes are greyish green. It could possibly be confused with the juvenile yellow-billed stork, but the latter has paler wings and mantle, a longer bill and white under the wings.

== Distribution and habitat ==
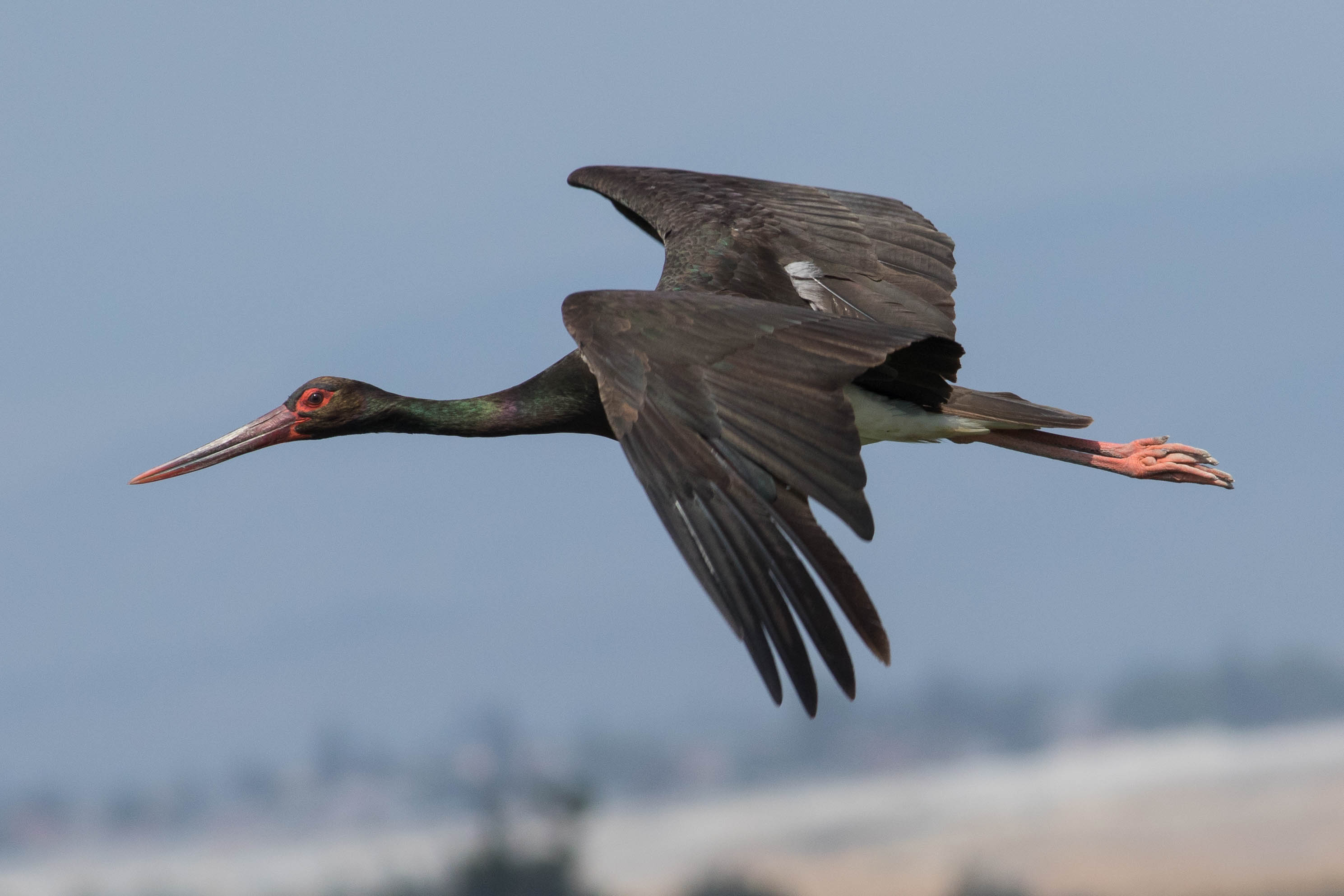
Black stork in flight

During the summer, the black stork is found from Eastern Asia (Siberia and northern China) west to Central Europe, reaching Estonia in the north, Poland, Lower Saxony and Bavaria in Germany, the Czech Republic, Hungary, Italy and Greece in the south, with an outlying population in the central-southwest region of the Iberian Peninsula (Extremadura and surrounding provinces of Spain, plus Portugal). It is migratory, wintering in tropical Africa and Asia, although certain populations of black storks are sedentary or dispersive. An isolated population exists in Southern Africa, where the species is more numerous in the east, in eastern South Africa and Mozambique, and is also found in Zimbabwe, Eswatini, Botswana and less commonly Namibia.

Most of the black storks that summer in Europe migrate to Africa, with those from western Germany and points west heading south via the Iberian Peninsula and the rest via Turkey and the Levant. Those flying via Spain spend winter in the Falémé River basin of eastern Senegal, Guinea, southern Mauritania, Ivory Coast, Sierra Leone and western and central Mali, while those flying via the Sinai end up in northern Ethiopia, the Kotto River basin in the Central African Republic, the Mbokou river basin in Chad and northeastern Nigeria. Black storks summering in West Asia migrate to northern and northeastern India, ranging mainly from Punjab south to Karnataka, and Africa. They are occasional visitors to Sri Lanka. Those summering further east in eastern Russia and China winter mainly in southern China, and occasionally in Hong Kong, Myanmar, northern Thailand, and Laos. They were first recorded in western Myanmar in 1998.

The black stork prefers more wooded areas than the better-known white stork, and breeds in large marshy wetlands with interspersed coniferous or broadleaved woodlands, but also inhabits hills and mountains with sufficient networks of creeks. It usually inhabits ponds, rivers, edges of lakes, estuaries and other freshwater wetlands. The black stork does inhabit more agricultural areas in the Caspian lowlands, but even here it avoids close contact with people. Its wintering habitat in India comprises reservoirs or rivers with nearby scrub or forest, which provide trees that black storks can roost in at night. In southern Africa it is found in shallow water in rivers or lakes, or swamps, but is occasionally encountered on dry land.

After disappearing from Belgium before the onset of the 20th century, it has returned to breed in the Belgian Ardennes, Luxembourg and Burgundy, France, by 2000. It appears to be increasing in numbers in Spain and Portugal, where the population was estimated at 405 to 483 pairs in 2006. The black stork is a rare vagrant to the British Isles, turning up in the warmer months—particularly in spring—generally in the south and east. Sightings have become more common since the 1970s as its breeding range moves northwards. It has been recorded in Scotland six times between 1946 and 1983, including from Shetland, Orkney and the Highlands, as well as the Scottish Borders (Peebles). It is not abundant in the western parts of its distribution, but more densely inhabits eastern Transcaucasia. Further east, it has been recorded from locations across Iran, though little is known about its habits there; breeding has been recorded from near Aliabad in Fars province, Khabr National Park in Kerman province, Karun river in Khuzestan province, Qaranqu River in East Azarbaijan province, and Aliabad river in Razavi Khorasan province. The population has declined in Iran due to draining of wetlands. East of the Ural Mountains, the black stork is patchily found in forested and mountainous areas up to 60°‒63° N across Siberia to the Pacific Ocean. South of Siberia, it breeds in Xinjiang, northwestern China, northern Mongolia south to the Altai Mountains, and northeastern China south to the vicinity of Beijing. In the Korean peninsula, the black stork is an uncommon summer visitor, no longer breeding in the south since 1966. Birds have been seen in the northeast but it is not known whether they breed there. Similarly it has been seen in the summer in Afghanistan, but its breeding status is uncertain.

=== Migration ===
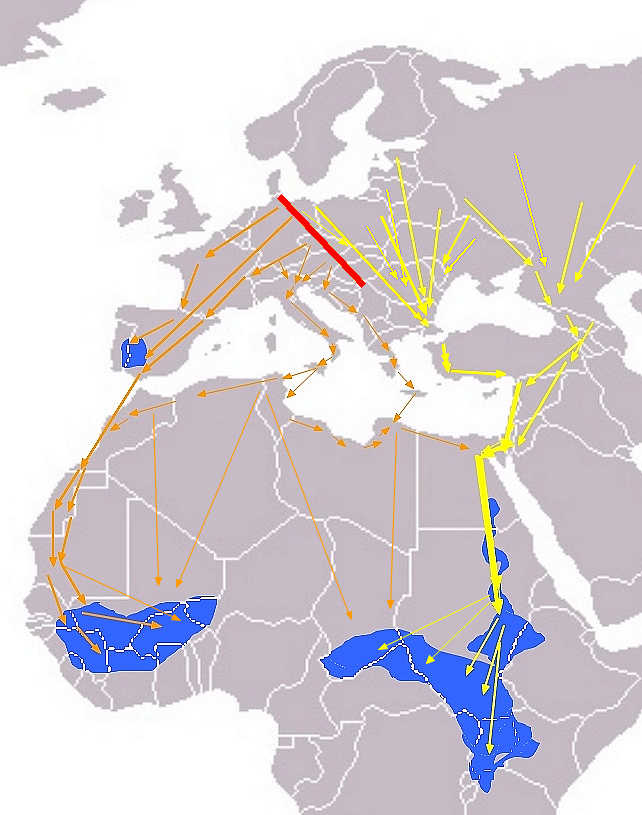
Red line: Migration border Orange arrow: Western migration Yellow arrow: Eastern migration Blue: Winter location

Migration takes place from early August to October, with a major exodus in September. Some of the Iberian populations, and also those in southern Africa, are essentially non-migratory, though they may wander freely in the non-breeding areas. A broad-winged soaring bird, the black stork is assisted by thermals of hot air for long-distance flight, although is less dependent on them than is the white stork. Since thermals only form over land, the black stork, together with large raptors, must cross the Mediterranean at the narrowest points, and many black storks travel south through the Bosphorus and on through the Sinai, as well as through Gibraltar. The trip is around 5,667 km (3,521 mi) via the western route and 7,000 km (4,300 mi) via the eastern route, with satellite tracking yielding an average travel time of 37 and 80 days respectively. The western route goes over the Rock of Gibraltar or over the Bay of Gibraltar, generally on a southwesterly track that takes them to the central part of the strait, from where they reach Morocco. Many birds then fly around the Sahara next to the coast. About 10% of the western storks choose the passage between Sicily (Italy) and Cap Bon (Tunisia), crossing the 145 km wide Strait of Sicily.

Spain contains several important areas—Monfragüe National Park, Sierra de Gredos Regional Park, National Hunting Reserve in Cíjara, Natural Park of the Sierra Hornachuelos and Doñana National Park—where black storks stop over on the western migration route. Pesticide use has threatened birdlife in nearby Doñana. Further south, Lake Faguibine in Mali is another stopover point but it has been affected by drought in recent years.

== Behaviour ==
A wary species, the black stork avoids contact with people. It is generally found alone or in pairs, or in flocks of up to 100 birds when migrating or during winter.

The black stork has a wider range of calls than the white stork, its main call being a chee leee, which sounds like a loud inhalation. It makes a hissing call as a warning or threat. Displaying males produce a long series of wheezy raptor-like squealing calls rising in volume and then falling. It rarely indulges in mutual bill-clattering when adults meet at the nest. Adults will do so as part of their mating ritual or when angered. The young clatter their bills when aroused.

The up-down display is used for a number of interactions with other members of the species. Here a stork positions its body horizontally and quickly bobs its head up from down-facing to around 30 degrees above horizontal and back again, while displaying the white segments of its plumage prominently, and this is repeated several times. The display is used as a greeting between birds, and—more vigorously—as a threat display. The species' solitary nature means that this threat display is rarely witnessed.

=== Breeding ===
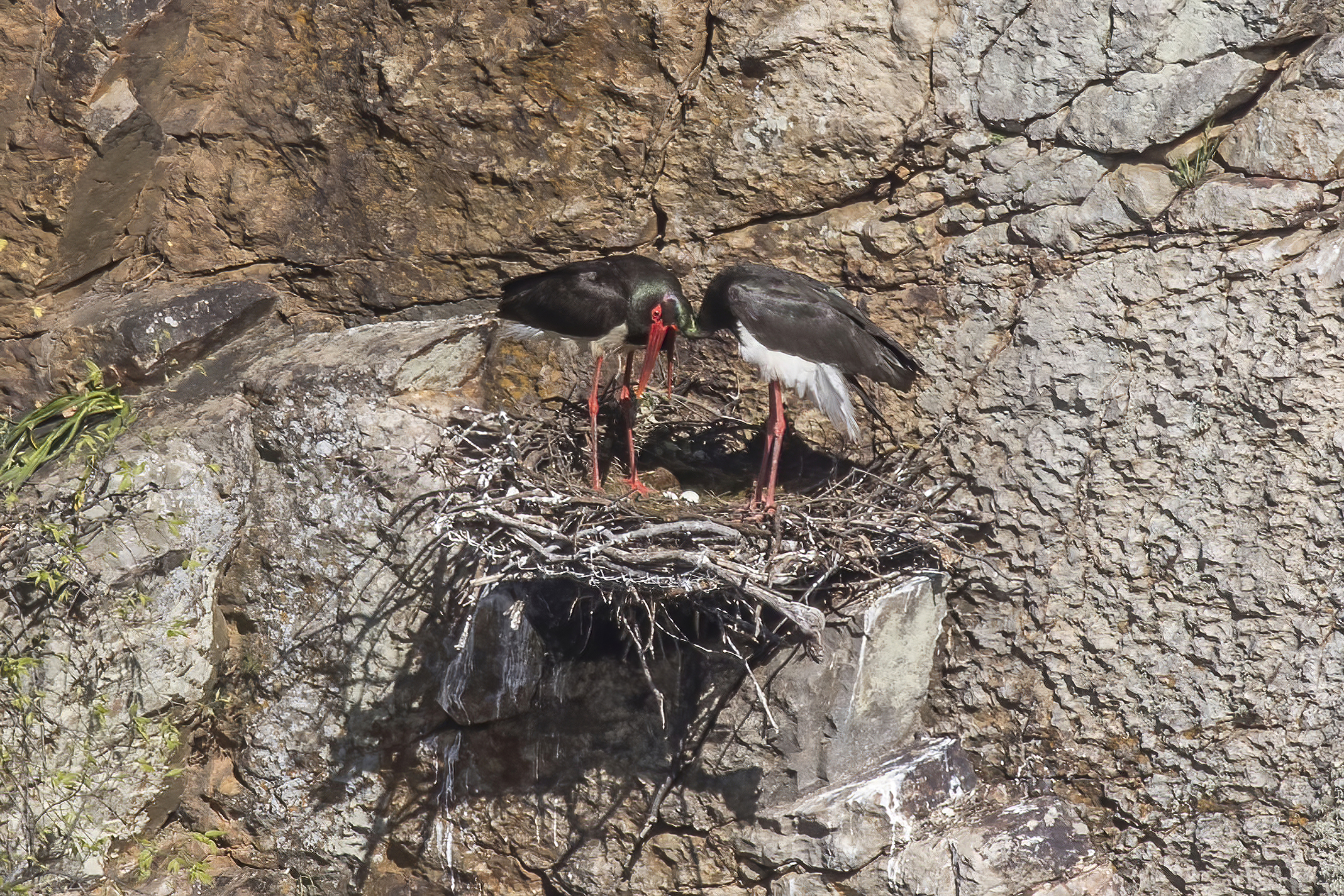
pair with eggs in nest; Salto Del Gitano, Cáceres, Spain

Ringed black stork foraging in a ditch in the Netherlands

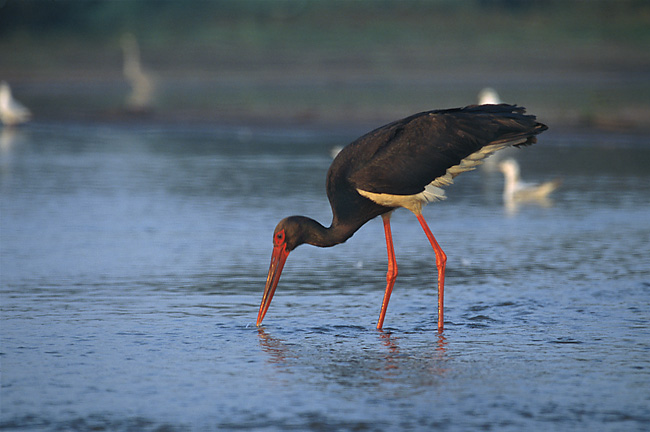
Black stork foraging

The black stork breeds between April and May in the Northern Hemisphere, with eggs usually laid in late April. In southern Africa, breeding takes place in the months between September and March, possibly to take advantage of abundant water prey rendered easier to catch as the rivers dry up and recede—from April and May in Zimbabwe, Botswana and northern South Africa, and as late as July further south.

Pairs in courtship have aerial displays that appear to be unique among the storks. Paired birds soared in parallel, usually over the nest territory early in the mornings or late afternoons with one bird splaying the white undertail coverts to the sides of the narrowed black tail and the pair calls to each other. These courtship flights are difficult to see due to the densely forested habitat in which they breed. The nest is large, constructed from sticks and twigs, and sometimes also large branches, at an elevation of 4–25 m (13–82 ft). The black stork prefers to construct its nest in forest trees with large canopies where the nest can be built far from the main trunk—generally in places far from human disturbance. For the most part, deciduous trees are chosen for nesting sites, though conifers are used as well. A 2003 field study in Estonia found that the black stork preferred oak (Quercus robur), European aspen (Populus tremula), and to a lesser extent Scots pine (Pinus sylvestris), and ignored Norway spruce (Picea abies), in part due to the canopy structure of the trees. Trees with nests averaged around 25.6 ± 5.2 metres (84 ± 17 ft) high and had a diameter at breast height of 66 ± 20 centimetres (26.0 ± 7.9 in). Furthermore, 90% of the trees chosen were at least 80 years old, highlighting the importance of conserving old-growth forests. A 2004 field study of nesting sites in Dadia-Lefkimi-Soufli National Park in north-eastern Greece found that it preferred the Calabrian pine (Pinus brutia), which had large side branches that allowed it to build the nest away from the trunk, as well as black pine (Pinus nigra) and to a lesser extent Turkey oak (Quercus cerris). It chose the largest trees in an area, generally on steeper ground and near streams. Trees chosen were on average over 90 years old. In the Iberian peninsula it nests in pine and cork oak (Quercus suber).

In steeply mountainous areas such as parts of Spain, South Africa and the Carpathian Mountains it nests on cliffs, on large boulders, in caves and under overhanging ledges. The black stork's solitary nests are usually at least 1 km (0.6 mi) apart, even where the species is numerous. Although newly constructed nests may be significantly smaller, older nests can be 1–2 m (3.3–6.6 ft) in diameter. In southern Africa, the black stork may occupy the nests of other bird species such as hamerkop (Scopus umbretta) or Verreaux's eagle (Aquila verreauxi) and commonly reuses them in successive years. They are repaired with earth and grass, and lined with leaves, moss, grass, animal fur, paper, clay and rags.

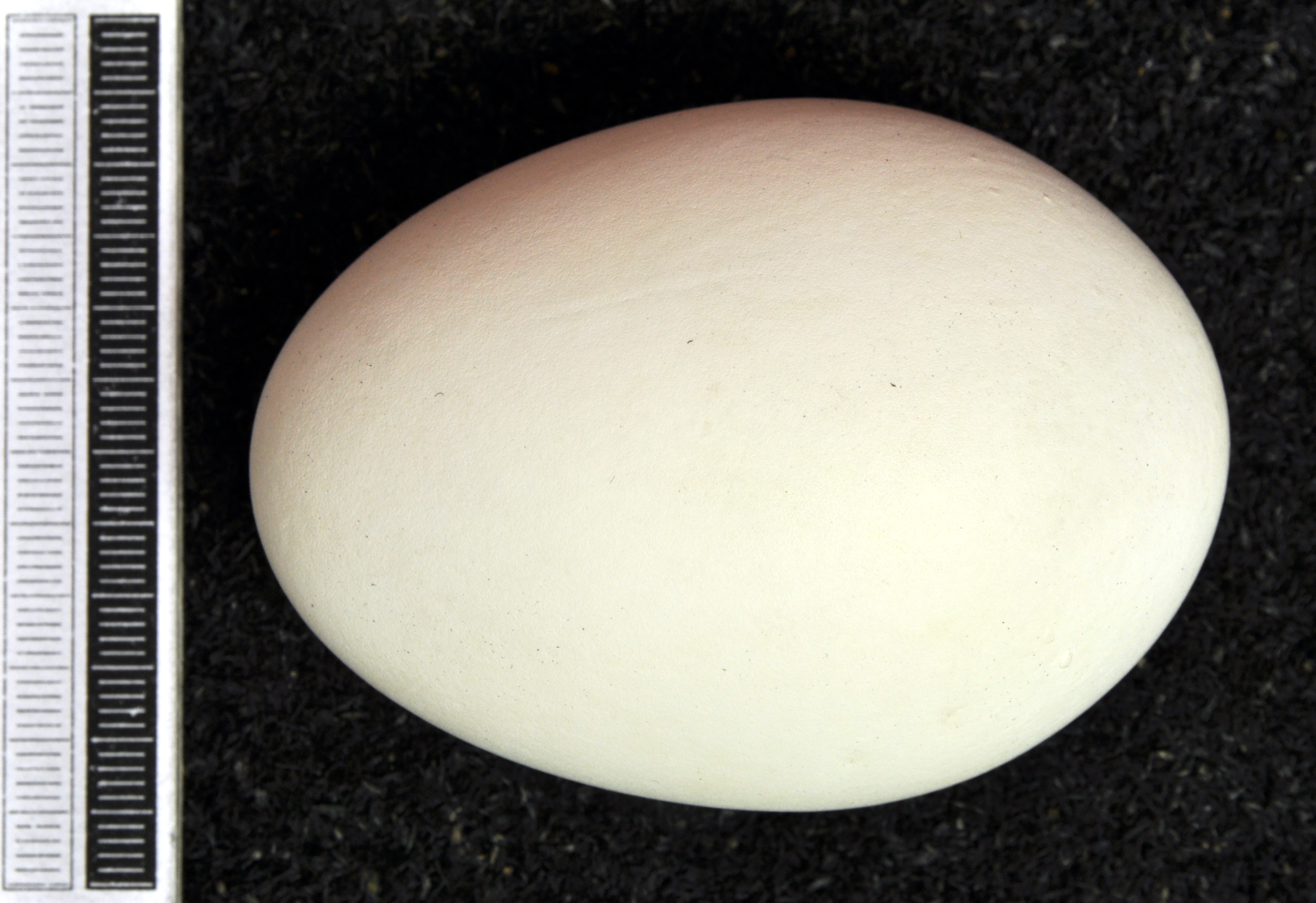
Egg, Collection Museum Wiesbaden

In a clutch, there are two to five, or rarely even six large oval grey-white eggs, which become soiled during incubation. They can be 64–70 mm (2.5–2.8 in) long and 50–53 mm (2.0–2.1 in) wide, averaging about 68 mm (2.7 in) in length and 52 mm (2.0 in) in width. The eggs are laid with an interval of two days. Hatching is asynchronous, and takes place at the end of May. Incubation takes 32 to 38 days, with both sexes sharing duties, which commence after the first or second egg is laid. The young start flying by the end of July. Fledging takes 60 to 71 days, after which the young joins the adults at their feeding grounds. However, for another two weeks, the young continue to return to the nest, to be fed and to roost at night.

At least one adult remains in the nest for two to three weeks after hatching to protect the young. Both parents feed the young by regurgitating onto the floor of the nest. Black stork parents have been known to kill one of their fledglings, generally the weakest, in times of food shortage to reduce brood size and hence increase the chance of survival of the remaining nestlings. Stork nestlings do not attack each other, and their parents' method of feeding them (disgorging large amounts of food at once) means that stronger siblings cannot outcompete weaker ones for food directly, hence parental infanticide is an efficient way of reducing brood size. This behaviour has only rarely been observed in the species, although the shyness of the species and difficulties in studying its nesting habits mean that it might not be an uncommon phenomenon.

Ringing recovery studies in Europe suggests that nearly 20% of chicks reach the breeding stage, around 3 years, and about 10% live beyond 10 years and about 5% beyond 20 years. Captive individuals have lived for as long as 36 years.

=== Feeding ===
The black stork mainly eats fish, including small cyprinids, pikes, roaches, eels, budds, perches, burbots, sticklebacks and muddy loaches (Misgurnus and Cobitis). It may feed on amphibians, small reptiles, crabs, mammals and birds, and invertebrates such as snails, molluscs, earthworms, and insects like water beetles and their larvae.

Foraging for food takes place mostly in fresh water, though the black stork may look for food on dry land at times. The black stork wades patiently and slowly in shallow water, often alone or in a small group if food is plentiful. It has been observed shading the water with its wings while hunting. In India, it often forages in mixed species flocks with the white stork, woolly-necked stork (Ciconia episcopus), demoiselle crane (Grus virgo) and bar-headed goose (Anser indicus). The black stork also follows large mammals such as deer and livestock, presumably to eat the invertebrates and small animals flushed by their presence.

=== Parasites and symbionts ===
More than 12 species of parasitic helminth have been recorded from black storks with Cathaemasia hians and Dicheilonema ciconiae reported to be the most dominant. The juvenile black stork, although having a less diverse helminth population, is parasitized more frequently than the adult. A species of Corynebacterium—C. ciconiae—was isolated and described from the trachea of healthy black storks, and is thought to be part of the natural flora of the species. A herpes virus is known from black storks. Birdlice that have been recorded on the species include Neophilopterus tricolor, Colpocephalum nigrae, and Ardeicola maculatus. A diverse array of predatory mesostigmatid mites—particularly the genera Dendrolaelaps and Macrocheles—have been recovered from black stork nests. Their role is unknown, though they could prey on parasitic arthropods.

== Status and conservation ==
Since 1998, the black stork has been rated as a species of least concern on the IUCN Red List of Endangered Species. This is because it has a large range—more than 20,000 km^{2} (7,700 mi^{2})—and because its population is thought not to have declined by 30% over ten years or three generations and thus is not a rapid enough decline to warrant a vulnerable rating. Even so, the state of the population overall is unclear, and although it is widespread, it is not abundant anywhere. Black stork numbers have declined for many years in western Europe, and the species has been extirpated as a breeding bird from the northwestern edge of its range, including the Netherlands and Scandinavia (for example, small numbers used to breed in Denmark and Sweden, but none verified after the 1950s). The population in India—a major wintering ground—is declining. Previously a regular winter visitor to the Mai Po Marshes, it is now seldom seen there, and appears to be in decline in China overall. Its habitat is changing rapidly in much of eastern Europe and Asia. Various conservation measures have been taken, including Wetlands International's Conservation Action Plan for African black storks, which focuses on improving the wintering conditions of the birds which breed in Europe. It is protected by the Agreement on the Conservation of African-Eurasian Migratory Waterbirds (AEWA) and the Convention on International Trade in Endangered Species of Wild Fauna and Flora (CITES).

Hunters threaten the black stork in some countries of southern Europe and Asia, such as Pakistan, and breeding populations may have been eliminated there. The black stork vanished from the Ticino River valley in northern Italy, with hunting a likely contributor. In 2005, black storks were released into the Parco Lombardo del Ticino in an attempt to re-establish the species there.

Since October 2021, the black stork has been classified as Moderately Depleted by the IUCN Green Status of Species.
