= Pico Almanzor =

Mountain in Spain

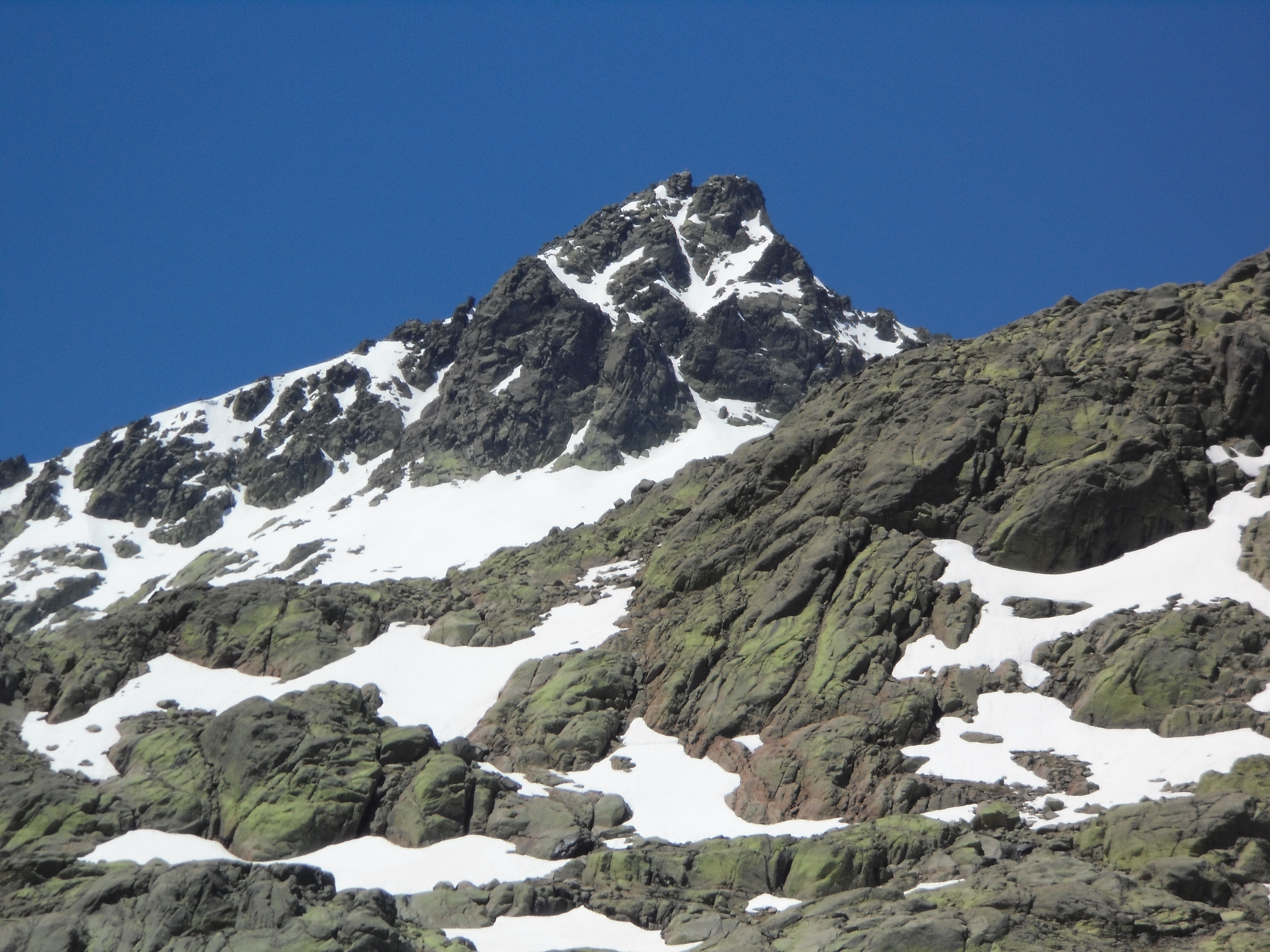

Highest point
- Elevation: 2,591 m (8,501 ft)
- Prominence: 1,689 m (5,541 ft)
- Listing: Ultra, Ribu
- Coordinates: 40°14′48″N 05°17′52″W

Naming
- English translation: Peak of al-Mansur
- Language of name: Spanish

Geography
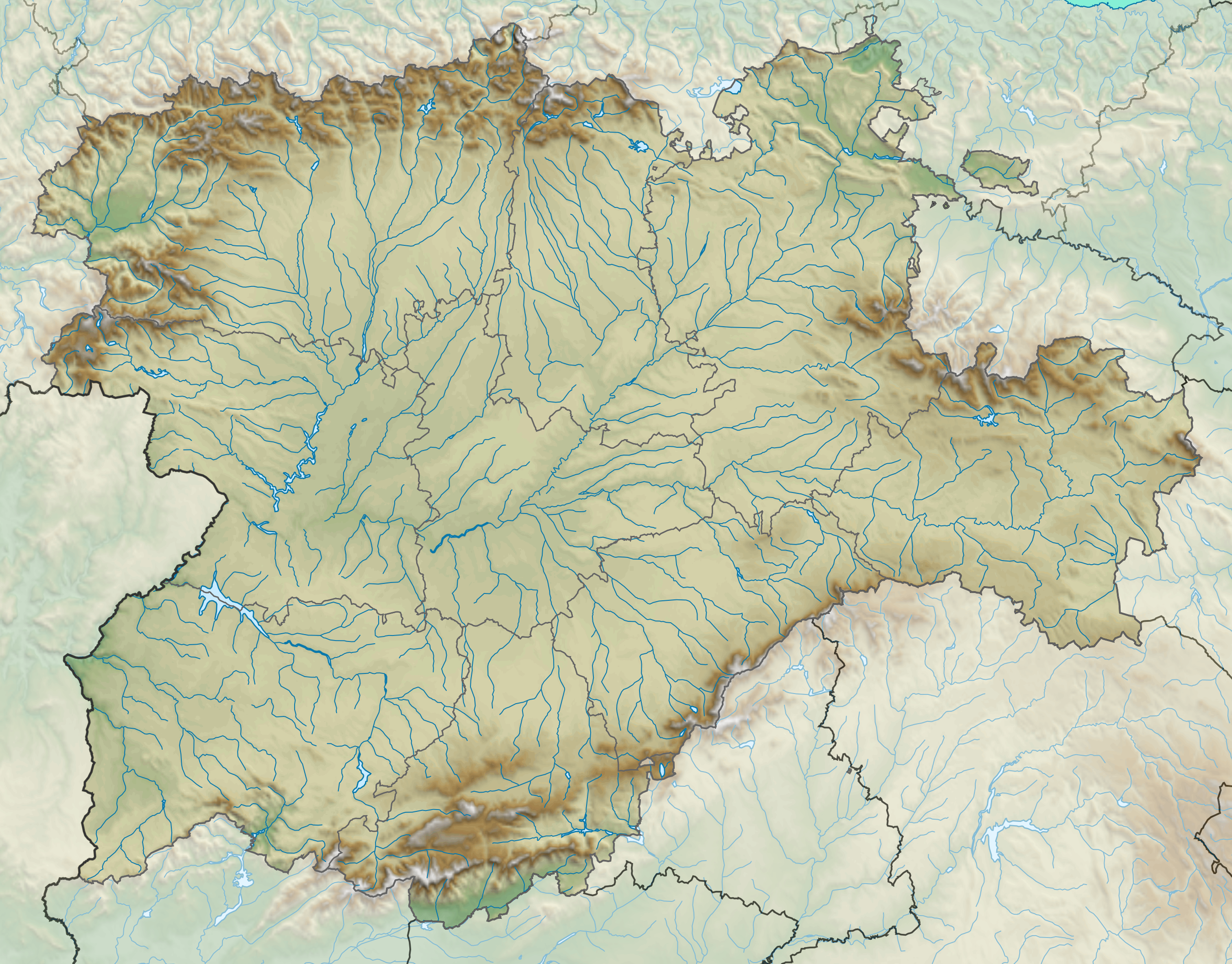
- Location within Castile and León Location within Spain
- Location: Zapardiel de la Ribera and Candeleda, Ávila, Spain
- Parent range: Sierra de Gredos

Geology
- Mountain type: granite

Climbing
- First ascent: M. González de Amezúa & J. Ibrián, 1899

Pico Almanzor is the highest mountain in central Spain. Situated in the Sierra de Gredos in the province of Ávila, Almanzor is 2,591 metres (8,501 ft) high. It is made of granite. The mountain is also known as Pico de Almanzor and Moro Almanzor.

== History ==
The mountain got its name from المنصور : Al-Manṣūr (Arabic for "the victorious"). Al-Mansur Ibn Abi Aamir was a general and statesman in Muslim Spain (Caliphate of Cordoba) during the late 10th century. Muhammad bin Abi Amir was his real name; the Moors in Spain gave him the title of Al-Mansur due to his victories over the Christians.

During his many campaigns, Al-Mansur passed near this mountain and he was captivated by its beauty.

Pico Almanzor was climbed for the first time in September 1899 by M. González de Amezúa and José Ibrián. Espada, Ontañón and Abricarro made the first winter ascent in 1903. In 1960, a 1-metre-tall iron cross was placed on the summit.

== See also ==
- Circo de Gredos
