= Circo de Gredos =

- Glacial cirque
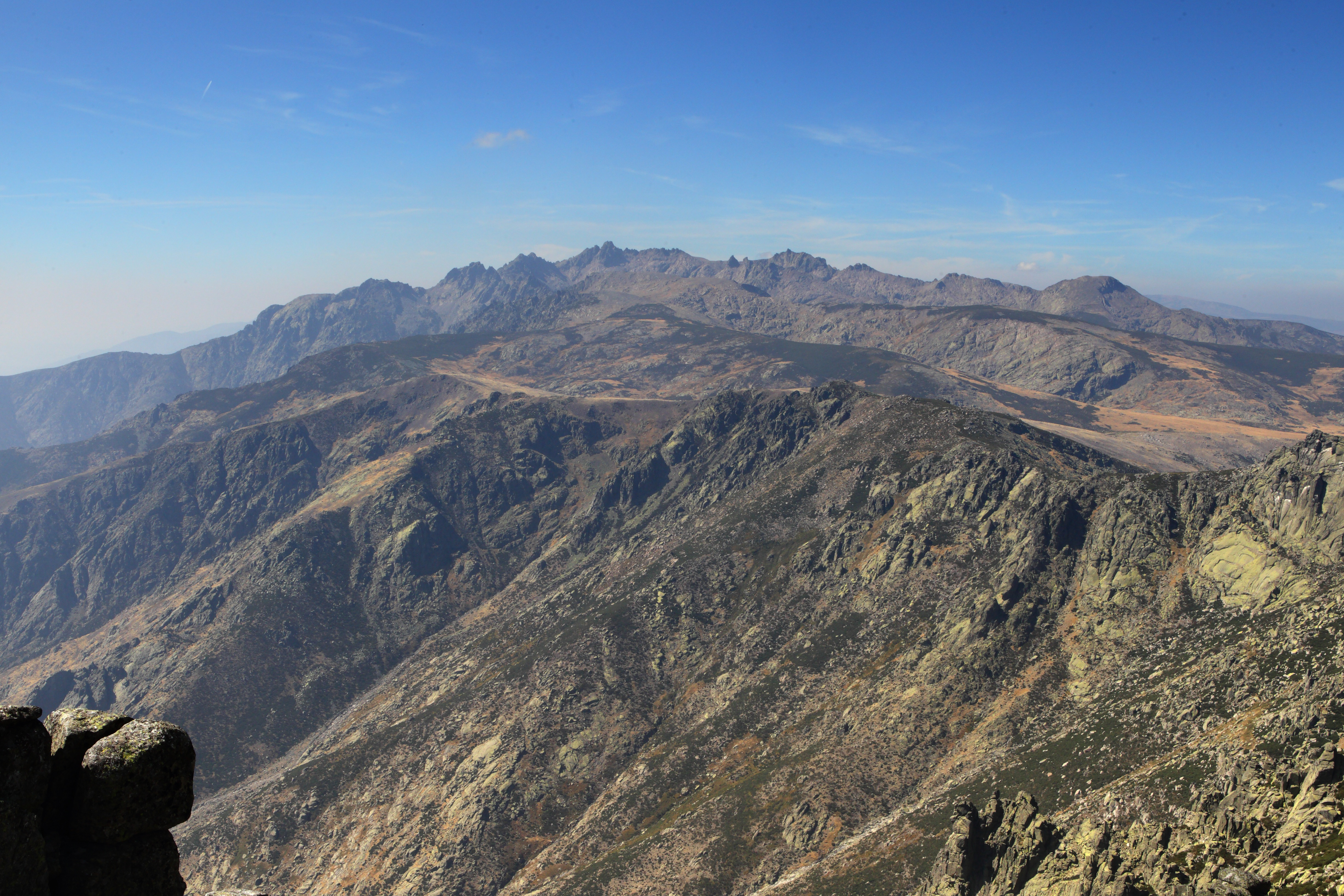
- View of the Circo de Gredos

- Location within Spain
- Coordinates: 40°14′50″N 5°17′00″W
- Location: Sierra de Gredos, Ávila, Castile and León, Spain
- Age: Quaternary
- Geology: Granite

Dimensions
  - Length: 2 km (1.2 mi)
  - Width: 1.5 km (0.93 mi)

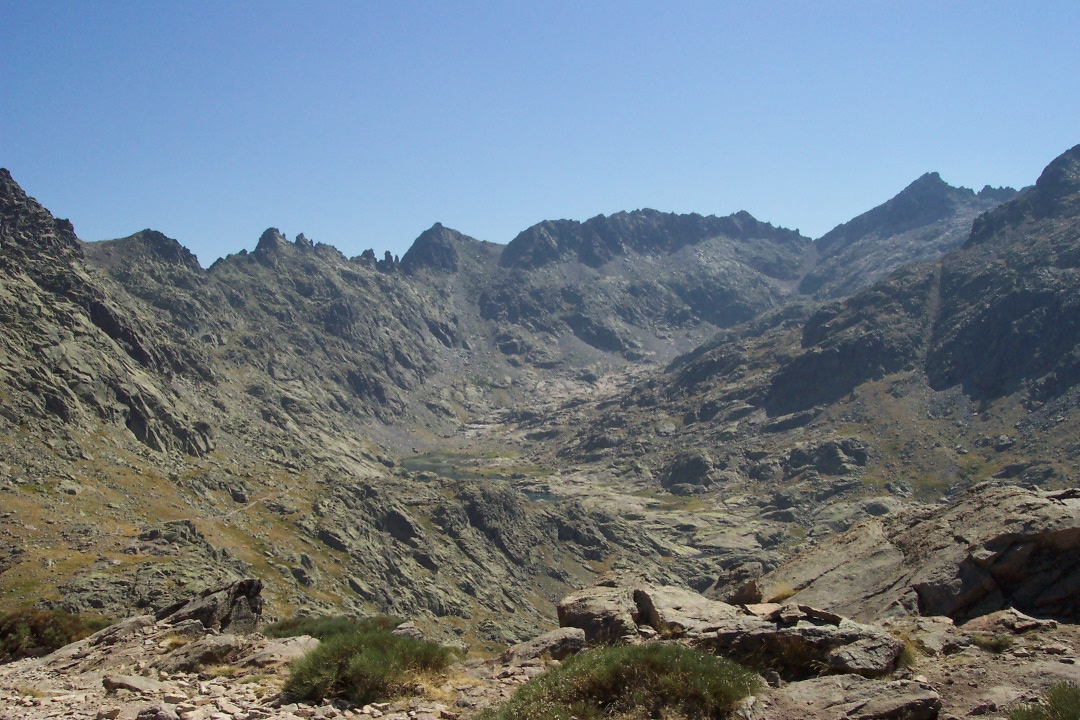
View of the Circo de Gredos in Summer, from the Barrerones.

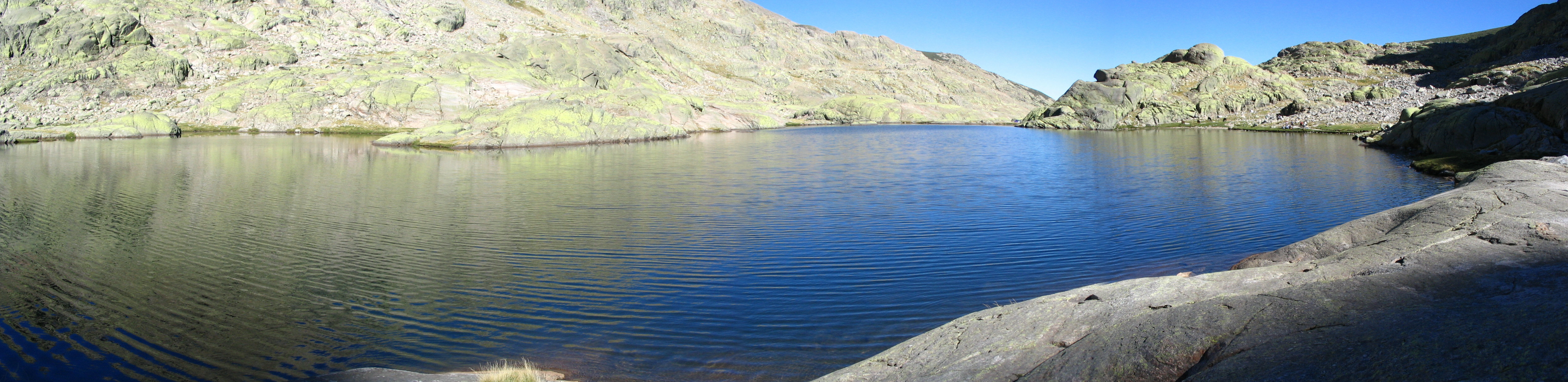
Laguna Grande de Gredos (Great Lagune of Gredos).

The Circo de Gredos is a glacial cirque in the central part of the north slope of the Sierra de Gredos (the main range in the Sistema Central mountains in central Spain). It is one of the most important areas in the Parque Regional de la Sierra de Gredos.

It is the most significant glacial cirque of the Sierra de Gredos, and of the entire Sistema Central, approximately 33 hectares (330,000 square meters) in area. At the west edge of the cirque is the summit Pico Almanzor, the highest of the range at 2,592 meters. In the northeast, at the bottom of the cirque, is the Laguna Grande de Gredos at a height of 1,940 metres. Next to this lake is the mountain refuge Elola, much frequented by mountaineers who intend to climb Pico Almanzor. The cirque is in the basin of the river Tormes, a tributary of the river Duero. It is part of the Sierra de Gredos Regional Park.

There is a route that leads to the cirque which is very busy with tourists and mountaineers, particularly in the summer. This path starts from parking that is known as the Plataforma de Gredos at 1,770 meters. The well defined route climbs South-West from here, and then across a grassy boggy moor to arrive at the Barrerones (2,210 metres). From here, the path descends south until reaching the Laguna Grande (or great lake) de Gredos.

== See also ==
- Cirque
- Sierra de Gredos
