= Villarejo del Valle =

- municipality
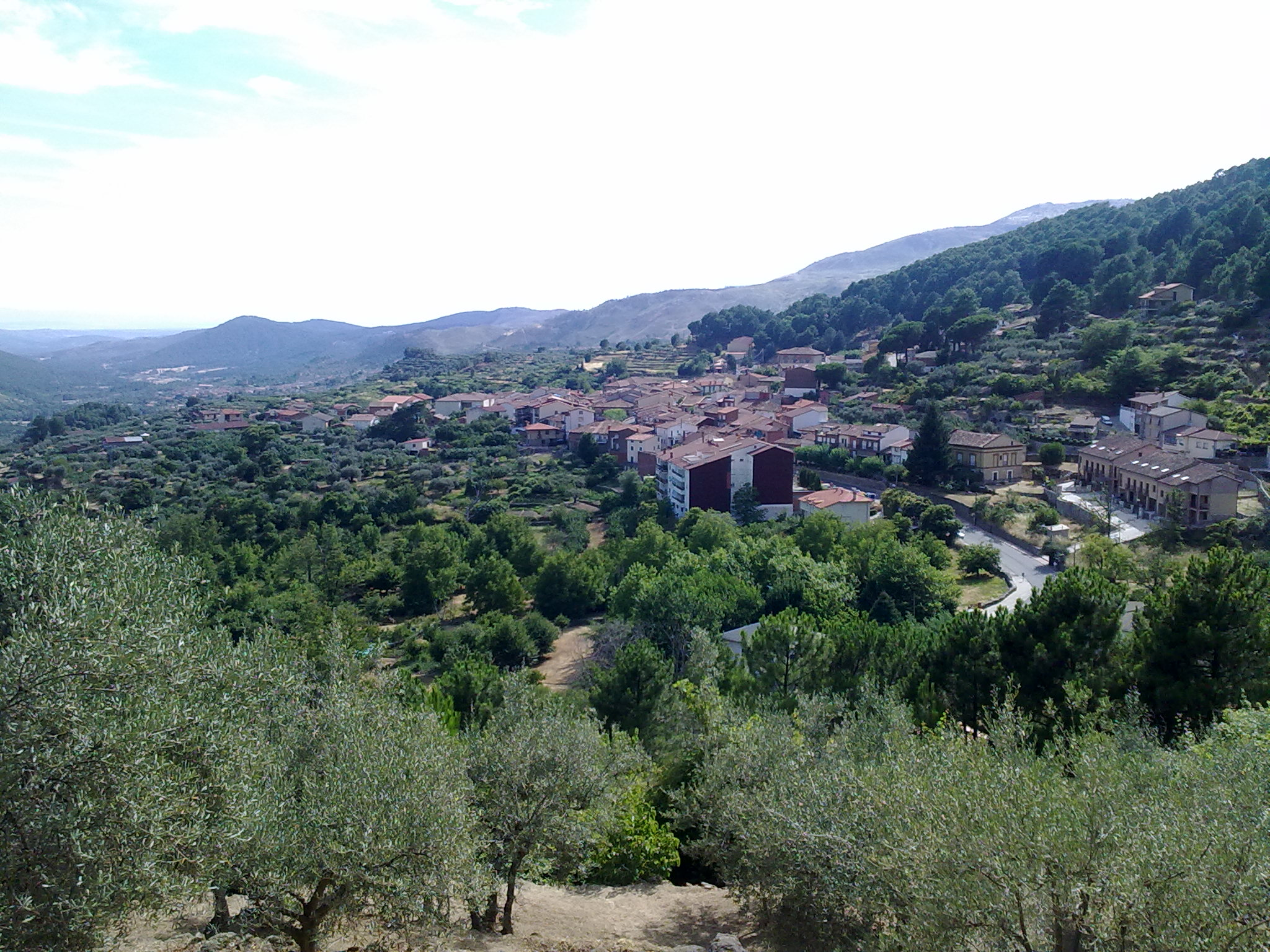
- View of Villarejo del Valle

- Flag Coat of arms

- Location in Spain. Villarejo del Valle (Spain)
- Coordinates: 40°17′09″N 4°59′51″W
- Country: Spain
- Autonomous community: Castile and León
- Province: Ávila
- Municipality: Villarejo del Valle

Area
  - Total: 41.60 km^{2} (16.06 sq mi)
- Elevation: 822 m (2,697 ft)

Population (2025-01-01)
  - Total: 304
  - Density: 7.31/km^{2} (18.9/sq mi)
- Time zone: UTC+1 (CET)
  - Summer (DST): UTC+2 (CEST)
- Website: Official website

Villarejo del Valle is a municipality located in the province of Ávila, Castile and León, Spain.

== Population ==
Historical population
Year	Pop.	±% p.a.
2023	327	—
2024	314	−3.98%
2025	304	−3.18%
Source: INE
