= El Arenal, Ávila =

El Arenal
- Municipality
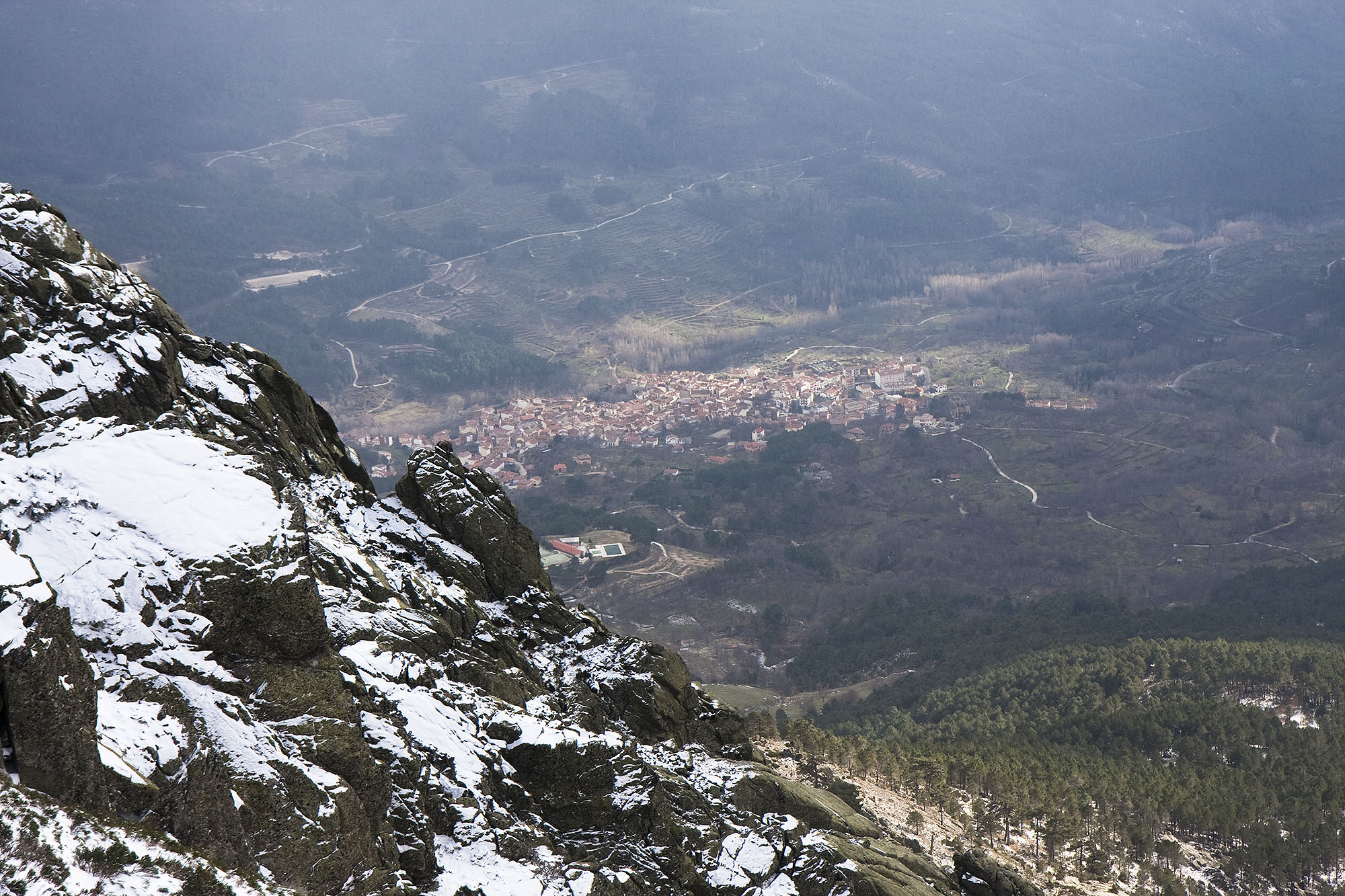
- El Arenal from the mountain pass of Cabrilla

- Coat of arms

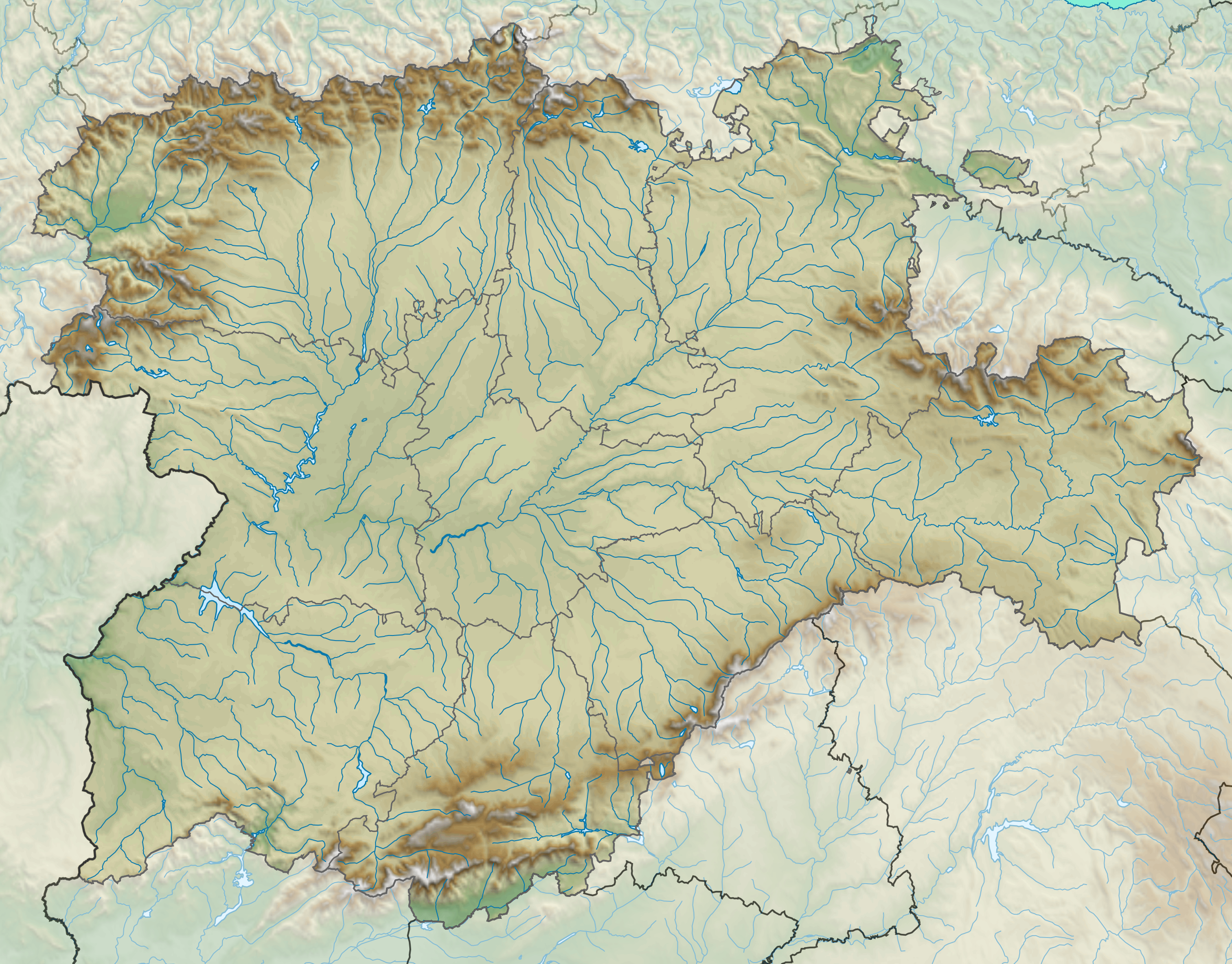
- Location in Spain. El Arenal (Spain)
- Coordinates: 40°15′53″N 5°05′14″W
- Country: Spain
- Autonomous community: Castile and León
- Province: Ávila

Area
  - Total: 27.08 km^{2} (10.46 sq mi)
- Elevation: 890 m (2,920 ft)

Population (2025-01-01)
  - Total: 961
  - Density: 35.5/km^{2} (91.9/sq mi)
- Time zone: UTC+1 (CET)
  - Summer (DST): UTC+2 (CEST)
- Postal code: 05416
- Website: Official website

El Arenal is a village and municipality of Spain located in the province of Ávila, within the autonomous community of Castile and León. The municipality has a total area of 27.08 km^{2}. It is part of the Sierra de Gredos Regional Park.

== Population ==
Historical population
| Year | Pop. | ±% p.a. |
|---|---|---|
| 2023 | 964 | — |
| 2024 | 978 | +1.45% |
| 2025 | 961 | −1.74% |
Source: INE
