= San Martín del Pimpollar =

- municipality
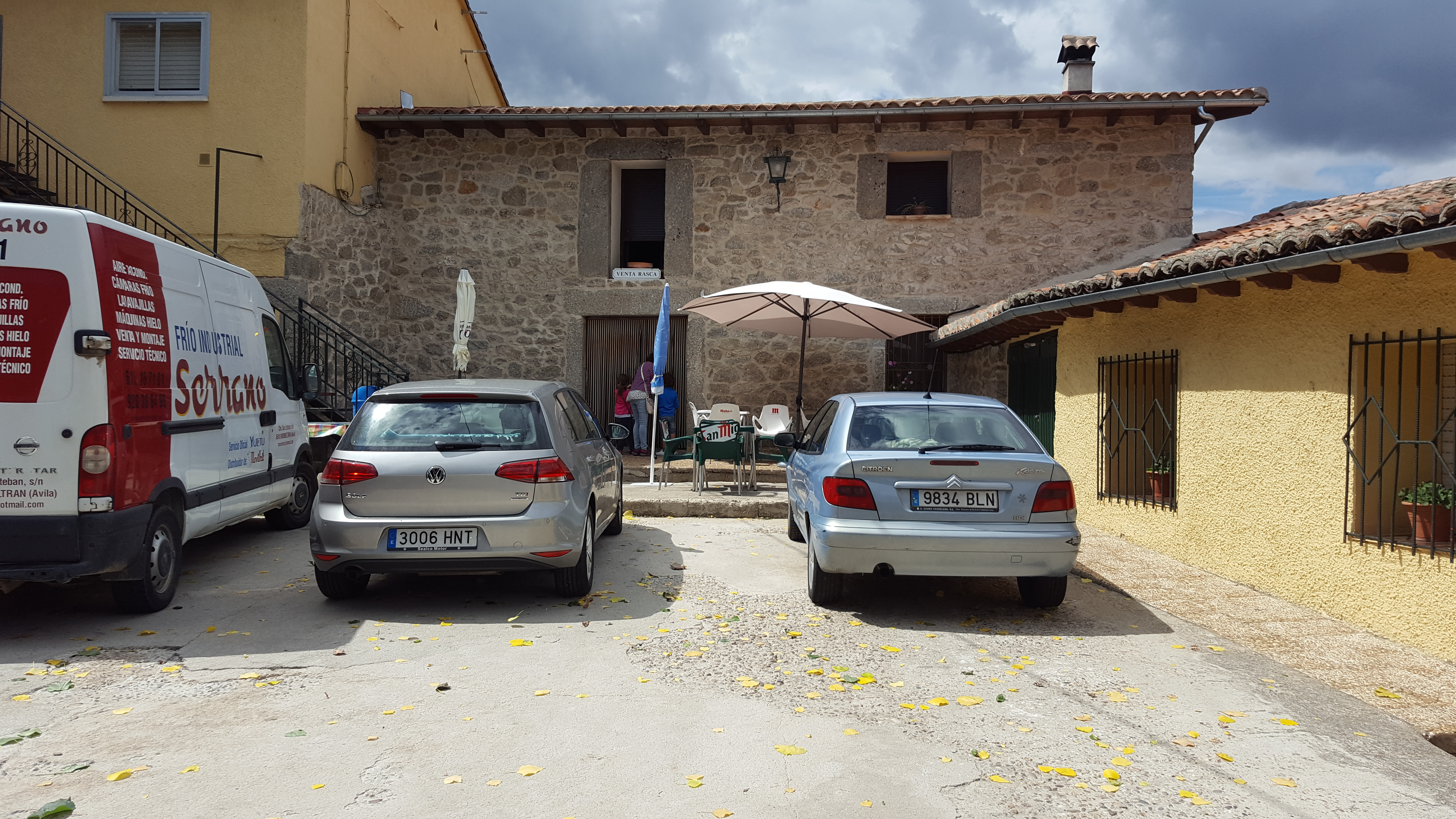
- Venta Rasca, San Martín del Pimpollar
- Flag Coat of arms
- Location in Spain. San Martín del Pimpollar (Spain)
- Coordinates: 40°22′07″N 5°03′15″W
- Country: Spain
- Autonomous community: Castile and León
- Province: Ávila
- Municipality: San Martín del Pimpollar

Area
  - Total: 45.64 km^{2} (17.62 sq mi)
- Elevation: 1,337 m (4,386 ft)

Population (2025-01-01)
  - Total: 221
  - Density: 4.84/km^{2} (12.5/sq mi)
- Time zone: UTC+1 (CET)
  - Summer (DST): UTC+2 (CEST)
- Website: Official website

San Martín del Pimpollar is a municipality in the province of Ávila, Castile and León, Spain.

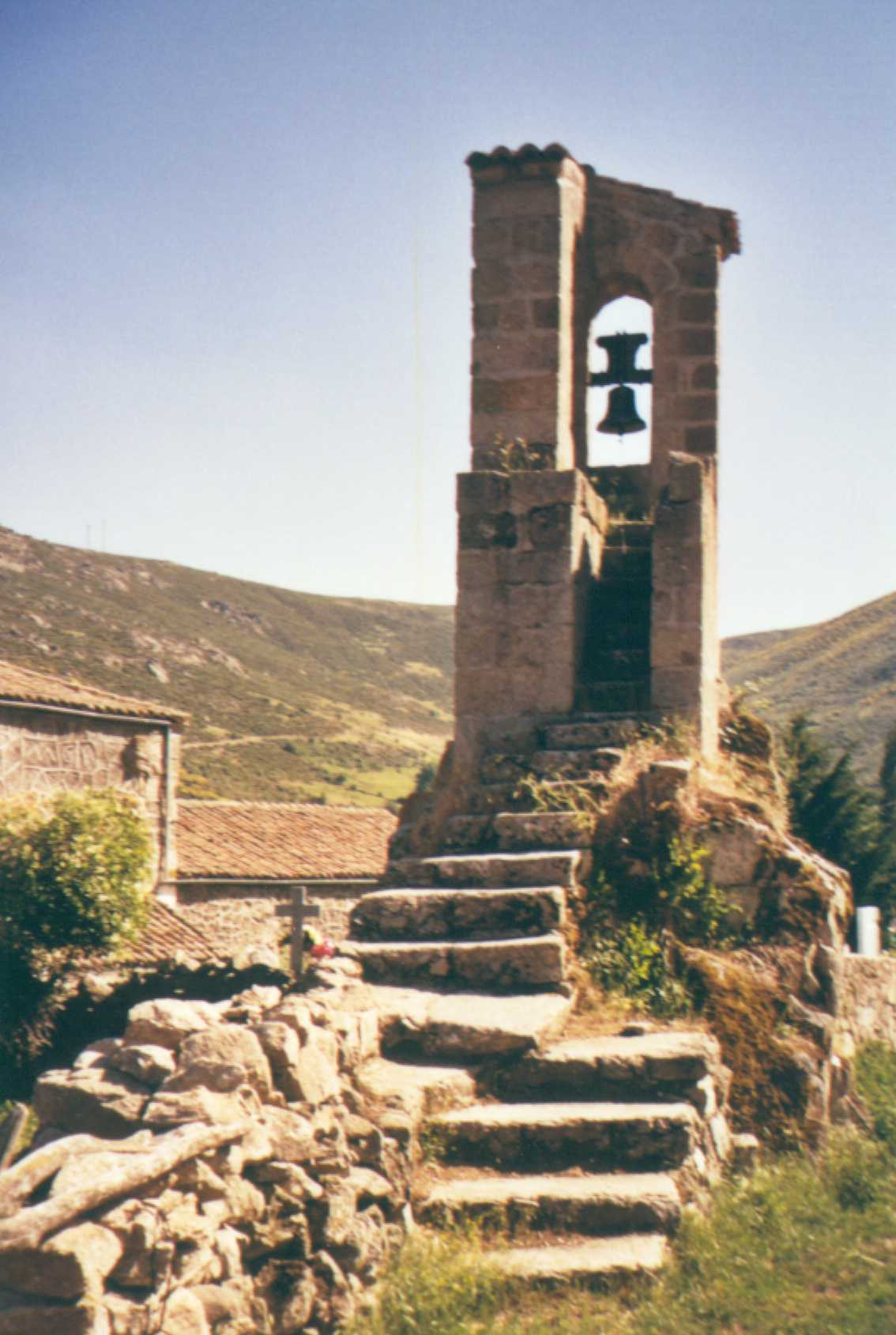
Iglesia Parroquial of Navalsauz, San Martín del Pimpollar.

== Population ==
Historical population
| Year | Pop. | ±% p.a. |
|---|---|---|
| 2023 | 220 | — |
| 2024 | 219 | −0.45% |
| 2025 | 221 | +0.91% |
Source: INE
