= Candeleda =

- Municipality
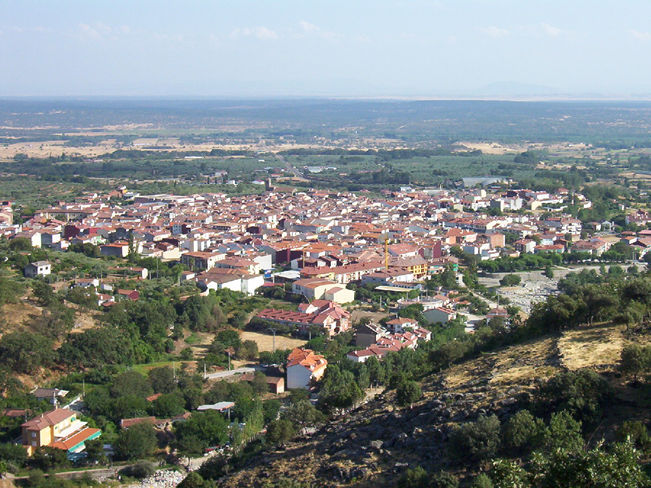
- View of Candeleda

- Flag Coat of arms

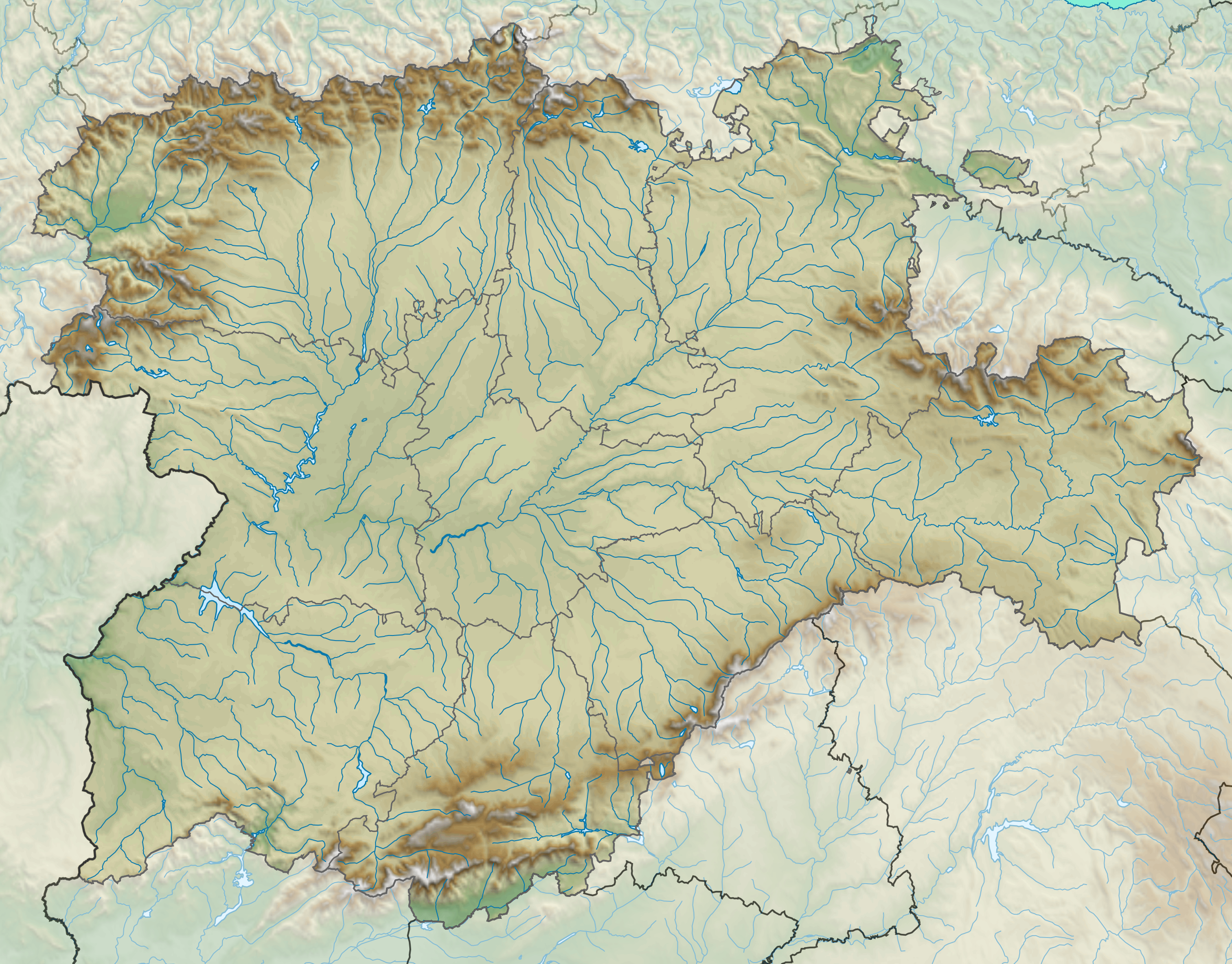
- Location in Spain. Candeleda (Spain)
- Coordinates: 40°09′21″N 5°14′28″W
- Country: Spain
- Autonomous community: Castile and León
- Province: Ávila

Area
  - Total: 215.52 km^{2} (83.21 sq mi)
- Elevation: 428 m (1,404 ft)

Population (2025-01-01)
  - Total: 5,003
  - Density: 23.21/km^{2} (60.12/sq mi)
- Time zone: UTC+1 (CET)
  - Summer (DST): UTC+2 (CEST)
- Website: www.ayuntamientocandeleda.es

Candeleda (Spanish pronunciation: [kandeˈleða]) is a town and municipality located in the province of Ávila, in the autonomous community of Castile and León, Spain. According to the 2011 INE census, the municipality has a population of 5,213 inhabitants, making it the fifth largest municipality in the province after Ávila –the capital–, Arévalo, Arenas de San Pedro and Las Navas del Marqués. The town is located on the southern hillside of the Gredos mountains, 432 m above sea level, giving it a microclimate with a thermal regime of mild winters and hot summers and average summer temperatures of 26 °C.

Candeleda is related, economically and culturally, with the neighbouring town of Arenas de San Pedro and the Tiétar valley in Castile and León, the region of La Vera in Extremadura, as well as the Campana de Oropesa region and the city of Talavera de la Reina in Castile-La Mancha. Due to the relatively long distance between Candeleda and Ávila, links with the capital are limited to administrative and medical matters. The village festival and processions in honour of the town's patron saint, the Virgin of Chilla, are held annually on the second and third Sunday of September.

== Identitary elements ==
=== Symbols ===
According to the Official Gazette of Castile and Leon the heraldic blazon is:

Shield with Spanish form, cut and half way broken. First of Dávalos, on an azure field a golden castle, with tree towers on it and the central one being higher than the others, battlements, sable stone mansory and gules windows and doors, with a silver and gules compony bordure. Second of Estúñiga, which is of silver, a sable ribbon highlighted by a gold chain placed as an orle. Third, in azure, a silver hermitage with an oak, grass in vert. As crown at the top, the Spanish Royal Crown.

And the description of the flag is:

Square flag of 1x1 proportion, of crimson colour, and in its centre the municipal coat of arms in their colours.

=== Toponymy and demonym ===
The most accepted theory about the origin of the town's name states that it is a combination of the Latin Candela –not in the sense of light or candle, but in that of chestnut blossom or holm oaks present in the municipality– together with the -etum suffix, which denotes abundance. The demonym for the inhabitants is Candeledano.

== Physical geography ==
=== Location ===
Candeleda municipality is located in the south west of the Gredos mountains, Ávila province, bordering the provinces of Cáceres (Extremadura) and Toledo (Castile-La Mancha). It is located 101 km from the province's capital. The closest cities are Talavera de la Reina (Toledo), 61 km away, and Plasencia (Cáceres), 120 km away. The altitude of the municipality ranges from the 252 m of the Rosarito reservoir and the 2592 m of the Almanzor peak, the highest point of the Central System mountains range.

=== Hydrography ===
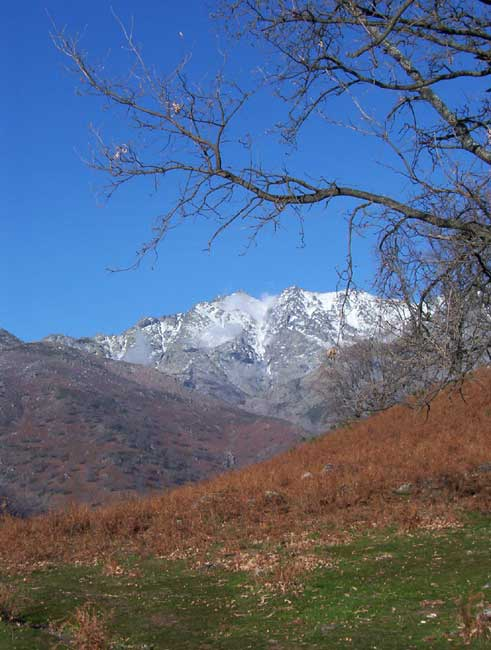
Sierra de Gredos as seen from Candeleda.

On the south end of the municipality, at the border with the province of Toledo has its course the Tiétar river. The Tiétar river runs along the border with the province of Toledo, south of the municipality. Several tributaries –the Santa Maria, Chilla and Alardos gorges– have their sources in the Gredos mountains and descend perpendicularly to the mountains and the Tiétar river and join the latter at the end of their course.

The Rosarito reservoir, between the provinces of Ávila and Toledo, holds Tiétar’s water before it enters into Extremadura. This reservoir built in 1958 is used for water supply, hydropower generation and recreational purposes, and has a capacity of 82 hm3 and an area of 1475 ha.

=== Climate ===
The broad altitude range of the municipality results in different climate zones. According to the Köppen climate classification, in the main urban area at 428 m the climate is classified as Csa, a Mediterranean temperate climate with mild winters and hot summers with average temperatures of around 26 °C. The peaks of the Gredos mountains, the highest of which is the Almanzor peak, have a Dsb continental climate. Total rainfall in the municipality is very abundant, influenced by the geographical position of Candeleda, located south from the Sierra de Gredos mountain range.

Climate data for Candeleda
Month	Jan	Feb	Mar	Apr	May	Jun	Jul	Aug	Sep	Oct	Nov	Dec	Year
Daily mean °C (°F)	7.90 (46.22)	9.20 (48.56)	11.80 (53.24)	14.30 (57.74)	18.00 (64.40)	22.90 (73.22)	26.40 (79.52)	25.90 (78.62)	23.50 (74.30)	17.50 (63.50)	11.50 (52.70)	7.90 (46.22)	16.40 (61.52)
Average precipitation mm (inches)	157.70 (6.21)	151.10 (5.95)	75.90 (2.99)	87.90 (3.46)	84.60 (3.33)	37.90 (1.49)	10.40 (0.41)	12.50 (0.49)	41.40 (1.63)	100.20 (3.94)	127.40 (5.02)	169.10 (6.66)	1,056.1 (41.58)
Source: Ministerio de Agricultura, Alimentación y Medio Ambiente. Datos de precipitación para el periodo 1967-1987 y de temperatura para el periodo 1961-1987 en Candeleda

=== Flora and fauna ===
The municipality's different bioclimatic floors allow a great variety of vegetation. Chestnuts, Pyrenean oaks and maritime pines are abundant in the middle floor, while holm oaks and cork oaks occupy the lower floors. The flatter lands are most suitable for agricultural use.

== El Raso ==
El Raso is a village dependent on Candeleda located in the western part of the municipality 10 km away from the town core and at an altitude of 720 m. According to the INE, El Raso had a population of 482 people in 2011. It was founded in 1934 as a town devoted to intensive goat farming on the southern slopes of the Gredos mountains. The village is now devoted to goat husbandry, agriculture and rural tourism. Its patron saint is St. James, and it holds an annual festival on 25 July featuring heifers, fire bulls and popular dances.

== Demography ==
In 2011 Candeleda had 5,213 inhabitants. 24% of the total population was above 64 years of age. 239 residents (4.6% of the total) originated from foreign countries, most commonly Romanian (91 people) and Colombian (20 people). In total, 101 people came from South America (42.3% of all foreign residents).

Historical population
Year	Pop.	±% p.a.
2023	5,001	—
2024	5,031	+0.60%
2025	5,003	−0.56%
Source: INE

== Administration and politics ==
Mandate	Mayor	Party
1979–1983		UCD
1983–1987		
1987–1991		PSOE
1991–1995	José Antonio Pérez Suárez	PP
1995–1999	Ladislao López López	PSOE
1999–2003	José Antonio Pérez Suárez	PP
2003–2007	Miguel Hernández Alcojor	PSOE
2007–2011	Rosa María Sánchez Infante (2007–2008); Miguel Hernández Alcojor (2008–2011)	PP; PSOE
2011–	José María Monforte Carrasco	PP

Municipal elections in Candeleda
Party	2011			2007			2003		
Party	Votes	%	Town councillors	Votes	%	Town councillors	Votes	%	Town councillors
Partido Popular (PP)	1.846	50,85	7	1.198	32,55	5	1.537	42,55	6
Partido Socialista Obrero Español (PSOE)	1.114	30,69	4	1.591	43,23	6	1.342	37,15	5
El Partido de Castilla y León - Candidatura Independiente (PCAL CI)	466	12,84	2	-	-	-	-	-	-
None of the above	58	1,60	-	36	0,98	-	46	1,27	-
Spoilt vote	146	4,02	-	89	2,42	-	55	1,52	-
Abstention	667	15,52	-	739	16,72	-	730	16,81	-

== Economy ==
The municipality relies heavily on the tertiary sector of the economy (56.3% of workers in 2011) and it is largely dependent on tourism. In 2011, right in the middle of the Spanish financial crisis, the total number of unemployed people was 512 (15.5% of the active population).

=== Primary sector ===
In 2007 19.9% of the working population was employed in the primary sector.

64.2% of farmland (13,737.3 ha) was devoted to pasture. 4.2% of land (899.4 ha) was devoted to fields of tree crops, 50.3% of which were olive groves (452.2 ha) and 49.3% (442.9 ha) orchards. 13.8% of land (2960.6 ha) were forest species (no orchard species).

Livestock is of great importance in the municipality. Candeleda is the town with the largest number of goats in the province of Ávila. The 22,000 goats of the municipality provide employment for 130 families and generate economic activity based around the production of fresh, cured and semi-cured goat's cheese.

The municipality is within the area of designation of origin of Carne de Ávila (Meat of Ávila), beef from the species Avileña-Negra ibérica.

=== Secondary sector ===
The secondary sector, especially if construction is excluded, is not of great importance for the economy of Candeleda. In 2007, at the height of the housing bubble, construction employed 21.6% of workers. In the same period 6.6% of the labour market were employed in industry (excluding construction).

=== Tertiary sector ===
This is the main economic sector employing 56.3% of the active population, with a great reliance on tourism. In 2011 the municipality (including the town itself, El Raso and the disseminated areas) had 158 retail establishments, 25 restaurants, 71 bars, 5 banks, 3 drug stores, 3 gas stations and 10 hotels or hostels. Rural tourism has been the fastest growing industry in the last few decades.

By the 1990s the annual number of visitors to the Tiétar Valley region was estimated at 100,000. The majority of visitors were from Madrid. The municipality has developed a number of regulated facilities to accommodate tourists, either hotel accommodation (7 establishments with a total of 154 beds) or cottages (146 beds). More than half of the companies in the region providing activities related with rural tourism –9 of a total of 15– are based in Candeleda. They offer house riding, summer camps and caravan parks. The real estate sector is also important since many people have second homes in the region.

== Social Facilities ==
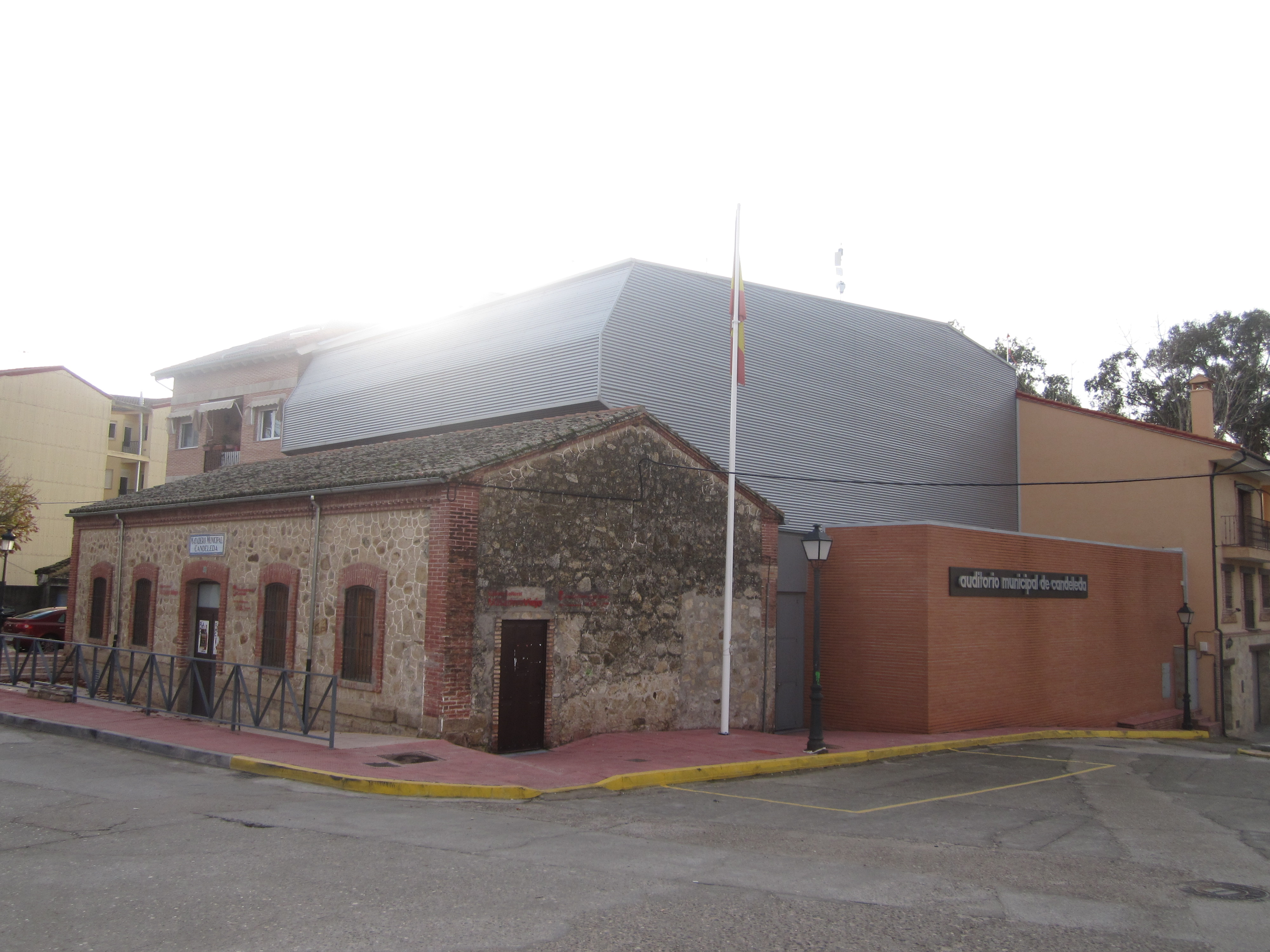
Candeleda's Municipal Auditorium

=== Education and Culture ===
For nursery and primary education, the municipality has the Almanzor Public Primary School, in the town itself, and the Vetonia Primary School in El Raso. Secondary education is provided by the Candavera High school in the town itself.

Candeleda has a municipal library with two floors (the first floor is a study room and the second a children's room). Built in 1993, it is located in the Camilo José Cela street close to El Castillo square.

The town has a municipal auditorium located in the La Cañada area. Opened in 2010, there is a main room with 310 seats and two smaller rooms, one of which is used for rehearsals. The construction of the auditorium had a total cost of around €570.000 .

=== Health ===
Candeleda has a health centre run by the Castile and León Health Service (SACYL). SACYL have signed several agreements with the Junta of Communities of Castile-La Mancha so the population of Candeleda can be treated at the Talavera de la Reina (Toledo) hospital in emergency cases, births, oncology, same day surgery and in the specialists units of neurology, endocrinology and rheumatology.

=== Sport ===
Candeleda has a small covered arena close to the Candavera High School, which is used as a municipal basketball court and five-a-side football pitch.

2.7 km west of the village is the municipal stadium "El Llano". This is a football ground, with dimensions 103x68 m and open air stands, seating around 500 people. Next to the stadium is the municipal campsite, which has a heated swimming pool.

The municipality also has a golf course located 7 km west of the urban core. It is open all year round.

== Architectonic heritage ==
- Castro Celta de El Raso
- The shrine of Our Lady of Chilla
- The church of Our Lady of the Assumption
- The San Blas hermitage
- The Pillory
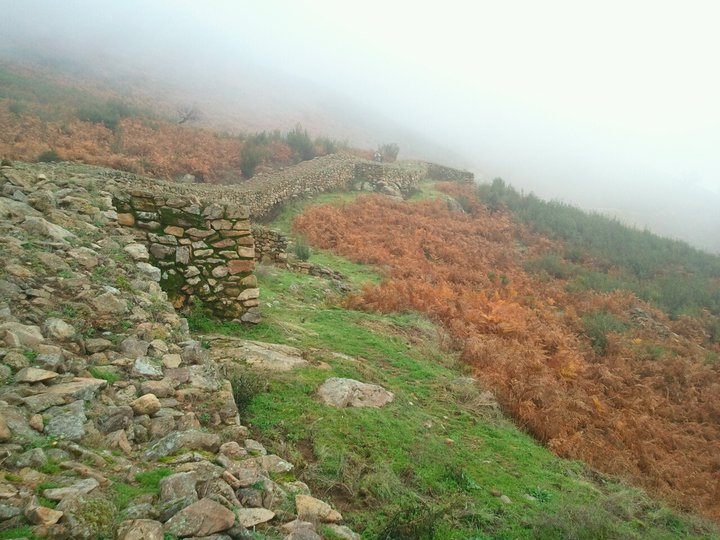
Castro Celta de El Raso wall

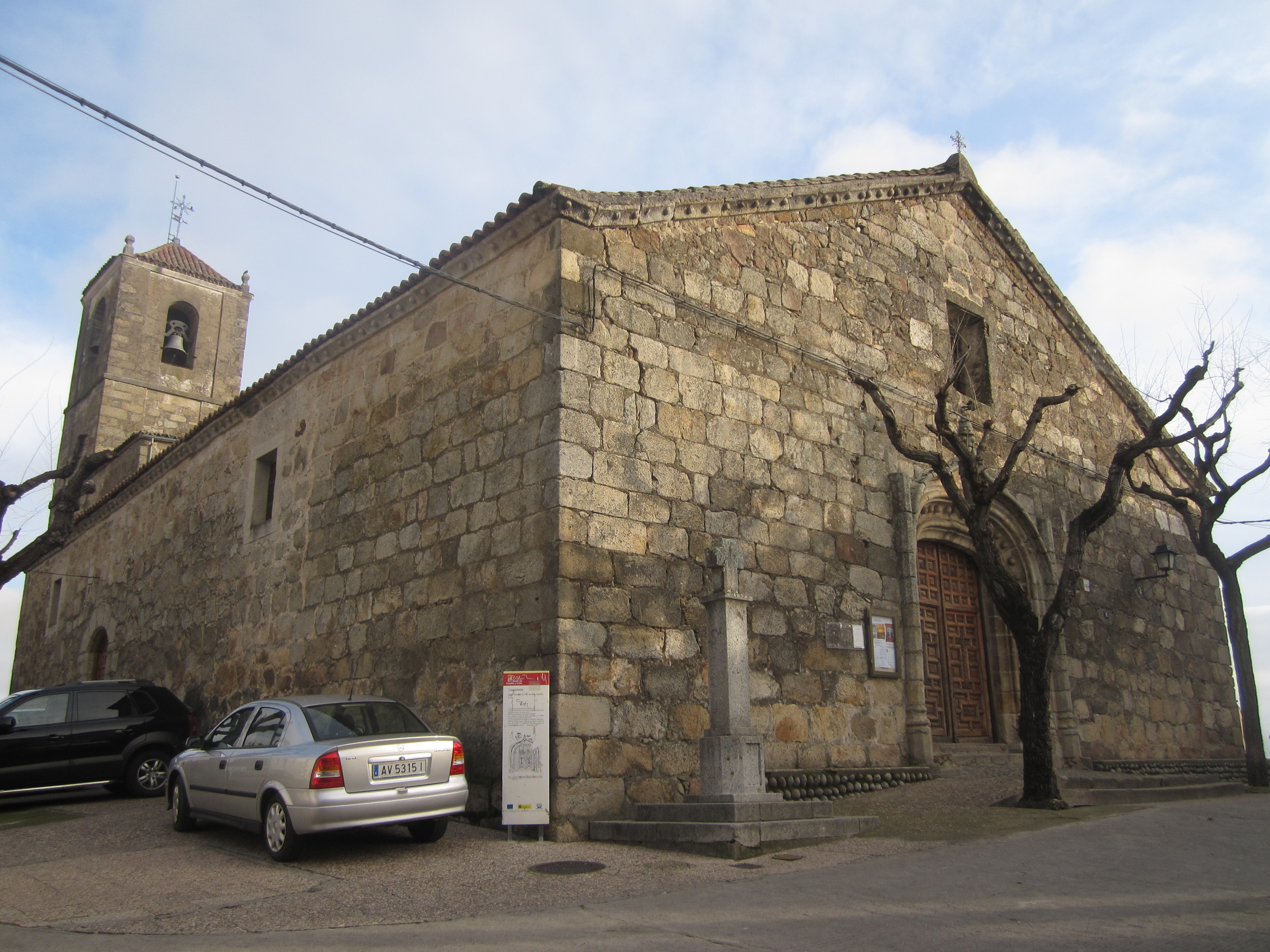
Church of Our Lady of the Assumption

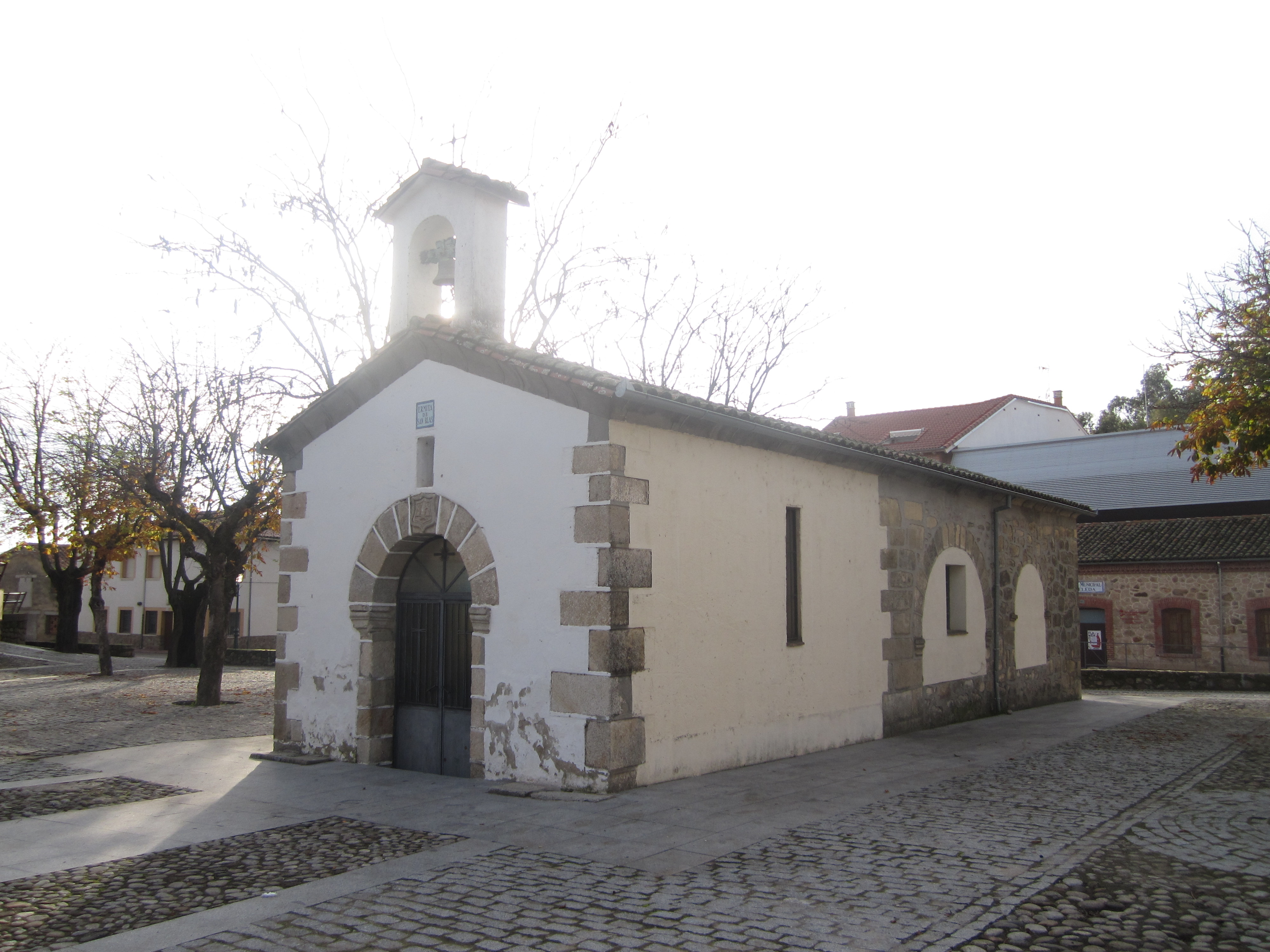
Saint Blaise's Hermitage

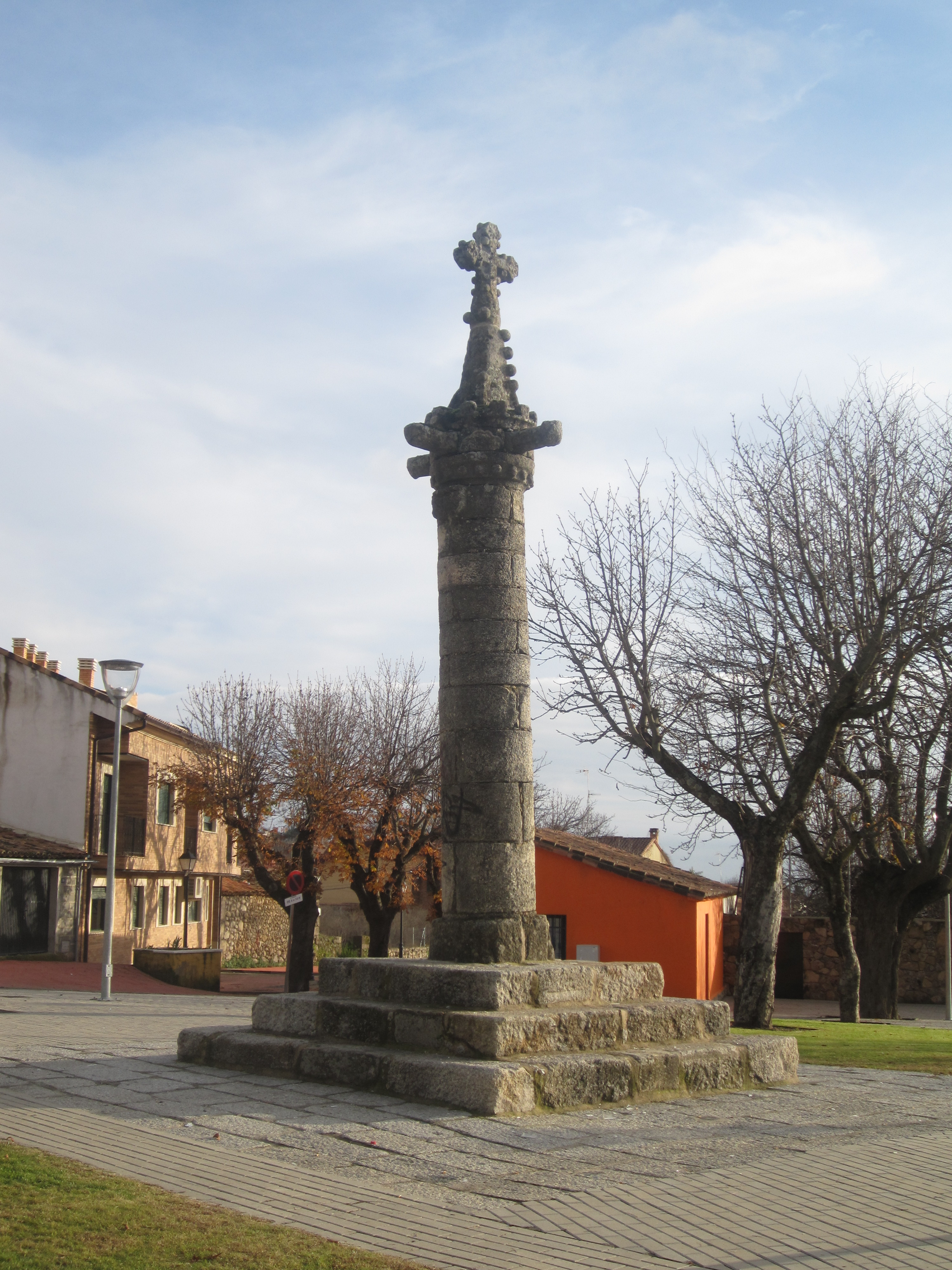
Candeleda's Pillory

== Sights ==
- Ethnographic Museum

The museum, located in a building on Corredera Street that was once the local school and an antimalarial dispensary, has two floors each of 100 m2 with three different exhibitions, two of them temporary (in 2012 «Candeleda, a royal visit "and" Celts in Southern Gredos'). The third is permanent and ethnographic in nature and you can see a coat of arms from the sixteenth century, as well as items donated by townspeople, such as two millstones from the Iron Age and an apothecary pestle. The museum, which opened in April 2012, cost € 377 000 to complete.

- Casa de la Judería (Jewry's House)

The House of Jewry is a small museum and cultural space used to publicise the history, culture and traditional cuisine of Candeleda. Paintings, photographs, sculptures and other art forms are displayed in the exhibition. The Inquisition in Candeleda was held in this building several centuries ago. It was opened as a museum on Juderia Street in August 2010.

- Tin Toy Museum House of Flowers

It is a museum which houses more than 2,000 pieces of tin toys. It is located in one of the most striking traditional buildings in the town's Main Square.

- Vado de los Fresnos

The Vado De Los Fresnos is an animal reserve with a variety of local species living on the banks of the Rosarito reservoir.

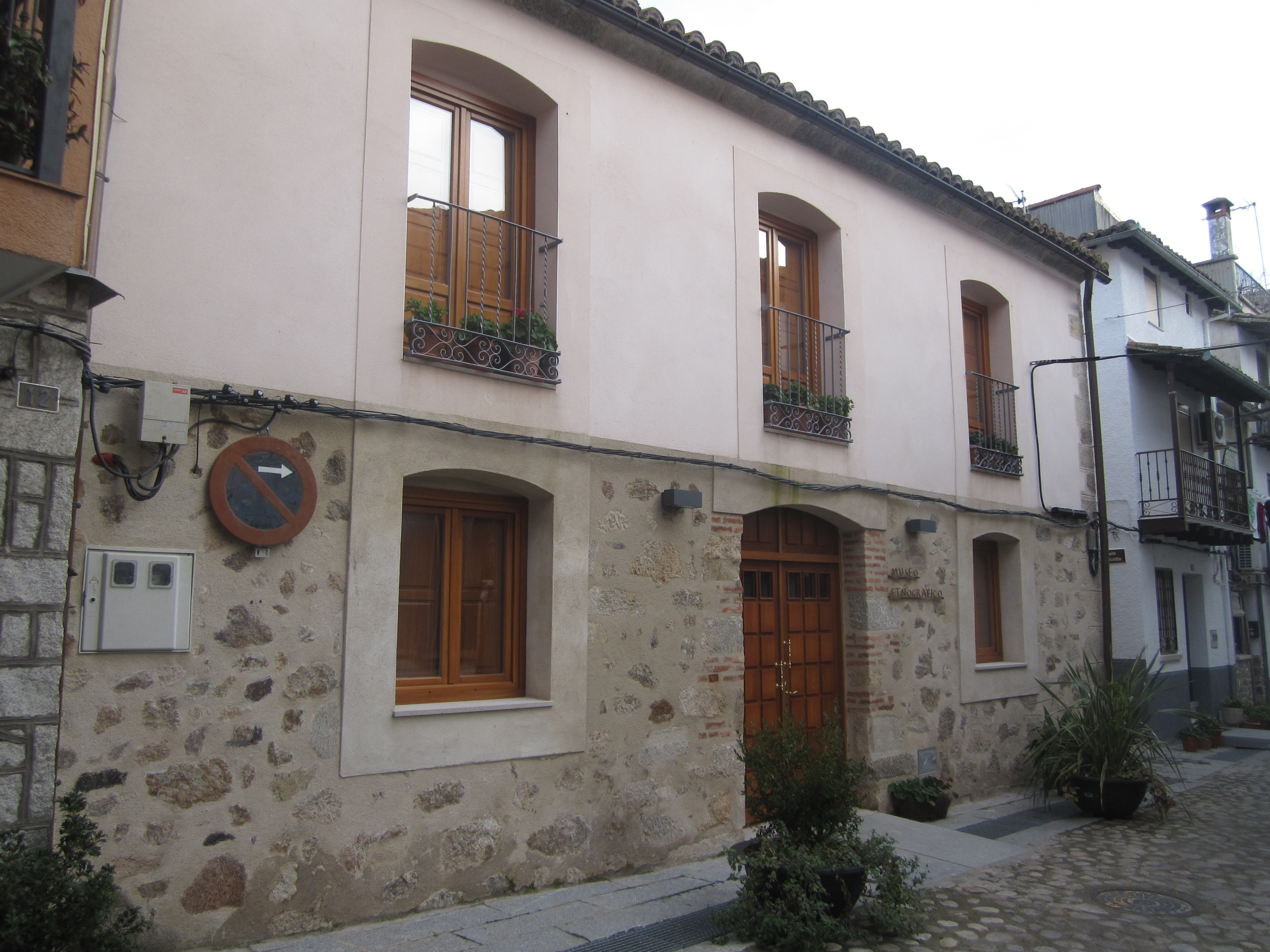
Ethnographic Museum

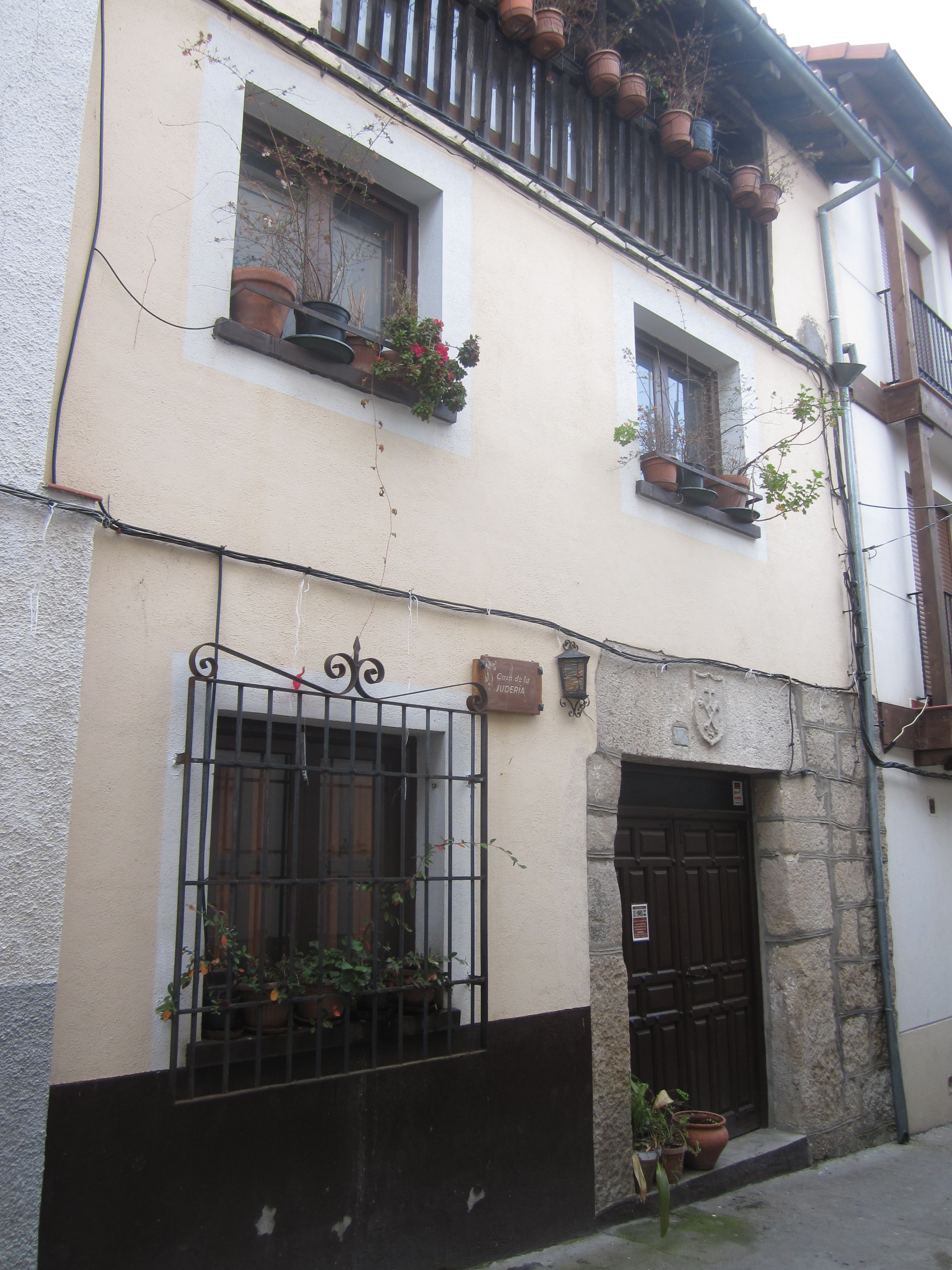
Casa de la Judería

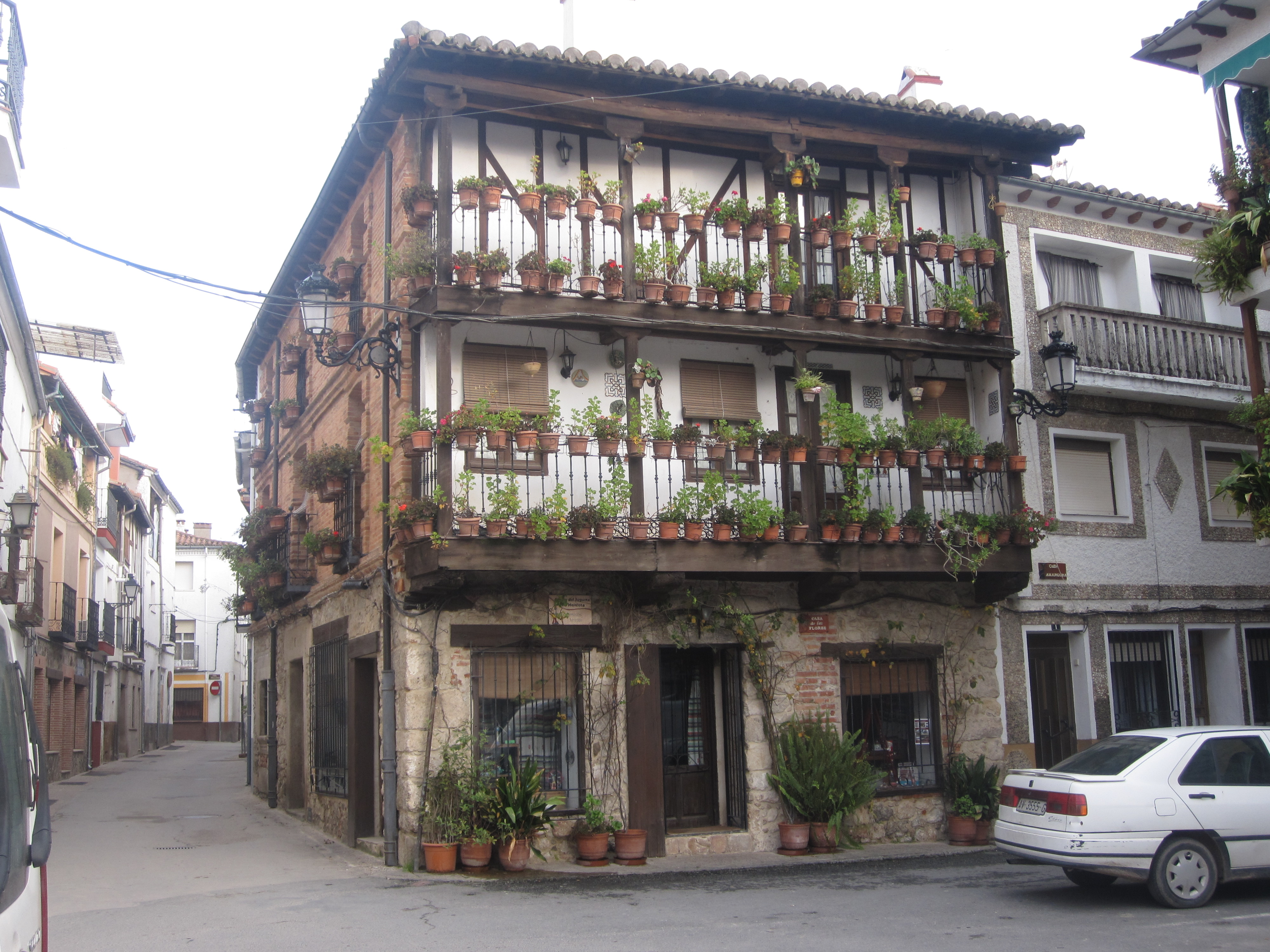
House of Flowers, Tin Toy Museum home

== Village festival and folklore ==
The village festival and processions in honour of the town's patron saint, the Virgin of Chilla, are held annually on the second and third Sunday of September. The event has been declared a Fiesta of National Tourist Interest. Of lesser importance, Las Candelas are held on 2 February, with traditional "iluminarias" (bonfires that young people jump over). The following day, 3 February, is Saint Blaise, known colloquially as chorizo day, where people gather to eat Spanish donuts and chorizo obtained from pig slaughters at farms in the town.

Livestock markets, once an important part of the local economy, are still held in April and August, but they now serve mainly as a public event.

Candeleda is an ancient and rural population centre that preserves traditions and forms of social relationships like rondas, informal groups of neighbours and friends who come together during the village festival or at Christmas to sing, play music and dance in the street with guitars, lutes, cauldrons, mortars and pestles, Anisette bottles and also zambombas (rustic drums) at Christmas. Traditional musical genres have been preserved especially rondeñas, malagueñas, and jotas for dancing, and also tonás and round or wedding songs. The Pedro Vaquero Festival of folk, named after the Candeledan musical anthropologist, is held every August. 2012 was the eighteenth year that the town held the festival.

== Gastronomy ==
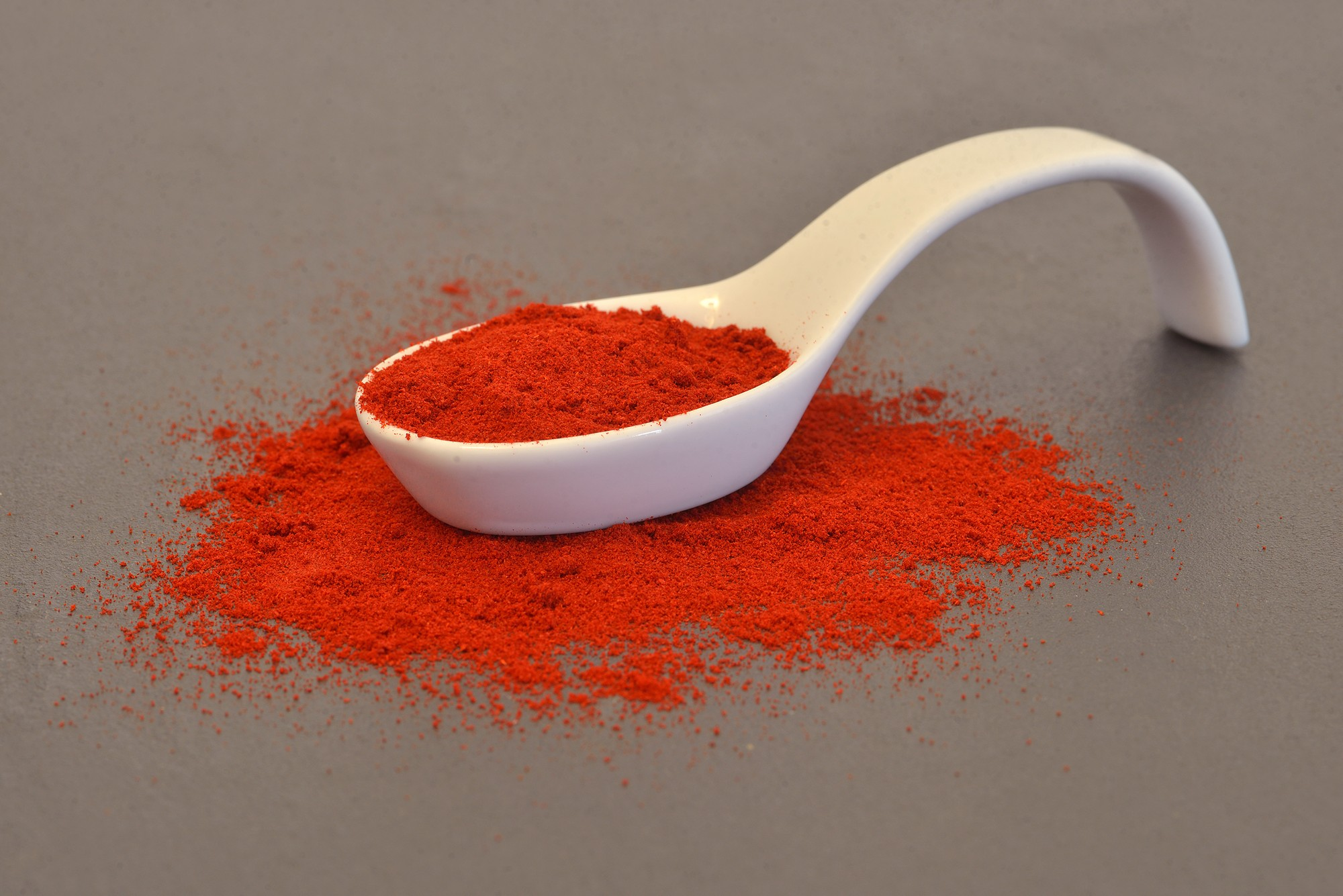
Paprika in a bowl.

The town shares many of the traits of the province's cuisine but has some particularities due to its location next to the region of Extremadura and La Vera. One of the most outstanding products cultivated in the town is the paprika of Candeleda, similar to that of the neighbouring Extremeñian region of La Vera and its paprika with designation of origin.

It is used to flavour a wide variety of traditional dishes, such as Riojan potatoes, Galizian octopus, patatas bravas and chorizo.

== Candeleda-related celebrities ==
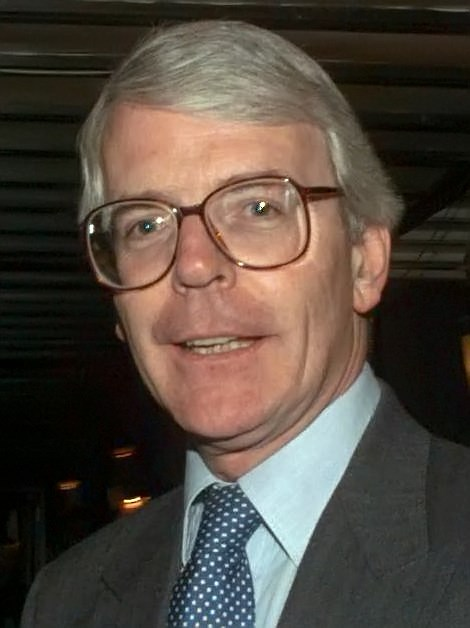
John Major.

- The Conservative politician and former British Foreign Secretary Lord Tristan Garel-Jones (February 28, 1941 - 24 March 2020), who owned a house in the municipality.
- The politician and former British Prime Minister John Major (March 29, 1943 -), who has spent several summers in the town since the late 1980s, visiting the home of his colleague and fellow politician Tristan Garel-Jones.
