= Zapardiel de la Ribera =

- municipality
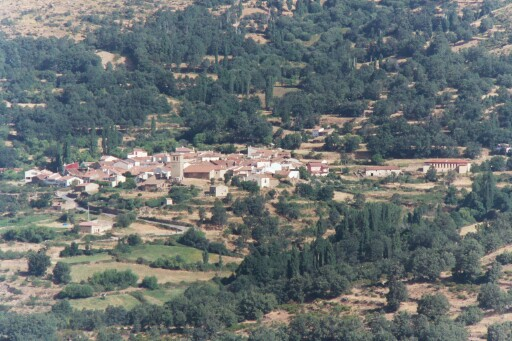

- Location in Spain. Zapardiel de la Ribera (Spain)
- Coordinates: 40°21′20″N 5°19′43″W
- Country: Spain
- Autonomous community: Castile and León
- Province: Ávila

Area
  - Total: 43.88 km^{2} (16.94 sq mi)
- Elevation: 1,349 m (4,426 ft)

Population (2025-01-01)
  - Total: 90
  - Density: 2.1/km^{2} (5.3/sq mi)
- Time zone: UTC+1 (CET)
  - Summer (DST): UTC+2 (CEST)
- Website: Official website

Zapardiel de la Ribera is a municipality located in the province of Ávila, Castile and León, Spain.

== Population ==
Historical population
Year	Pop.	±% p.a.
2023	84	—
2024	92	+9.52%
2025	90	−2.17%
Source: INE
