= Alto Tormes =

Coordinates: 40°25′14″N 5°29′31″W

- Comarca
- Location in Salamanca
- Country: Spain
- Autonomous community: Castile and León
- Province: Salamanca
- Comarca: Comarca de Guijuelo

Area
  - Total: 202.19 km^{2} (78.07 sq mi)

Population
  - Total: 1,434
  - Density: 7.092/km^{2} (18.37/sq mi)
- Time zone: UTC+1 (CET)
  - Summer (DST): CEST

Alto Tormes is a comarca of Ávila and a is a subcomarca of Guijuelo in the province of Salamanca and Ávila, Castile and León.

The portion in Salamanca contains the following municipalities: Cespedosa de Tormes, Gallegos de Solmirón, Navamorales, Puente del Congosto, El Tejado, Guijo de Ávila and La Tala.

The portion in Ávila contains the following municipalities: Bohoyo, Aldeanueva de Santa Cruz, Avellaneda, La Aldehuela, La Horcajada, El Losar, Junciana, Tormellas, Becedas, Navalonguilla, Los Llanos de Tormes, Gilbuena, Gilgarcía, El Barco de Ávila, Navatejares, Umbrias, Solana de Ávila, San Bartolome de Bejar, Neila de San Miguel, Medinilla, San Lorenzo de Tormes, Santa María de los Caballeros, Santiago de Tormes, La Carrera and Puerto Castilla.
