= Jerte River =

River in western Spain

- Río Jerte
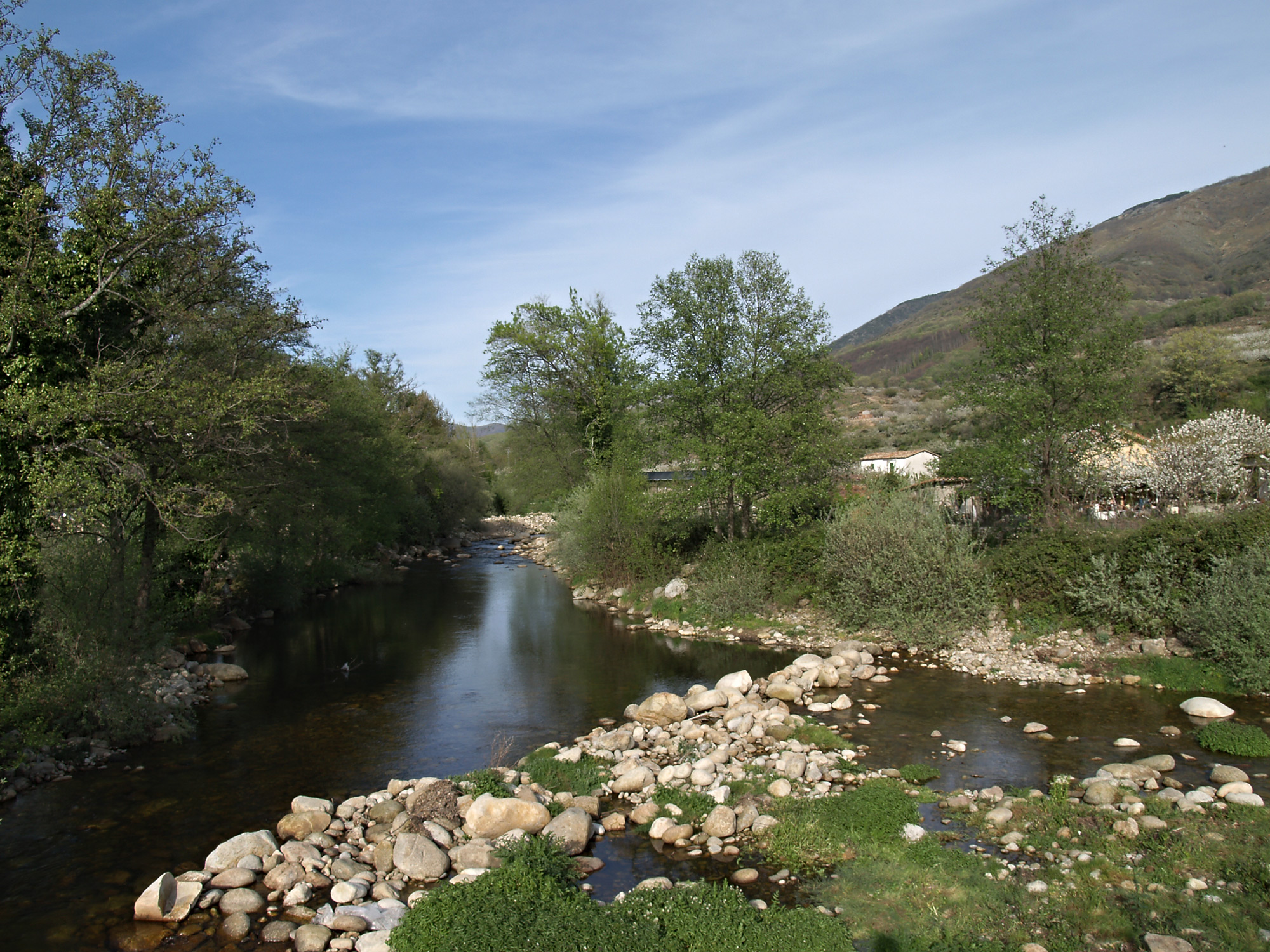
- The Jerte River as it passes through the town of Jerte
- Location: Province of Cáceres, Extremadura, Spain
- Part of: Tagus Basin
- Primary inflows: Mouth location: Alagón River; Source location: Sierra de Gredos (Sistema Central)
- Max. length: 70 km (43 mi)
- Surface elevation: 300 m (980 ft)

The Jerte River is a river in the interior of the Iberian Peninsula, a tributary of the Alagón River within the Tagus basin. Its course runs entirely through the northern part of the Spanish province of Cáceres, where it forms the Jerte Valley. With a length of about seventy kilometres, it rises in Tornavacas and flows into the Alagón at Galisteo.

== Course ==
Its source lies within the municipal territory of Tornavacas, in the southeastern corner of the Sierra de Candelario, near the boundary with the municipalities of Solana de Ávila and Puerto Castilla in the Province of Ávila. The exact place of origin is a mountainous spot known as "dehesa de la Campana", at an elevation of about 1800 m a.s.l., halfway between the Calvitero peak, the highest point in Extremadura, and the Puerto de Tornavacas mountain pass. On the other side of these mountains, very close to the Jerte, rises the Aravalle River, which belongs to the Duero Basin.

The river is well known for forming, along its upper course, the Jerte Valley, one of the geographical features of Spain that best embodies the definition of a valley: along an almost straight line some fifty kilometres long, the river descends towards the city of Plasencia through a depression between two parallel mountain ranges. From its source at 1800 m a.s.l., it reaches Plasencia at an elevation of around 345 m, which gives an idea of how rugged its basin is along this stretch, where it successively passes through the town centres of Tornavacas, Jerte, Cabezuela del Valle and Navaconcejo, later forming the boundary between Valdastillas and Rebollar and subsequently the boundary between Casas del Castañar and El Torno. The straightness of its course is due to the geological effect of the Plasencia Fault, which crosses the valley. In 1973, the valley was protected as a "picturesque landscape", and it is currently listed as an asset of cultural interest in the category of historic site.

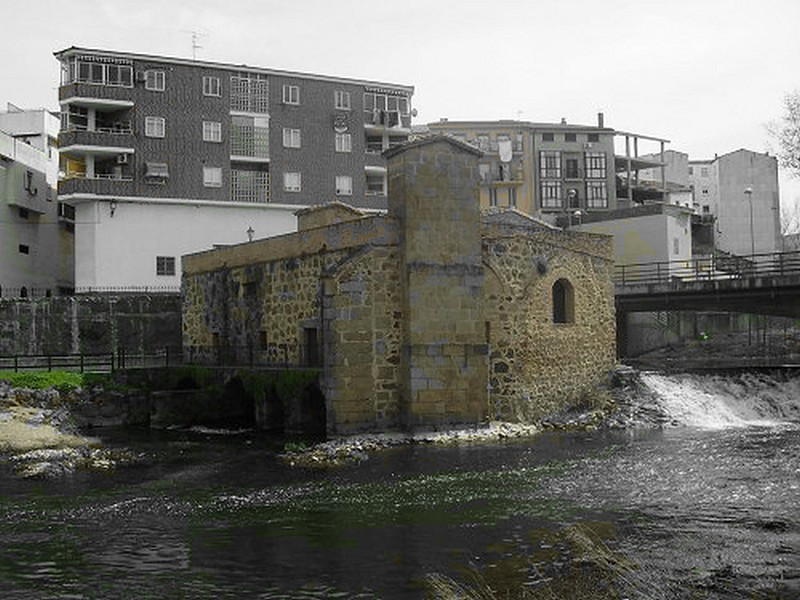
Molino de la Casca mill in Plasencia

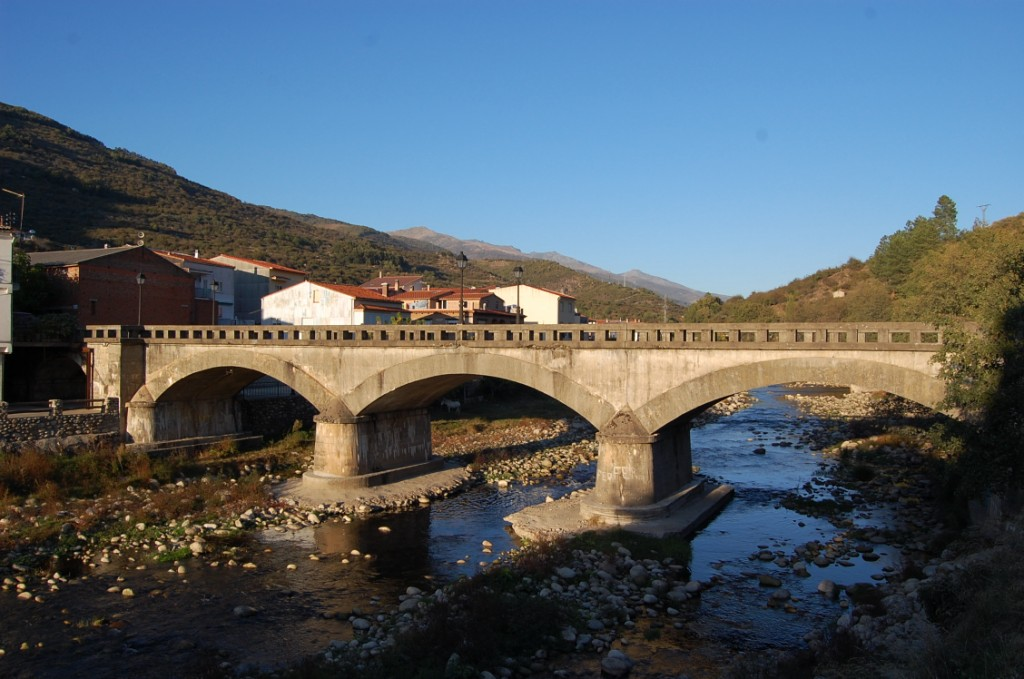
Bridge over the Jerte River in Navaconcejo

The city of Plasencia is the main town through which the river flows. At the point where the Jerte enters the municipal area of Plasencia, the Plasencia Reservoir has existed since 1985, which provides an easy supply of water to the population by simple gravity. The straight stretch of the river ends as it enters the town centre of Plasencia, where a long river island between both banks divides the river into two and forms the Parque de la Isla ("Island Park"). After the channel reunites, it reaches the Parque del Cachón, the lowest point of the Plasencia Fault, where the Jerte valley meets that of the Arroyo de Fuentidueñas stream; this latter valley, around which the Plasencia industrial estate has developed, is a continuation of the Jerte valley along the same fault, but with elevation running in the opposite direction, which forces the Jerte to find an escape route towards the northwest. The historic centre of the city is located beside this bend in the river.

After finding a gap between the Montes de Traslasierra and the Sierra del Merengue, the river enters a plain through which its lower course flows past the towns of Carcaboso, Aldehuela de Jerte and Galisteo; in this plain, irrigated crops have developed considerably since the 20th century. Its mouth, on the left bank of the Alagón River, lies about 2 km southwest of Galisteo, where the Alagón River marks the municipal boundary with Alagón del Río.

== Tributaries ==
From its source at the head of the valley, the river gathers the waters contributed by important mountain gorges such as San Martín, Becedas, Papúos, Los Infiernos, Buitres, Honduras, Puria, Bonal, and others. On days of heavy rainfall, sudden floods are very common. It is a beautiful mountain river, with the highest specific discharge of all rivers in Extremadura.
