= Valle del Jerte =

- Comarca
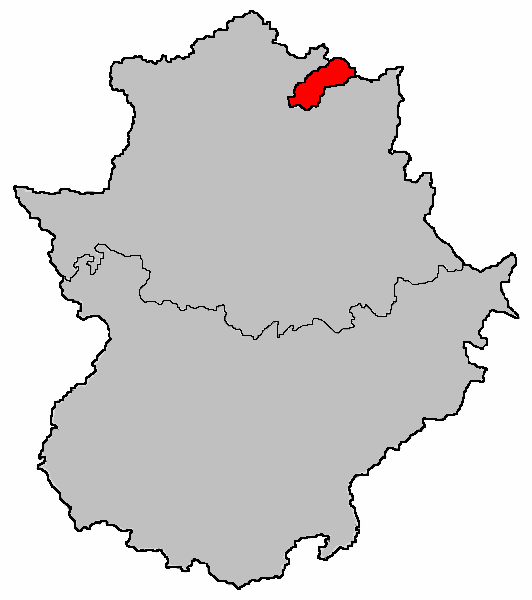
- Coordinates: 40°8′23″N 5°52′50″W
- Country: Spain
- Autonomous community: Extremadura
- Province: Cáceres

Area
  - Total: 373 km^{2} (144 sq mi)

Population (2015)
  - Total: 11,123
  - Density: 29.8/km^{2} (77.2/sq mi)

Valle del Jerte is a comarca and mancomunidad in the province of Cáceres, Spain. It contains the following municipalities:

- Barrado
- Cabezuela del Valle
- Cabrero
- Casas del Castañar
- El Torno
- Jerte
- Navaconcejo
- Piornal
- Rebollar
- Tornavacas
- Valdastillas
