= La Aldehuela =

- Municipality
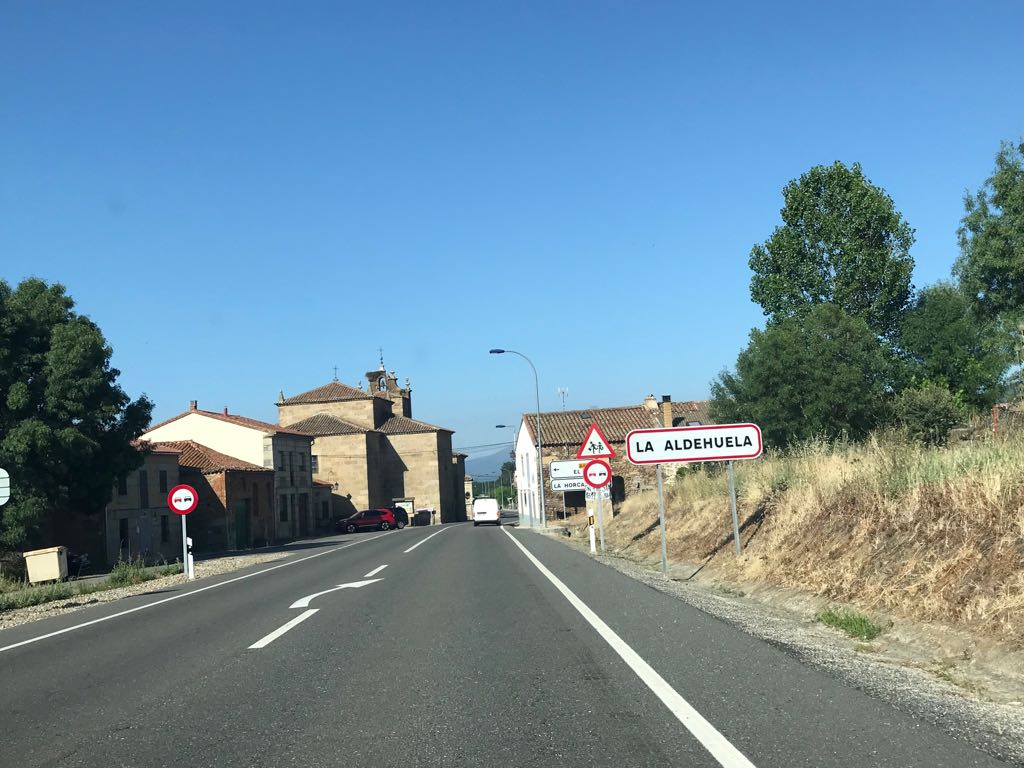

- Flag Coat of arms
- Interactive map of La Aldehuela
- Location in Spain. La Aldehuela (Castile and León)
- Coordinates: 40°24′39″N 5°24′33″W
- Country: Spain
- Autonomous community: Castile and León
- Province: Ávila

Area
  - Total: 17.04 km^{2} (6.58 sq mi)

Population (2025-01-01)
  - Total: 141
  - Density: 8.27/km^{2} (21.4/sq mi)
- Time zone: UTC+1 (CET)
  - Summer (DST): UTC+2 (CEST)
- Website: Official website

La Aldehuela is a municipality of Spain in the province of Ávila, in the autonomous community of Castile and León. It has an area of 17.04 km².

Since 2019, José Hernández Lázaro has served as mayor of La Aldehuela.

== Services ==
- Extension of the Colegio Rural Agrupado (Joint Rural School) El Calvitero.
- In 1998 a pharmacy was opened at the village.
- The municipality belongs to Mancomunidad de Servicios de Barco-Piedrahíta.
- Local Secretary Mondays, Wednesdays and Fridays from 10 to 2.
- 4 rural houses at Las Navas and El Rehoyo.
- The nearest office bank is at 6 km. in La Horcajada.

== Population ==
Historical population
Year	Pop.	±% p.a.
2023	148	—
2024	143	−3.38%
2025	141	−1.40%
Source: INE

La Aldehuela contains 5 districts:

- Los Molinos, Ávila (The Mills)
- Las Navas
- El Rehoyo
- Solanas del Carrascal (Carrascal is a holm-oak forest)
- Las Solanillas

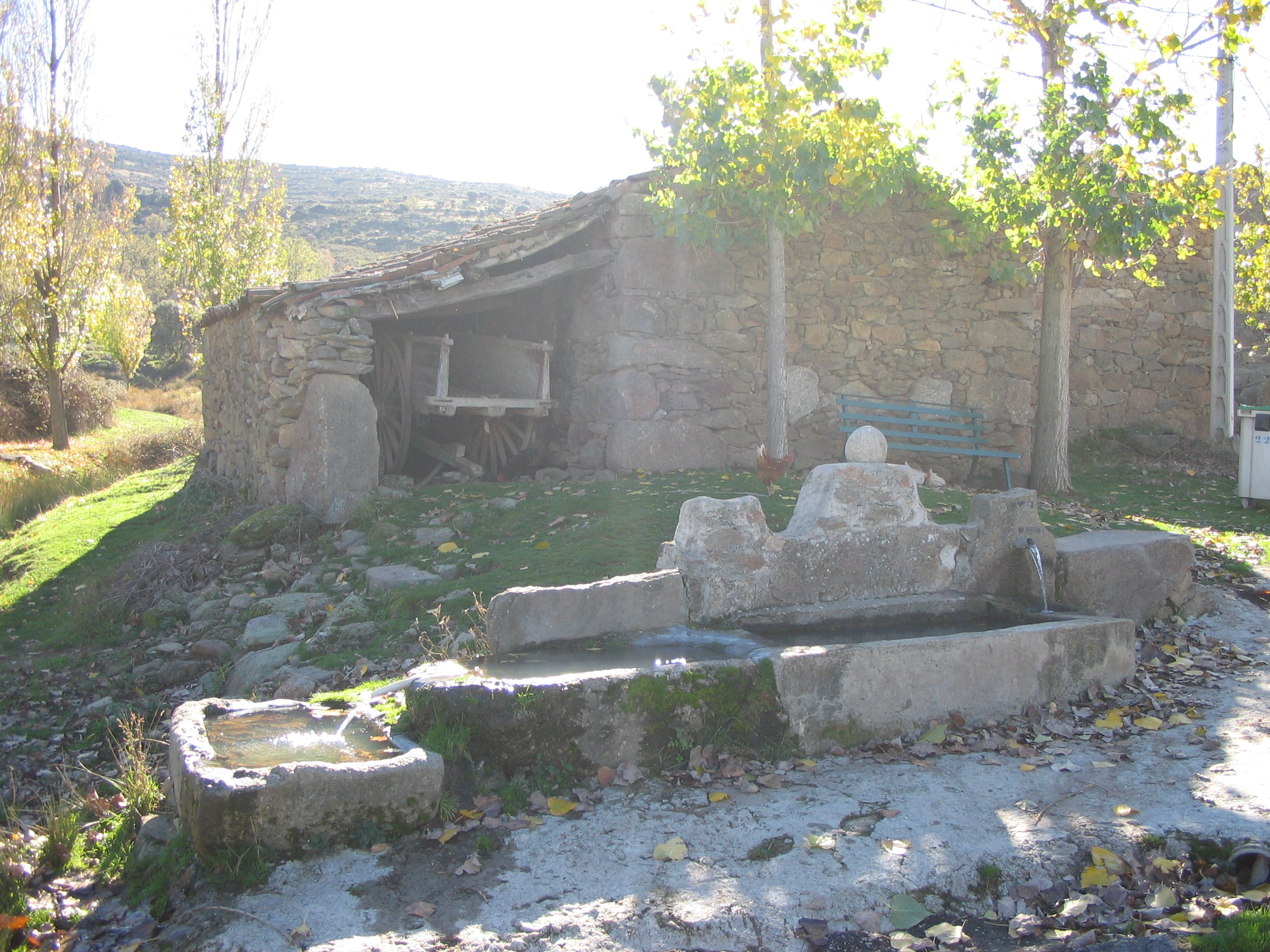
Sights of Las Navas, at La Aldehuela village, in Ávila (Spain)

== Geography ==
The municipality is 70 kilometers from Ávila by the N-110 road. The 319.5 road divides the main body of population of the village. La Aldehuela extends along and is contained within the fertile and narrow valley of the Caballeruelos River, running from northeast to southwest. The valley is delimited by the mountain range of Piedrahíta to the southeast and cols near La Horcajada towards the northwest, giving passage from the Valley of the Corneja to the valley of the Tormes. This circumstance has the effect that the village's local allegiance varies, although generally, according to the sources, it considers itself as part of the region of the Valley of the Corneja. The Delegation of Ávila however assigns the municipality to the macroregion of Barco-Piedrahi'ta (in any case most western of the province).

Nearest mountains are: Tayaruela (1,963 m.s), the Meadow, Los Barranqueros, Level Head, la Campana, Caballera Rock and Los Rullos.

The Caballeruelos River is very irregular and every summer is almost dried up. It rises near the mountain ranges of the Flagstone and of Santiago. Numerous streams and springs flow into it (Rebollar, Bullicio, Gargantilla and others). The Caballeruelos finally ends the Tormes at the municipal term of Vallehondo after passing through Santa María de los Caballeros and San Lorenzo de Tormes.

Before Javier del Burgo provincial reorganization in 1833 La Aldehuela belonged to the province of Salamanca, as the rest of the natural area of the Higher Tormes.

== Co-ordinated of the different population centers ==
- El Rehoyo: 40°25′33″N 5°23′20″W
- Las Navas: 40°24′14″N 5°24′05″W

== Nature ==
The common fauna is made up of domesticated animals that live in the farms of the villagers (horses, cows, ewes, hens and pigs), as well as of wild animals like the wild boars, foxes, bats and jinetas. The most common birds are sparrows, finches, kites, storks, eagles, sleets. As far as the amphibians they are common frogs, salamanders, toads and snakes, lizards and small lizards of different type. And La Aldehuela has a variety of insects and invertebrates exists.

The flora of La Aldehuela is rich and is varied or in pedanías located in slopes of the valley or the level one. The most common trees are walnuts, willows, oaks, holly, oaks or brown. The more common shrubs and grass are magaleños brooms, romero, hawthorns, agatunas, guardalobo, oregano and ortigas meñas. As common cultures honor fruit trees, cereals and vegetables.

== Transports and communications ==
La Aldehuela has a bus stop of two daily lines of bus to Madrid, in the route that the capital with Béjar or Plasencia, both managed by CEVESA. Monday to Saturdays leave three buses from La Aldehuela and return four from Madrid. The municipality also has a bus service at demand managed by the same company that unites all his pedanías with Boat of Ávila.

The small village has regular cover of movable telephony in practically all its municipal term. Between 2007 and 2008 it is anticipated that pedanía of the Rehoyo receives service of connection to Internet of broadband via satellite, thanks to a project of the Ministry of Industry, Tourism and Promotion.

== Cultural heritage ==
- Church: it has a single ship with a head of rectangular form narrower than the plant of the ship and cover with cupolas in the interior. There is an interesting pulpit with wrought steps. The altarpiece is of half-full of 18th century, made by a retablista of the region. One is made up of a bank with reliefs in the lateral streets, body of three separated streets by columns, and attic, where it is the image of Asunción.
- Nuestra Señora del Soto Hermitage: virgin who has great devotion from the Average Age. She was remodelated at the end of 17th century or principles of 18th century. It has a single body and flat testero. It has a dressing room behind his altarpiece, to which it is acceded by one of the doors of the altarpiece. Still it has samples of miracles of the Virgin and votive offerings. Its greater altarpiece was made in 1762 by Miguel Martinez de Quintana, one of the best painters of altarpieces of Salamanca at that time. One is made up of an only body and a great attic communicated with the dressing room of the Virgin through a bay that has an image of Nuestra Señora del Soto carved at the end of the Romanesque one. Also another wood statue of the Virgin exists of which it is of the same time. This statue is the one that is moved in the procession. The hermitage is located approximately to average legua (about 5 kilometers) of the town in the direction of Piedrahíta, to the right of the N-110. According to the tradition taking to the virgin in a car of oxen towards Piedrahíta in one of the inclines the oxen burst and in that right place a small hermitage to border became of the highway that denominated the Santito.

== Celebrations ==
- Nuestra Señora de la Asunción (8 September): commemorates the pattern of the town. The faithfuls arrive until the hermitage at horse, dressed generally in the typical suit. In the table banzos are auctioned.
- Celebration of the Summer (June).
- Celebration of the Children (Sunday of August).
- Romería (Religious celebration) to clean the water sources (the first Thursday of August), historically comes from the fact the corregidor of the Duke of Alba with the intention of which the town did not lose the right to the water ordered by the Duke.
