= Puerto Castilla =

Puerto Castilla may refer to:

- Puerto Castilla, Honduras
- Puerto Castilla, Spain
