= El Tejado =

- Municipality
- Coat of arms

- Location in Salamanca

- Location in Spain
- Coordinates: 40°26′32″N 5°31′21″W
- Country: Spain
- Autonomous community: Castile and León
- Province: Salamanca
- Comarca: Comarca de Guijuelo
- Subcomarca: Alto Tormes

Government
  - Mayor: José Luis Gutiérrez (People's Party)

Area
  - Total: 21 km^{2} (8.1 sq mi)
- Elevation: 985 m (3,232 ft)

Population (2025-01-01)
  - Total: 83
  - Density: 4.0/km^{2} (10/sq mi)
- Time zone: UTC+1 (CET)
  - Summer (DST): UTC+2 (CEST)

El Tejado is a municipality located in the province of Salamanca, Castile and León, Spain. As of 2016 the municipality has a population of 120 inhabitants.
