= Guijo de Ávila =

- Municipality
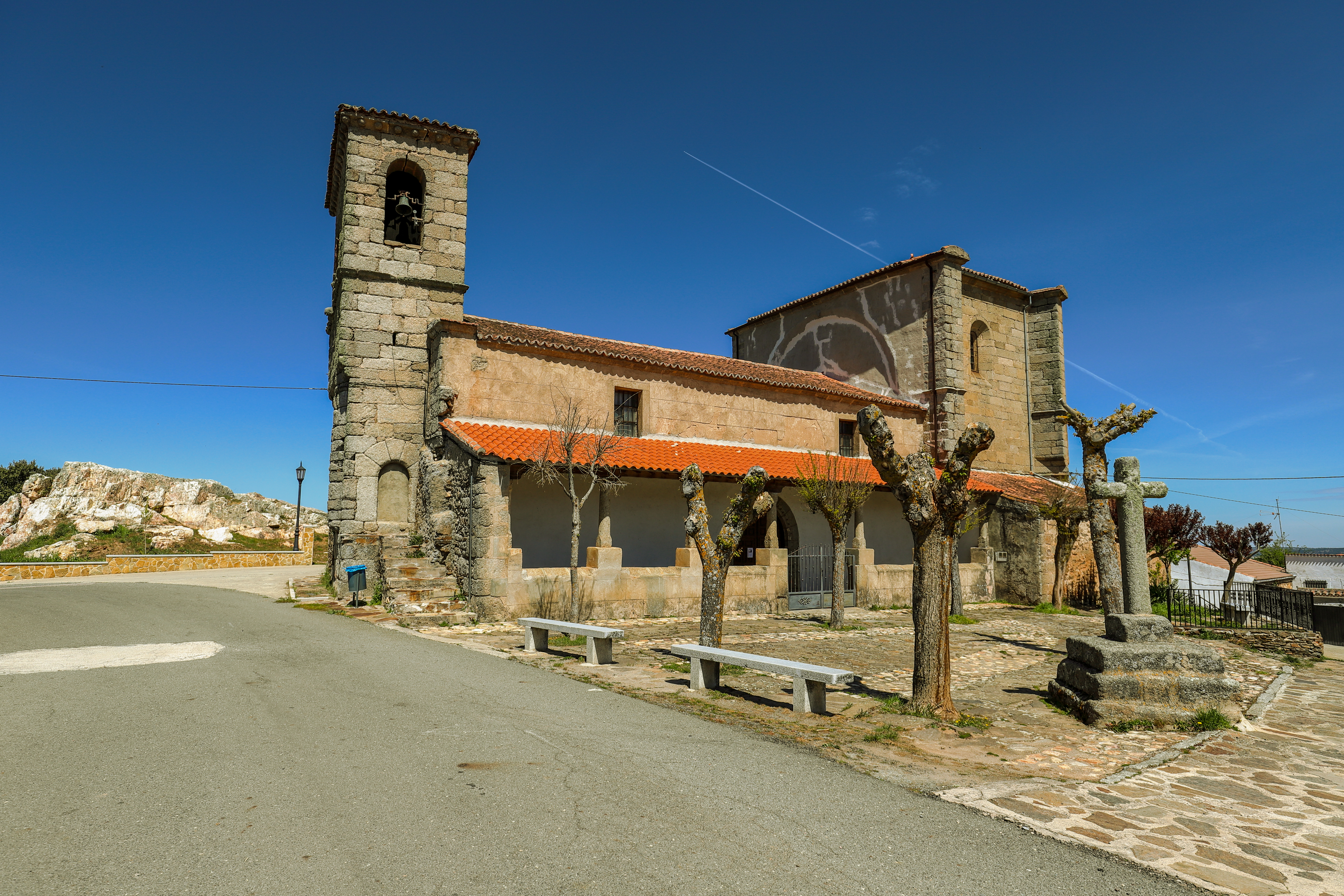
- Church of Santiago Apostol in Guijo de Ávila

- Coat of arms

- Location in Salamanca
- Coordinates: 40°31′54″N 5°38′24″W
- Country: Spain
- Autonomous community: Castile and León
- Province: Salamanca
- Comarca: Comarca de Guijuelo
- Subcomarca: Alto Tormes

Government
  - Mayor: Carmen María Briz Sánchez (PSOE)

Area
  - Total: 13 km^{2} (5.0 sq mi)
- Elevation: 975 m (3,199 ft)

Population (2025-01-01)
  - Total: 81
  - Density: 6.2/km^{2} (16/sq mi)
- Time zone: UTC+1 (CET)
  - Summer (DST): UTC+2 (CEST)
- Postal code: 37774

Guijo de Ávila is a municipality located in the province of Salamanca, Castile and León, Spain. According to the 2025 census (INE), the municipality has a population of 81 inhabitants.
