= Gallegos de Solmirón =

- Municipality
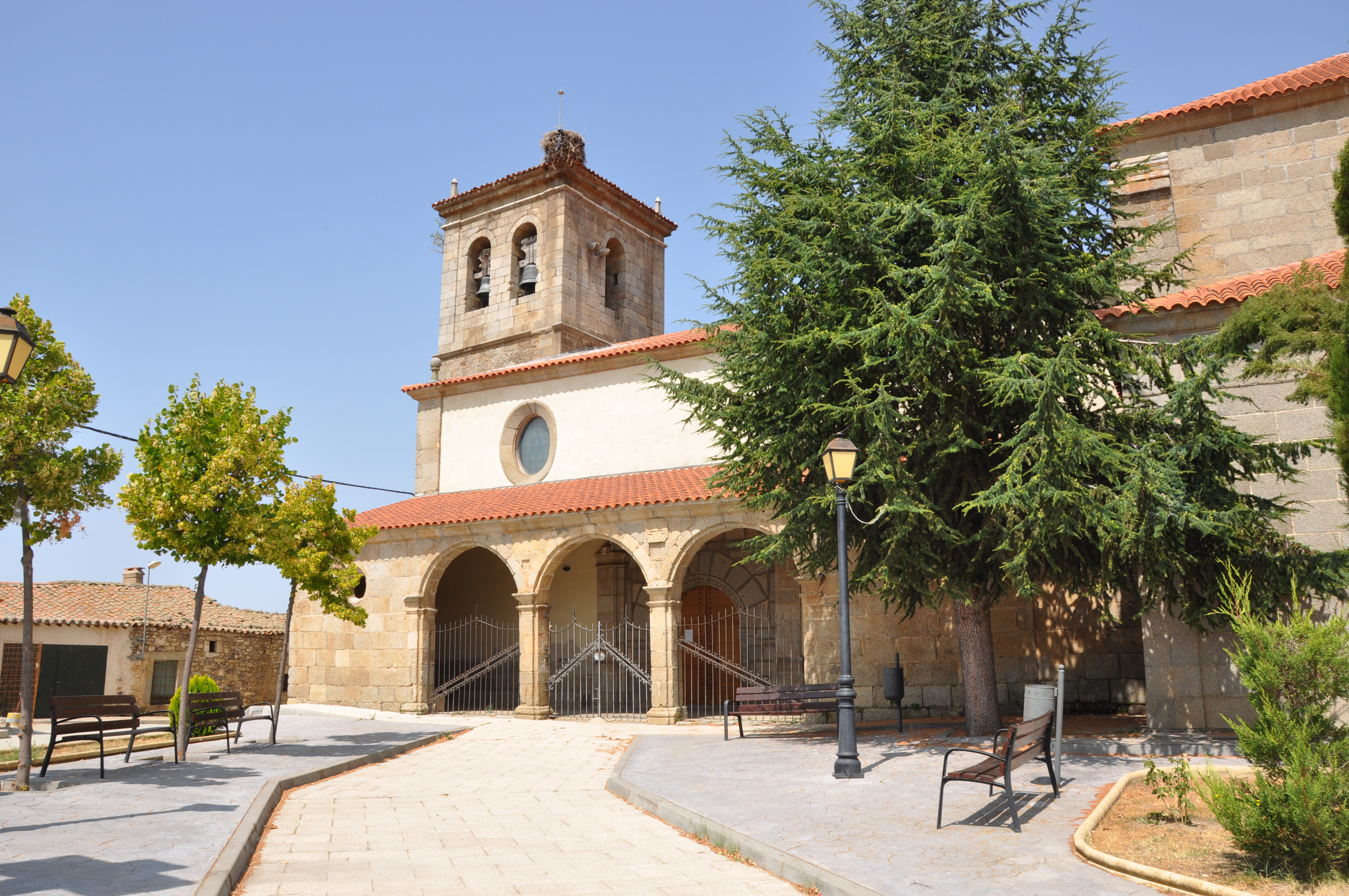
- Parish Church of San Juan Bautista in Gallegos de Solmirón

- Flag Coat of arms

- Location in Salamanca
- Coordinates: 40°32′12″N 5°26′52″W
- Country: Spain
- Autonomous community: Castile and León
- Province: Salamanca
- Comarca: Comarca de Guijuelo
- Subcomarca: Alto Tormes

Government
  - Mayor: Leonardo Herrera Sánchez (People's Party)

Area
  - Total: 31 km^{2} (12 sq mi)
- Elevation: 1,107 m (3,632 ft)

Population (2025-01-01)
  - Total: 109
  - Density: 3.5/km^{2} (9.1/sq mi)
- Time zone: UTC+1 (CET)
  - Summer (DST): UTC+2 (CEST)
- Postal code: 37751

Gallegos de Solmirón is a mountainous village and municipality in the province of Salamanca, western Spain, part of the autonomous community of Castile-Leon. It is located 60 kilometres (37 mi) from the provincial capital city of Salamanca and has a population of 131 people.

== Geography ==
The municipality covers an area of 31 km^{2} (12 sq mi). It lies 1,107 metres (3,632 ft) above sea level and the postal code is 37751.

== Economy ==
- The basis of the economy is agriculture.

== See also ==
- List of municipalities in Salamanca
