= La Tala =

- Municipality
- Location in Salamanca
- Coordinates: 40°35′23″N 5°32′15″W
- Country: Spain
- Autonomous community: Castile and León
- Province: Salamanca
- Comarca: Comarca de Guijuelo
- Subcomarca: Alto Tormes

Government
  - Mayor: Gabriel Garrudo Sánchez (People's Party)

Area
  - Total: 12 km^{2} (4.6 sq mi)
- Elevation: 925 m (3,035 ft)

Population (2025-01-01)
  - Total: 77
  - Density: 6.4/km^{2} (17/sq mi)
- Time zone: UTC+1 (CET)
  - Summer (DST): UTC+2 (CEST)
- Postal code: 37752

La Tala is a municipality located in the province of Salamanca, Castile and León, Spain. As of 2016 the municipality has a population of 96 inhabitants.
