= Becedas =

- municipality
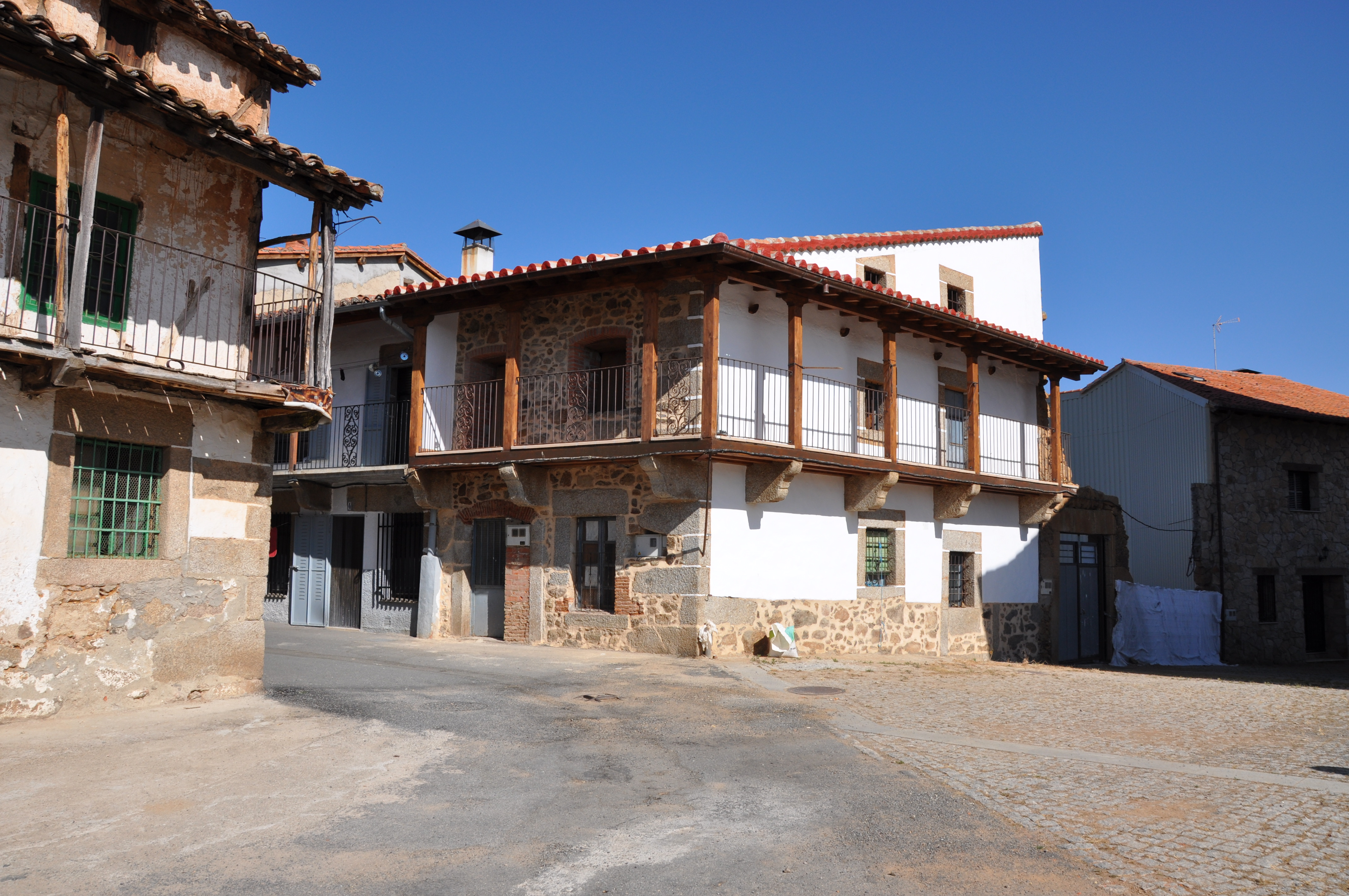
- Traditional houses in Becedas, Ávila

- Flag Coat of arms

- Extension of the municipal term within the province of Ávila

- Location in Spain. Becedas (Spain)
- Coordinates: 40°24′18″N 5°38′05″W
- Country: Spain
- Autonomous community: Castile and León
- Province: Ávila
- Municipality: Becedas

Area
  - Total: 32.2 km^{2} (12.4 sq mi)
- Elevation: 1,130 m (3,710 ft)

Population (2025-01-01)
  - Total: 146
  - Density: 4.53/km^{2} (11.7/sq mi)
- Time zone: UTC+1 (CET)
  - Summer (DST): UTC+2 (CEST)
- Website: Official website

Becedas is a municipality located in the province of Ávila, Castile and León, Spain. It belongs to the Alto Tormes region. According to the 2025 census (INE), the municipality had a population of 146 inhabitants.

== Toponym ==
The name derives from biezo, a regional word meaning "birch tree"., which is supported by the abundance of peat bogs, heaths and birch trees (see the nearby town of Tremedal, whose name is commonly used to refer to bogs). However, Gómez Blázquez, scholar of the local lexicon and toponymy, makes a reference to the same word, biezo, with the same meaning, but without linking it to the town's name, for which he proposes other etymologies.

There are also other scholars who propose the Latin word vicia (vetch, in Spanish, vicia) as the origin for the term. Due to its traditional use as animal feed, the name might be derived from the Latin, vicieta, "place where vetch is found", or directly from the older form vicietu. In any case, the spelling with the letter B is not etymological and, as such, the term's etymology can be compared to La Vecilla (province of León) or Vecilla de Trasmonte (province of Zamora).

== Population ==
Historical population
Year	Pop.	±% p.a.
2023	164	—
2024	151	−7.93%
2025	146	−3.31%
Source: INE
