= Navamorales =

- Municipality
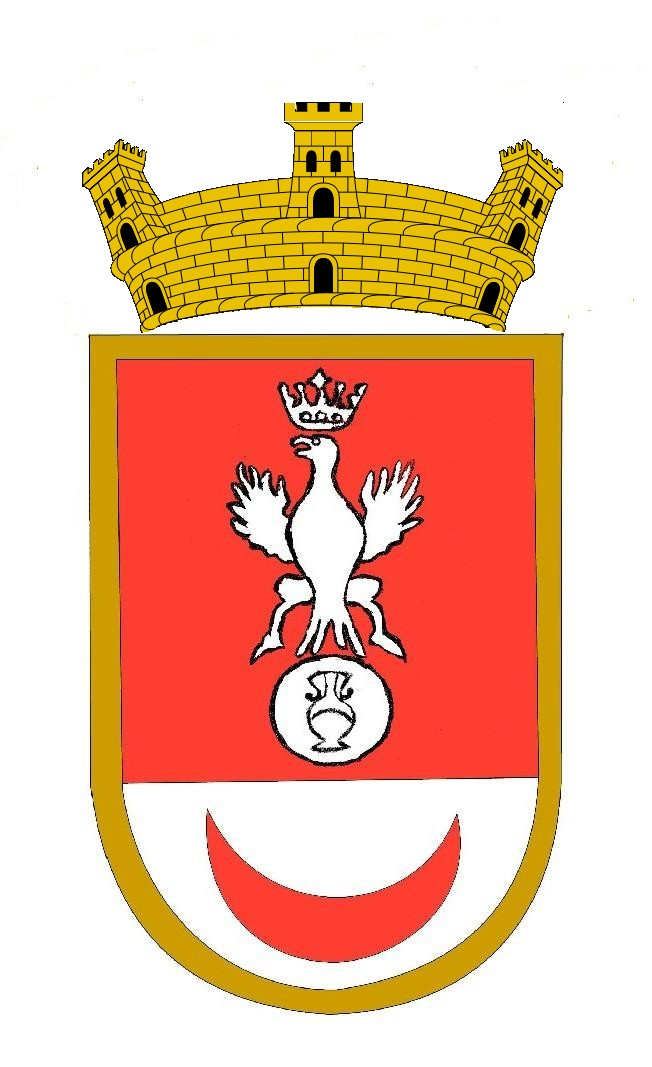
- Flag Coat of arms

- Location in Salamanca
- Coordinates: 40°28′34″N 5°28′34″W
- Country: Spain
- Autonomous community: Castile and León
- Province: Salamanca
- Comarca: Comarca de Guijuelo
- Subcomarca: Alto Tormes

Government
  - Mayor: Alberto Peña Peña (People's Party)

Area
  - Total: 18 km^{2} (6.9 sq mi)
- Elevation: 994 m (3,261 ft)

Population (2025-01-01)
  - Total: 45
  - Density: 2.5/km^{2} (6.5/sq mi)
- Time zone: UTC+1 (CET)
  - Summer (DST): UTC+2 (CEST)
- Postal code: 37749

Navamorales is a village and municipality in the province of Salamanca, western Spain, part of the autonomous community of Castile-Leon. It is located 71 kilometres (44 mi) from the provincial capital city of Salamanca and has a population of 142 people.

== Geography ==
The municipality covers an area of 18 km^{2} (6.9 sq mi). It lies 994 metres (3,261 ft) above sea level and the postal code is 37749.

== See also ==
- List of municipalities in Salamanca
