= Tormellas =

- municipality
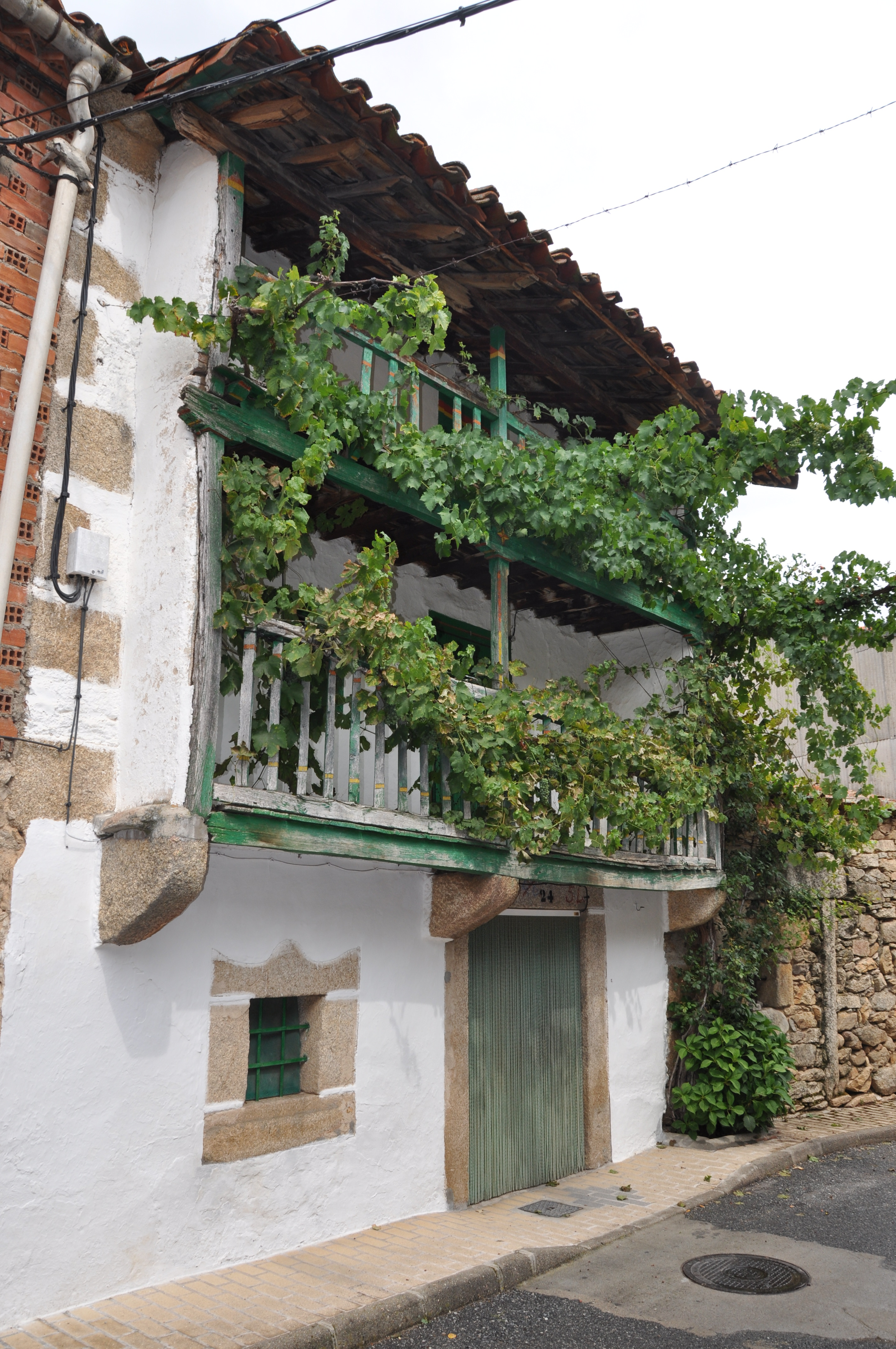
- Traditional house in Tormellas
- Flag Coat of arms
- Location in Spain. Tormellas (Spain)
- Coordinates: 40°18′15″N 5°30′42″W
- Country: Spain
- Autonomous community: Castile and León
- Province: Ávila
- Municipality: Tormellas

Government
  - Alcaldesa/Major: María del Carmen Carrera Blázquez

Area
  - Total: 9 km^{2} (3.5 sq mi)

Population (2025-01-01)
  - Total: 35
  - Density: 3.9/km^{2} (10/sq mi)
- Time zone: UTC+1 (CET)
  - Summer (DST): UTC+2 (CEST)
- Website: Official website

Tormellas is a municipality located in the province of Ávila, Castile and León, Spain.

== Population ==
Historical population
Year	Pop.	±% p.a.
2023	36	—
2024	35	−2.78%
2025	35	+0.00%
Source: INE
