= San Bartolomé de Béjar =

- municipality
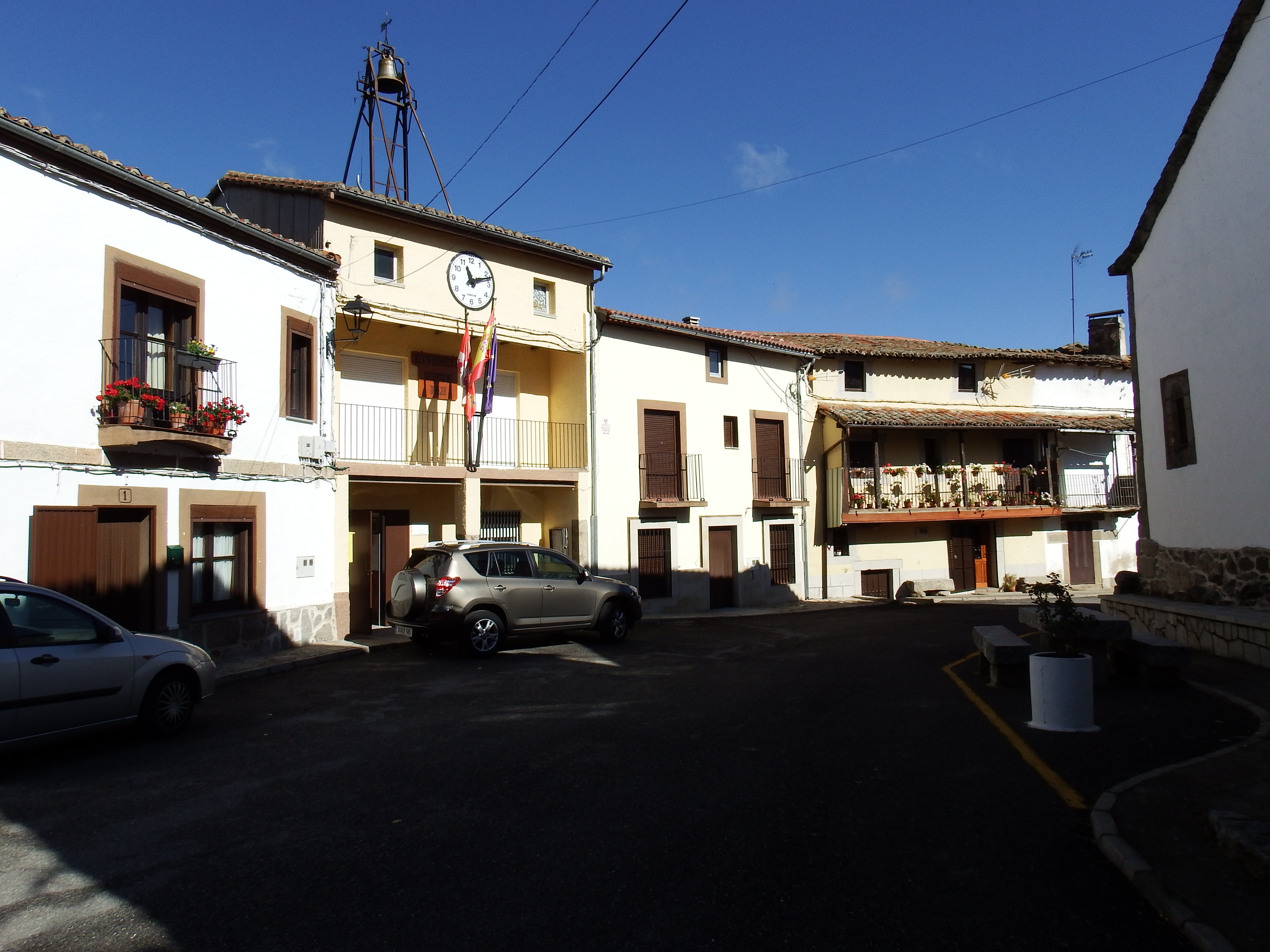
- Town hall
- Flag Coat of arms
- Location in Spain. San Bartolomé de Béjar (Spain)
- Coordinates: 40°24′29″N 5°39′47″W
- Country: Spain
- Autonomous community: Castile and León
- Province: Ávila
- Municipality: San Bartolomé de Béjar

Area
  - Total: 16 km^{2} (6.2 sq mi)

Population (2025-01-01)
  - Total: 44
  - Density: 2.8/km^{2} (7.1/sq mi)
- Time zone: UTC+1 (CET)
  - Summer (DST): UTC+2 (CEST)
- Website: Official website

San Bartolomé de Béjar is a municipality located in Castile and León, Spain.

== Population ==
Historical population
Year	Pop.	±% p.a.
2023	54	—
2024	49	−9.26%
2025	44	−10.20%
Source: INE
