= Santiago del Tormes =

- municipality
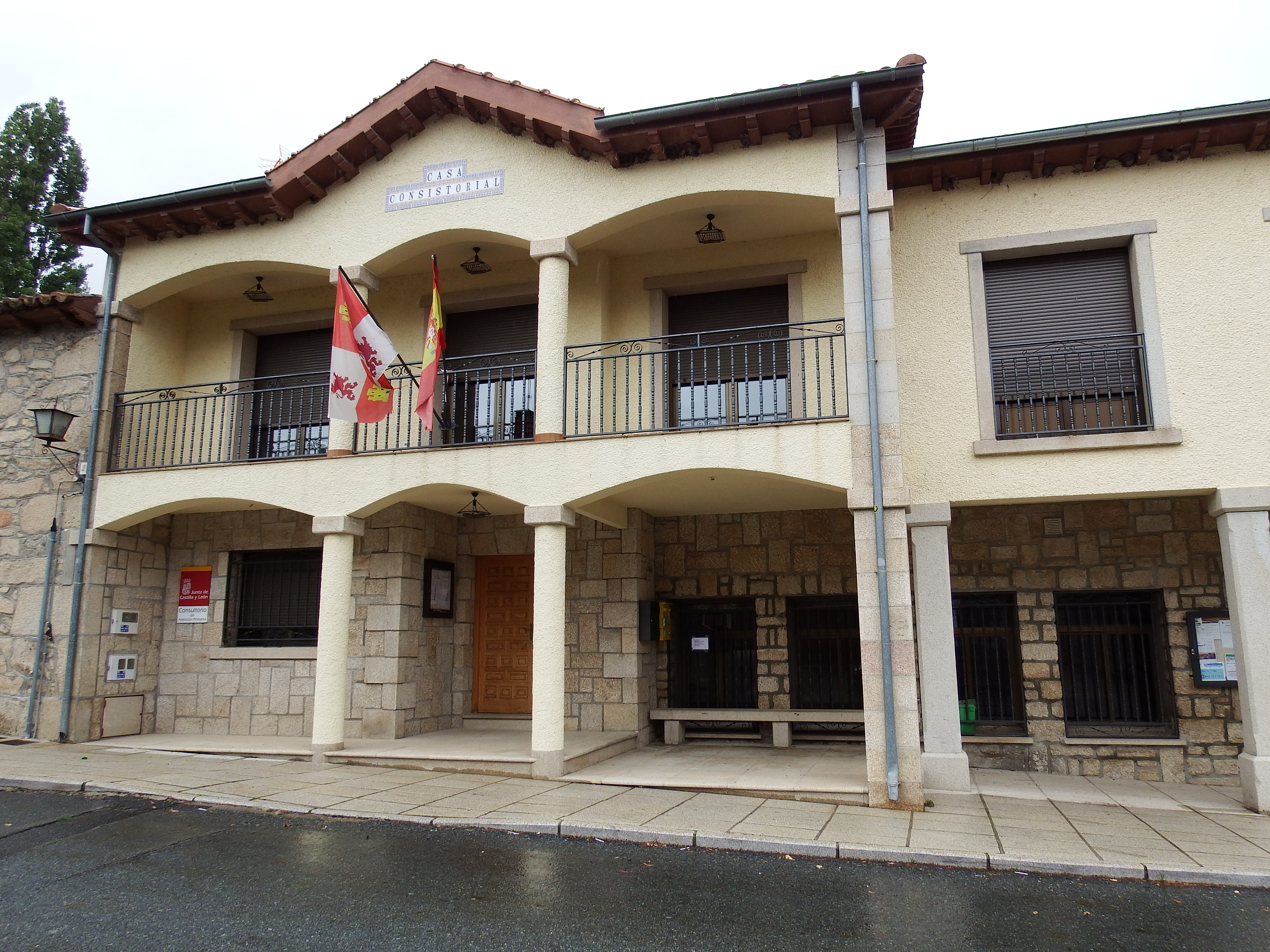
- Town hall

- Location in Spain. Santiago del Tormes (Spain)
- Coordinates: 40°20′44″N 5°22′48″W
- Country: Spain
- Autonomous community: Castile and León
- Province: Ávila
- Municipality: Santiago del Tormes

Area
  - Total: 68 km^{2} (26 sq mi)

Population (2025-01-01)
  - Total: 104
  - Density: 1.5/km^{2} (4.0/sq mi)
- Time zone: UTC+1 (CET)
  - Summer (DST): UTC+2 (CEST)
- Website: Official website

Santiago del Tormes is a municipality located in the province of Ávila, Castile and León, Spain.

== Population ==
Historical population
Year	Pop.	±% p.a.
2023	110	—
2024	107	−2.73%
2025	104	−2.80%
Source: INE
