= El Losar del Barco =

- Municipality
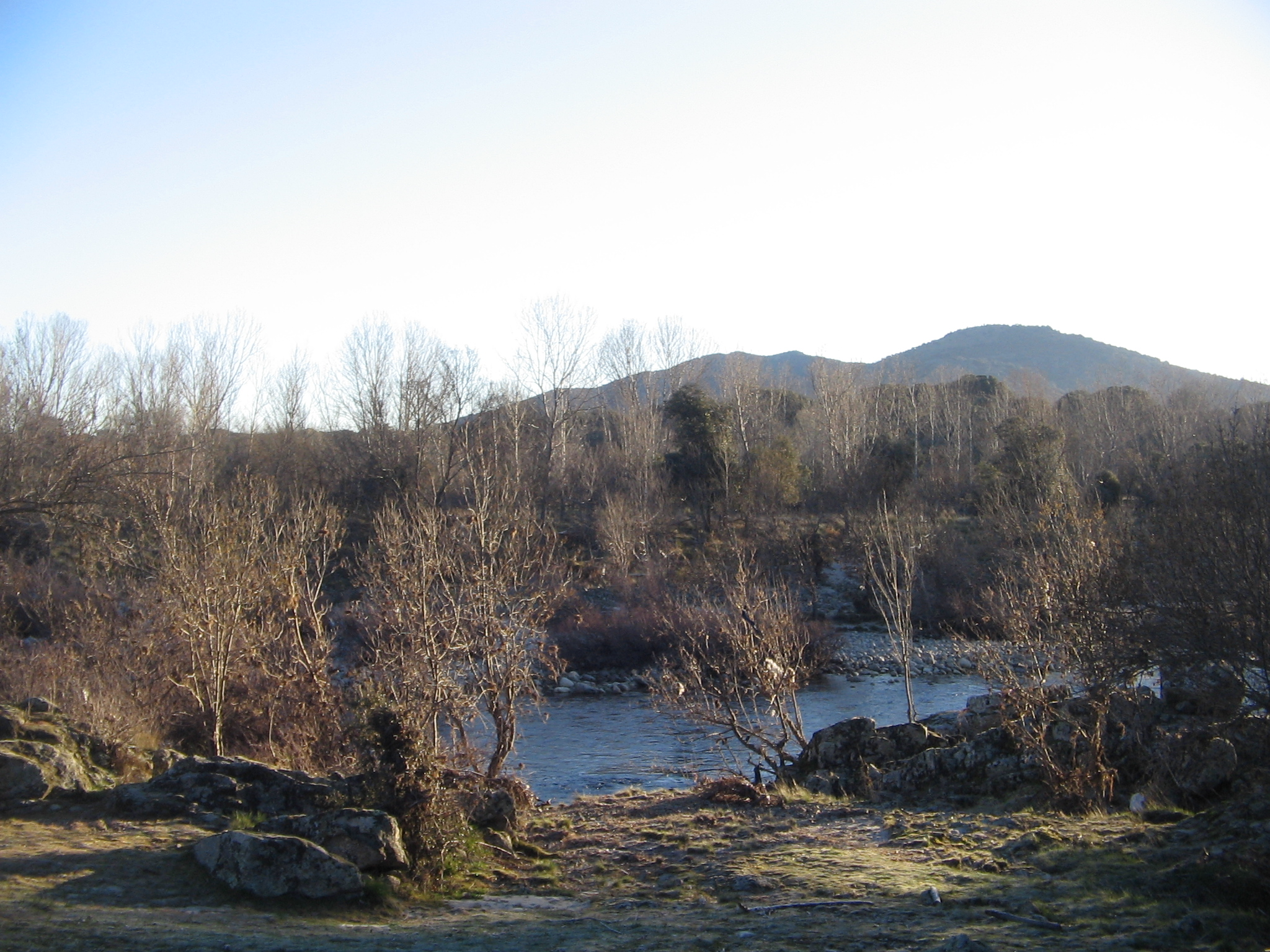
- Flag Coat of arms
- Location in Spain. El Losar del Barco (Spain)
- Coordinates: 40°23′33″N 5°32′22″W
- Country: Spain
- Autonomous community: Castile and León
- Province: Ávila
- Municipality: El Losar del Barco

Area
  - Total: 19.54 km^{2} (7.54 sq mi)
- Elevation: 1,012 m (3,320 ft)

Population (2025-01-01)
  - Total: 99
  - Density: 5.1/km^{2} (13/sq mi)
- Time zone: UTC+1 (CET)
  - Summer (DST): UTC+2 (CEST)
- Website: Official website

El Losar del Barco is a municipality located in the province of Ávila, Castile and León, Spain.

== Population ==
Historical population
Year	Pop.	±% p.a.
2023	116	—
2024	103	−11.21%
2025	99	−3.88%
Source: INE
