= Neila de San Miguel =

- municipality
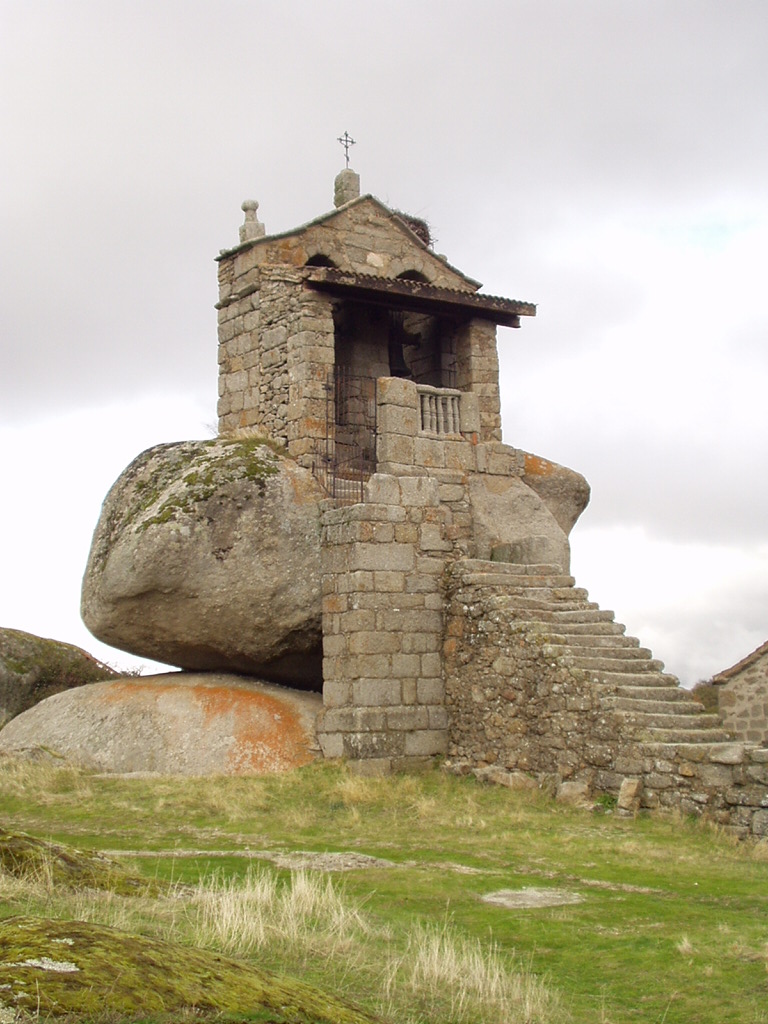
- Church tower in Neila de San Miguel, municipality of Avila, Spain.

- Coat of arms

- Location in Spain. Neila de San Miguel (Spain)
- Coordinates: 40°25′24″N 5°39′03″W
- Country: Spain
- Autonomous community: Castile and León
- Province: Ávila

Area
  - Total: 7 km^{2} (2.7 sq mi)

Population (2025-01-01)
  - Total: 66
  - Density: 9.4/km^{2} (24/sq mi)
- Time zone: UTC+1 (CET)
  - Summer (DST): UTC+2 (CEST)
- Website: Official website

Neila de San Miguel is a municipality located in the province of Ávila, Castile and León, Spain.

== Population ==
Historical population
Year	Pop.	±% p.a.
2023	62	—
2024	62	+0.00%
2025	66	+6.45%
Source: INE
