= Navalonguilla =

- municipality
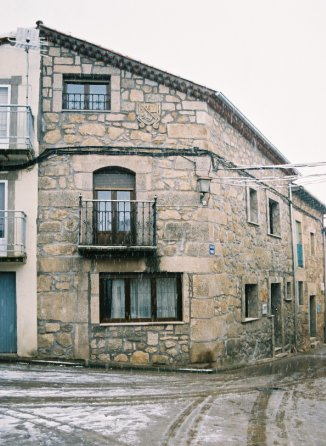
- Flag Coat of arms
- Location in Spain. Navalonguilla (Spain)
- Coordinates: 40°16′42″N 5°30′07″W
- Country: Spain
- Autonomous community: Castile and León
- Province: Ávila
- Municipality: Navalonguilla

Area
  - Total: 90 km^{2} (35 sq mi)

Population (2025-01-01)
  - Total: 182
  - Density: 2.0/km^{2} (5.2/sq mi)
- Time zone: UTC+1 (CET)
  - Summer (DST): UTC+2 (CEST)
- Website: Official website

Navalonguilla is a municipality located in the province of Ávila, Castile and León, Spain.

== Population ==
Historical population
Year	Pop.	±% p.a.
2023	194	—
2024	185	−4.64%
2025	182	−1.62%
Source: INE
