= Aldeanueva de Santa Cruz =

- municipality
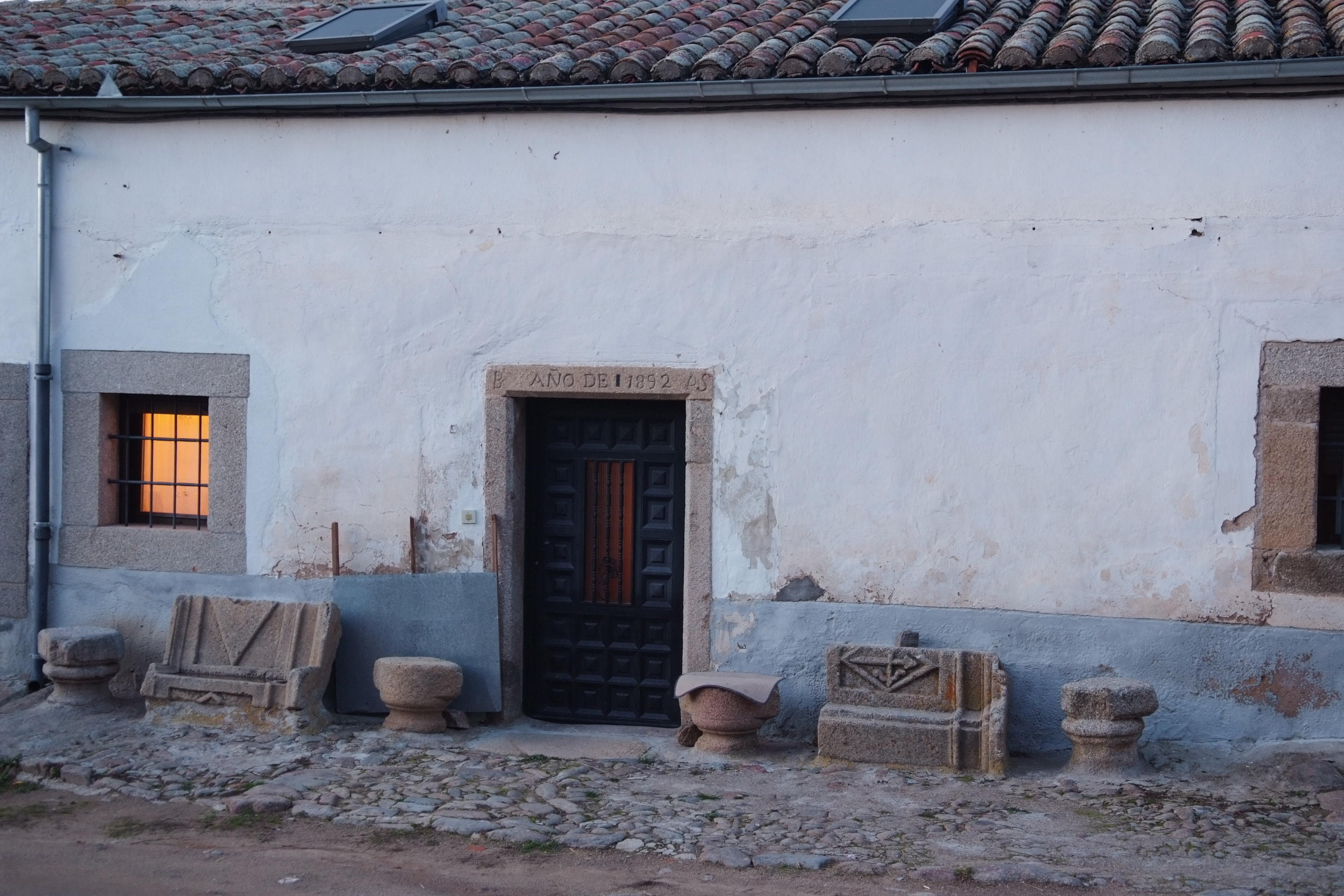
- House remains of the old convent in Aldeanueva de Santa Cruz, (Ávila), Spain.

- Flag Coat of arms

- Location in Spain. Aldeanueva de Santa Cruz (Spain)
- Coordinates: 40°22′54″N 5°25′10″W
- Country: Spain
- Autonomous community: Castile and León
- Province: Ávila

Area
  - Total: 8.48 km^{2} (3.27 sq mi)
- Elevation: 1,162 m (3,812 ft)

Population (2025-01-01)
  - Total: 100
  - Density: 12/km^{2} (31/sq mi)
- Time zone: UTC+1 (CET)
  - Summer (DST): UTC+2 (CEST)
- Website: Official website

Aldeanueva de Santa Cruz is a municipality located in the province of Ávila, Castile and León, Spain. According to the 2025 census (INE), the municipality has a population of 100 inhabitants.

== Population ==
Historical population
Year	Pop.	±% p.a.
2023	100	—
2024	102	+2.00%
2025	100	−1.96%
Source: INE
