= Navatejares =

- municipality
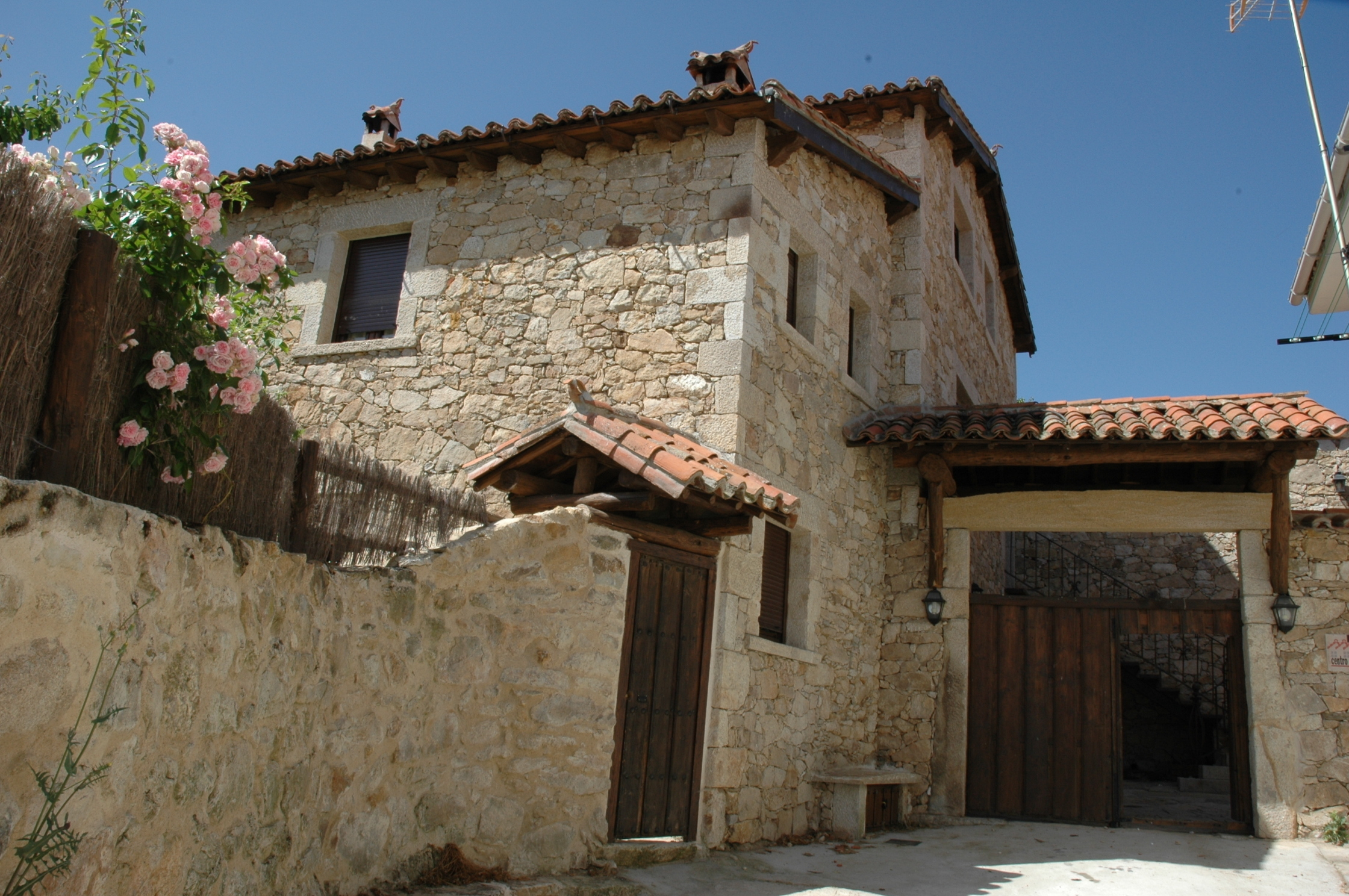

- Flag Coat of arms

- Location in Spain. Navatejares (Spain)
- Coordinates: 40°20′08″N 5°31′51″W
- Country: Spain
- Autonomous community: Castile and León
- Province: Ávila
- Municipality: Navatejares

Area
  - Total: 11 km^{2} (4.2 sq mi)

Population (2025-01-01)
  - Total: 48
  - Density: 4.4/km^{2} (11/sq mi)
- Time zone: UTC+1 (CET)
  - Summer (DST): UTC+2 (CEST)
- Website: Official website

Navatejares is a municipality located in the province of Ávila, Castile and León, Spain.

== Population ==
Historical population
| Year | Pop. | ±% p.a. |
|---|---|---|
| 2023 | 55 | — |
| 2024 | 50 | −9.09% |
| 2025 | 48 | −4.00% |
Source: INE
