= El Torno =

El Torno, Spain
- municipality
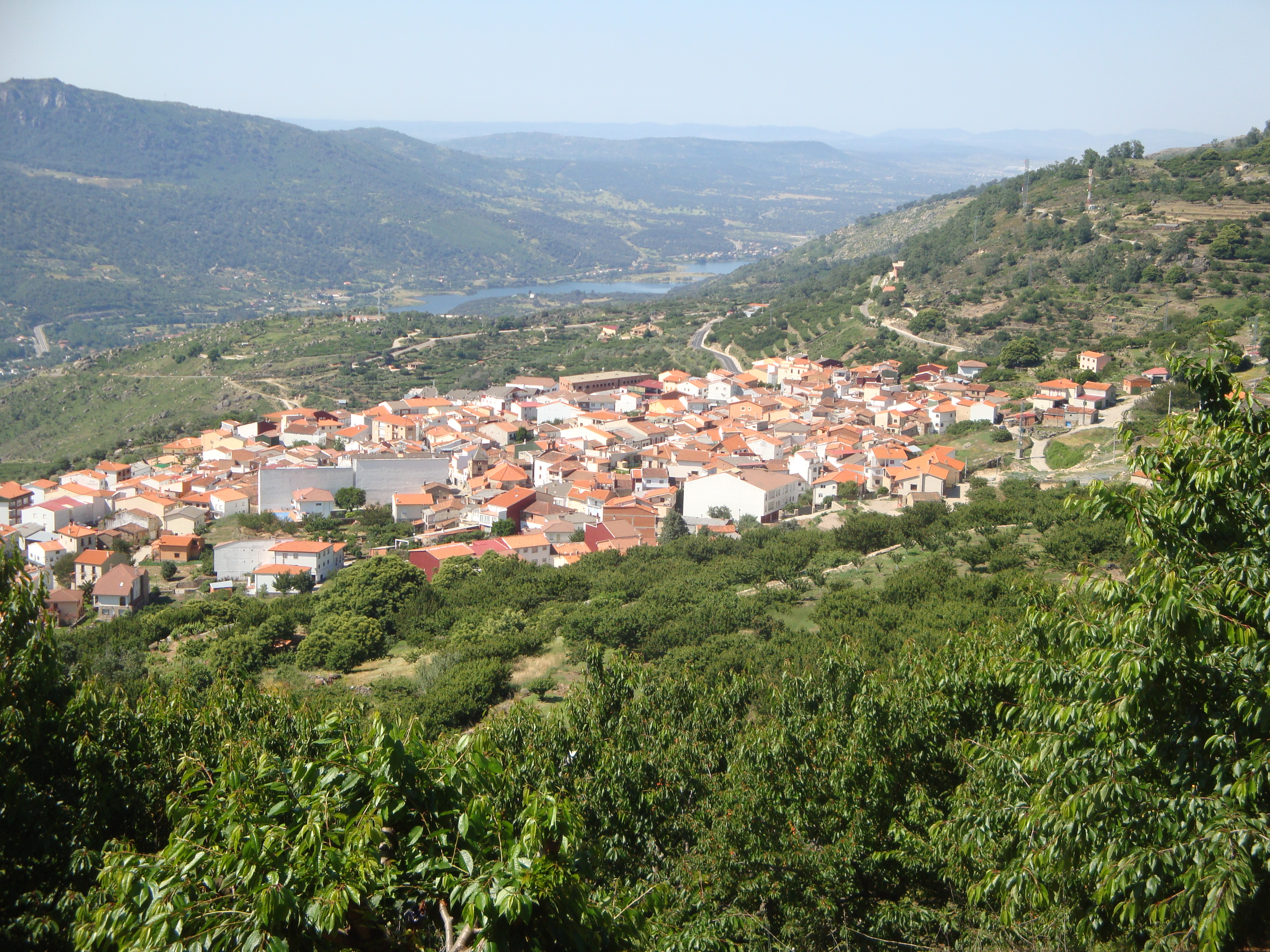

- Flag Coat of arms
- Interactive map of El Torno, Spain
- Coordinates: 40°05′N 5°51′W
- Country: Spain
- Autonomous community: Extremadura
- Province: Cáceres
- Municipality: El Torno

Area
  - Total: 22 km^{2} (8.5 sq mi)
- Elevation: 769 m (2,523 ft)

Population (2025-01-01)
  - Total: 805
  - Density: 37/km^{2} (95/sq mi)
- Time zone: UTC+1 (CET)
  - Summer (DST): UTC+2 (CEST)

El Torno is a municipality located in the province of Cáceres, Extremadura, Spain. According to the 2005 census (INE), the municipality has a population of 938 inhabitants.

El Torno is a small village at the west of Spain. It is a mountains village, and has a river named Jerte. The village is at 900 m altitude. The main monument is an old church. It is an agriculture village, and its main fruit is the cherry. It is rainy and has much forest. The more important holiday is San Lucas on 18 October, and also the Carnival is very important.

== See also ==
- List of municipalities in Cáceres
