= Los Llanos de Tormes =

- municipality
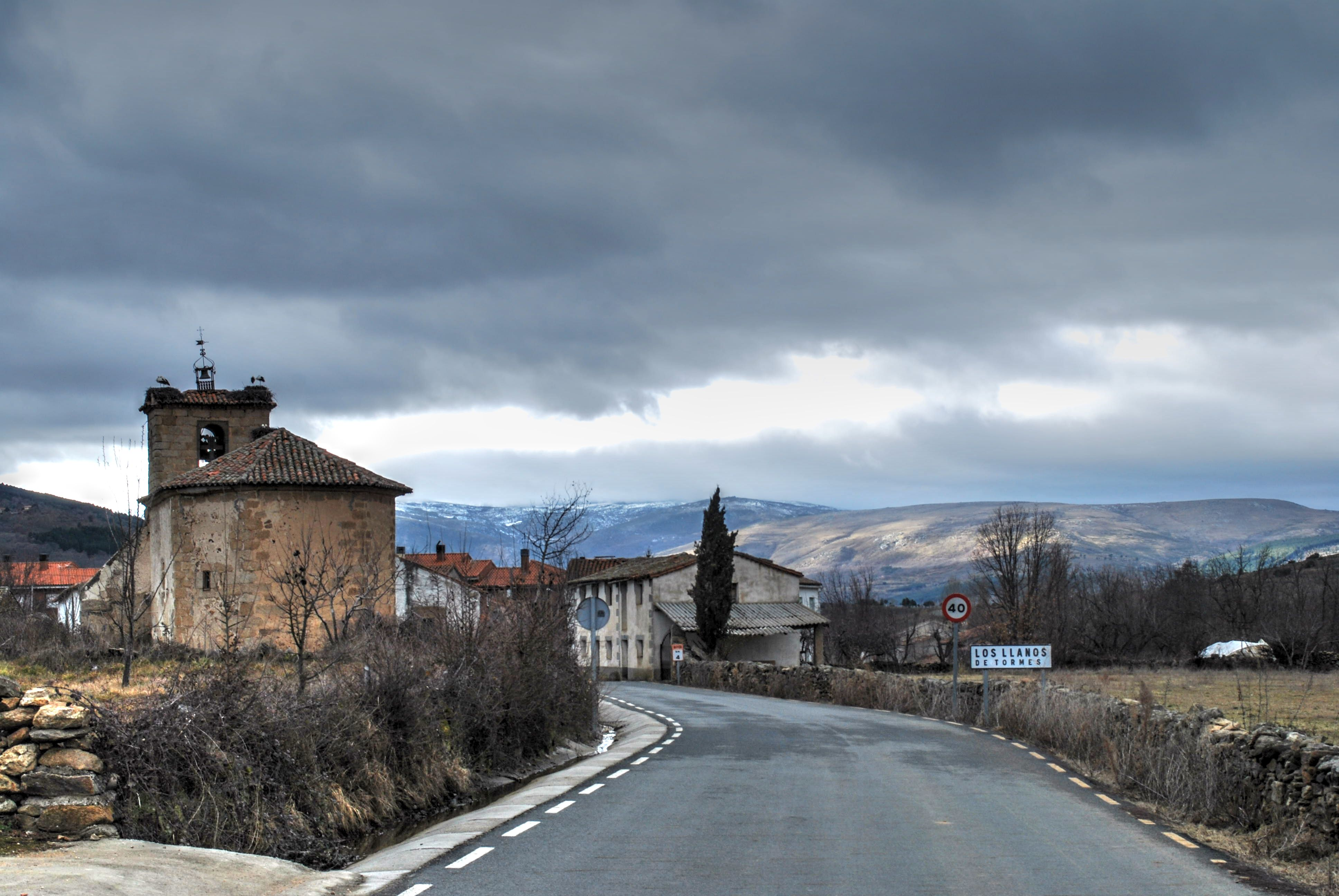
- Entrance of Los llanos de Tormes

- Flag Coat of arms

- Location in Spain. Los Llanos de Tormes (Castile and León)
- Coordinates: 40°19′41″N 5°30′01″W
- Country: Spain
- Autonomous community: Castile and León
- Province: Ávila
- Municipality: Los Llanos de Tormes

Area
  - Total: 17 km^{2} (6.6 sq mi)

Population (2025-01-01)
  - Total: 57
  - Density: 3.4/km^{2} (8.7/sq mi)
- Time zone: UTC+1 (CET)
  - Summer (DST): UTC+2 (CEST)
- Website: Official website

Los Llanos de Tormes is a municipality located in the province of Ávila, Castile and León, Spain.

== Population ==
Historical population
Year	Pop.	±% p.a.
2023	65	—
2024	63	−3.08%
2025	57	−9.52%
Source: INE
