= Gilbuena =

- Municipality
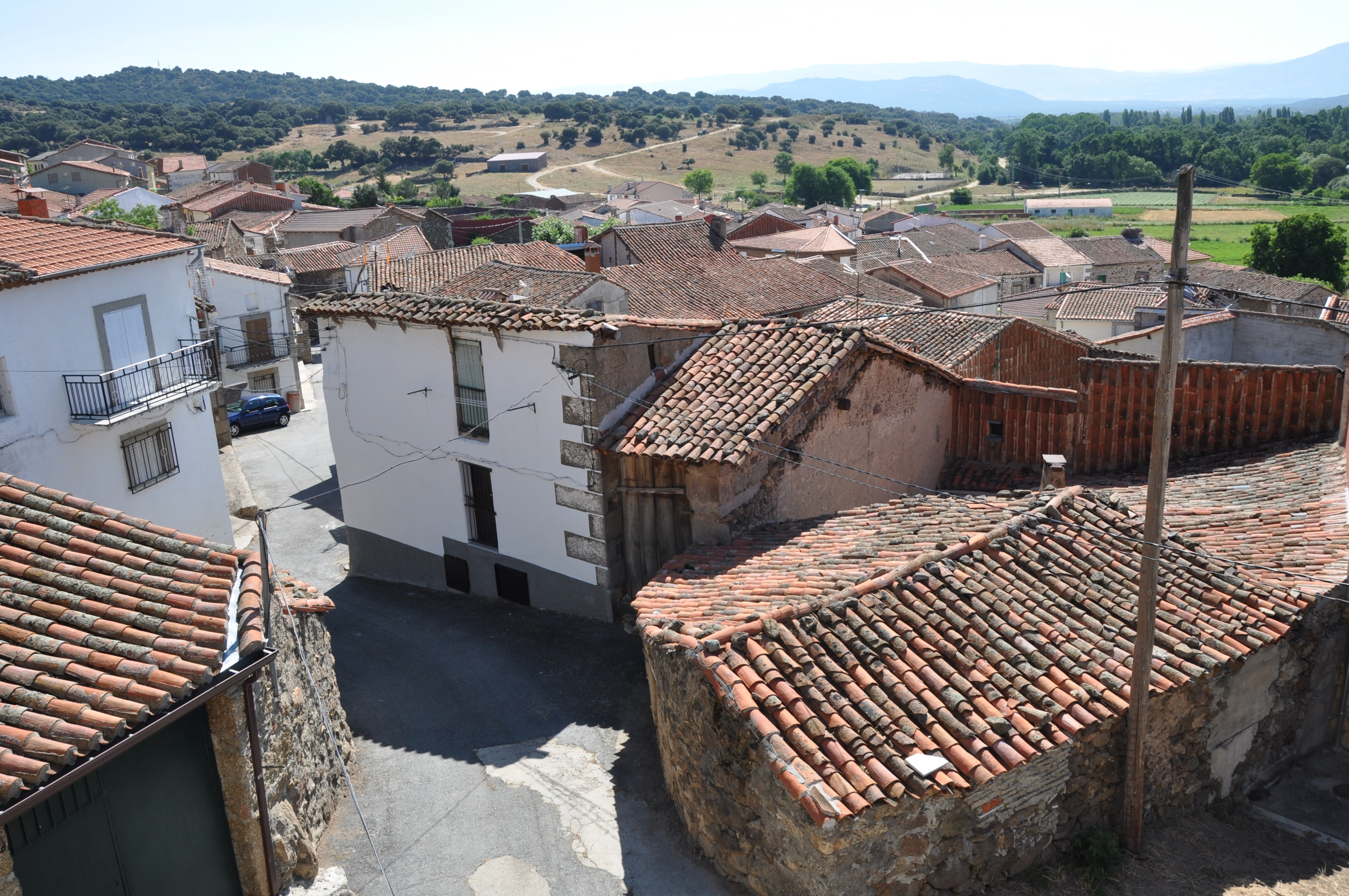
- Panorama

- Location in Spain. Gilbuena (Spain)
- Coordinates: 40°24′55″N 5°36′19″W
- Country: Spain
- Autonomous community: Castile and León
- Province: Ávila
- Municipality: Gilbuena

Area
  - Total: 15 km^{2} (5.8 sq mi)

Population (2025-01-01)
  - Total: 45
  - Density: 3.0/km^{2} (7.8/sq mi)
- Time zone: UTC+1 (CET)
  - Summer (DST): UTC+2 (CEST)
- Website: Official website

Gilbuena is a municipality located in the province of Ávila, Castile and León, Spain.

== Population ==
Historical population
Year	Pop.	±% p.a.
2023	49	—
2024	47	−4.08%
2025	45	−4.26%
Source: INE
