= Umbrías =

- municipality
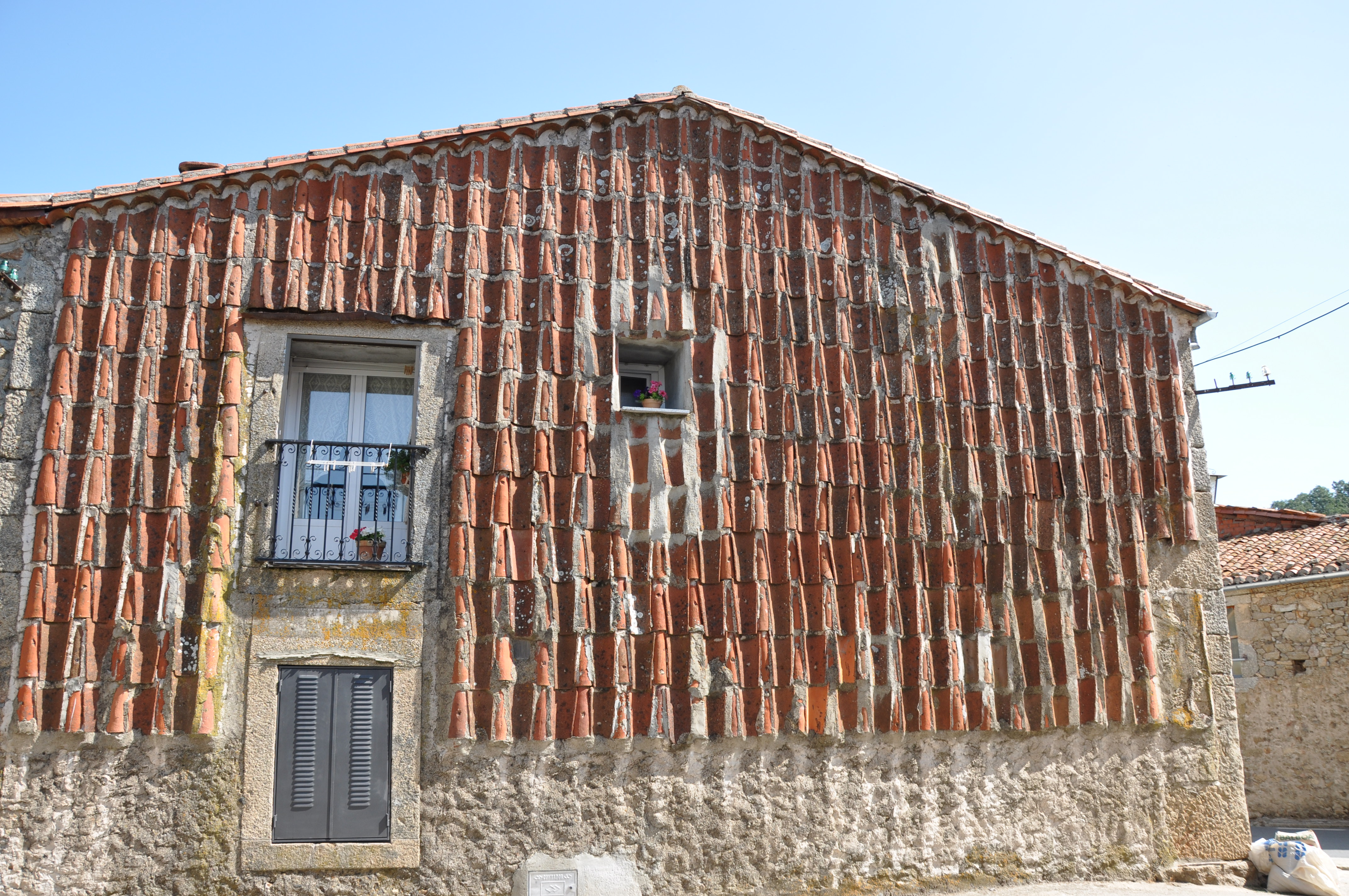
- Traditional houses in Umbrías

- Location in Spain. Umbrías (Spain)
- Coordinates: 40°18′47″N 5°34′41″W
- Country: Spain
- Autonomous community: Castile and León
- Province: Ávila
- Municipality: Umbrías

Area
  - Total: 11 km^{2} (4.2 sq mi)

Population (2025-01-01)
  - Total: 100
  - Density: 9.1/km^{2} (24/sq mi)
- Time zone: UTC+1 (CET)
  - Summer (DST): UTC+2 (CEST)
- Website: Official website

Umbrías is a municipality located in the province of Ávila, Castile and León, Spain.

== Population ==
Historical population
Year	Pop.	±% p.a.
2023	103	—
2024	100	−2.91%
2025	100	+0.00%
Source: INE
