= Junciana =

- municipality
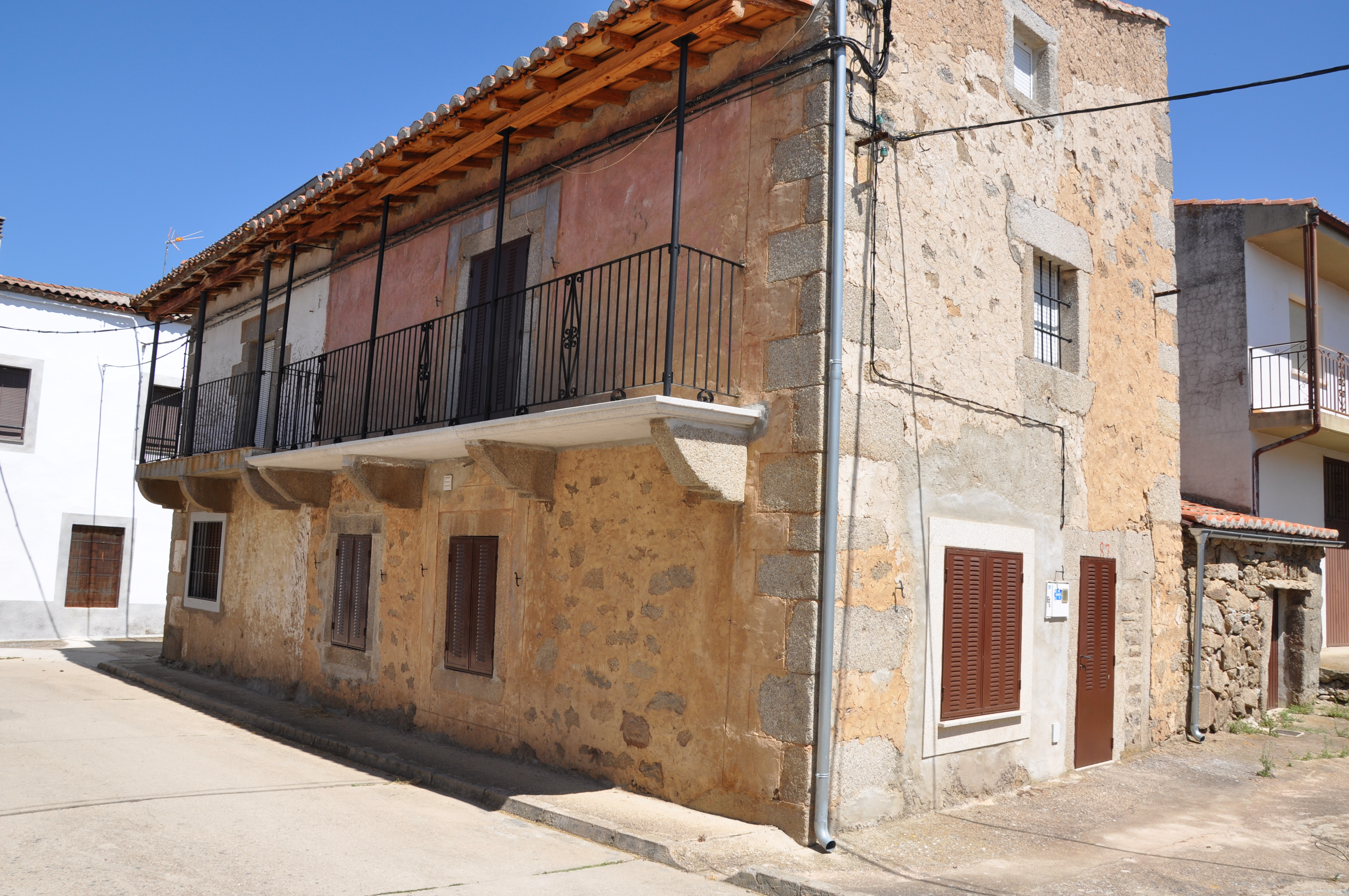
- Traditional houses in Junciana
- Flag Coat of arms
- Location in Spain. Junciana (Castile and León)
- Coordinates: 40°24′36″N 5°33′28″W
- Country: Spain
- Autonomous community: Castile and León
- Province: Ávila
- Municipality: Junciana

Area
  - Total: 15 km^{2} (5.8 sq mi)

Population (2025-01-01)
  - Total: 40
  - Density: 2.7/km^{2} (6.9/sq mi)
- Time zone: UTC+1 (CET)
  - Summer (DST): UTC+2 (CEST)
- Website: Official website

Junciana is a municipality located in the province of Ávila, Castile and León, Spain.

== Population ==
Historical population
Year	Pop.	±% p.a.
2023	43	—
2024	40	−6.98%
2025	40	+0.00%
Source: INE
