= Bohoyo =

- municipality
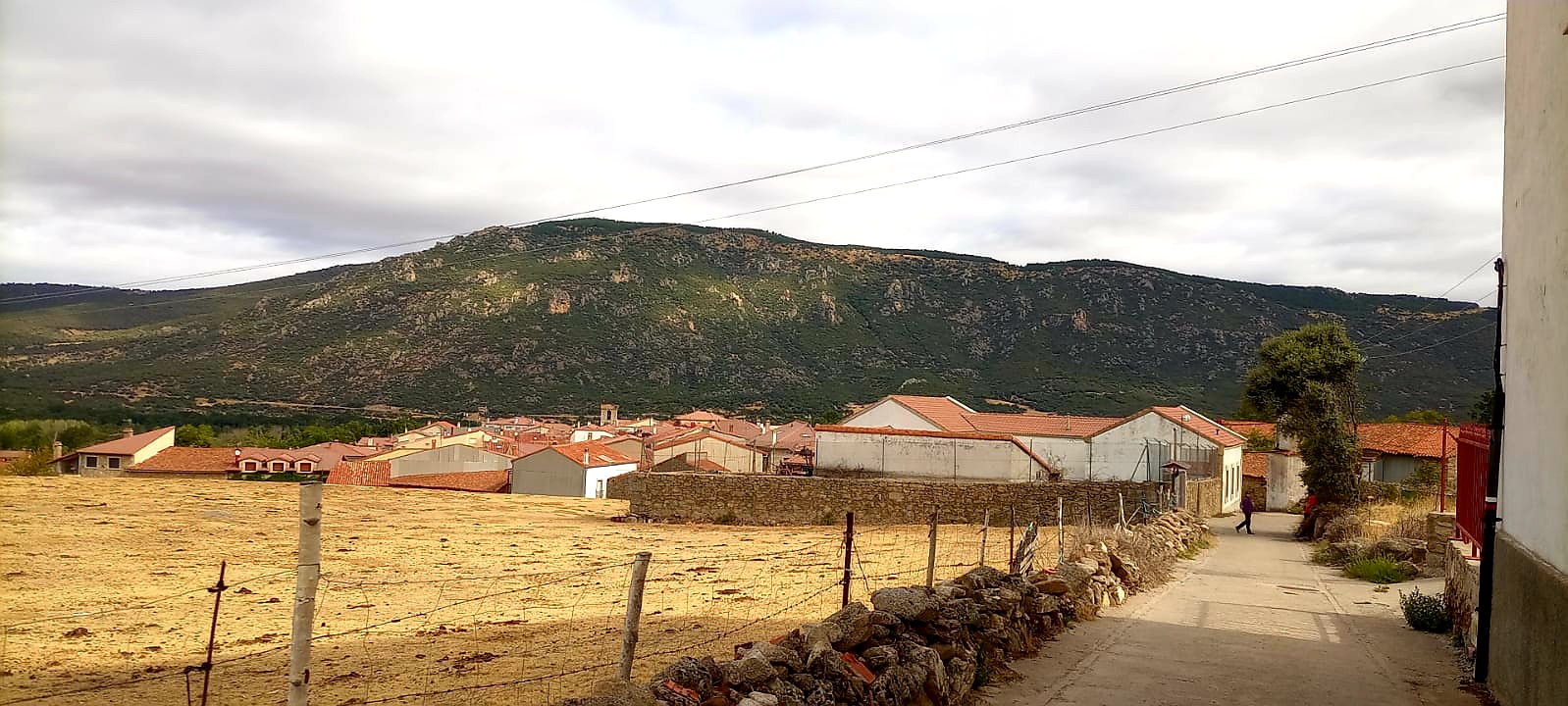

- Flag Coat of arms

- Location in Spain. Bohoyo (Spain)
- Coordinates: 40°18′54″N 5°26′28″W
- Country: Spain
- Autonomous community: Castile and León
- Province: Ávila

Area
  - Total: 73.87 km^{2} (28.52 sq mi)
- Elevation: 1,139 m (3,737 ft)

Population (2025-01-01)
  - Total: 205
  - Density: 2.78/km^{2} (7.19/sq mi)
- Time zone: UTC+1 (CET)
  - Summer (DST): UTC+2 (CEST)
- Website: Official website

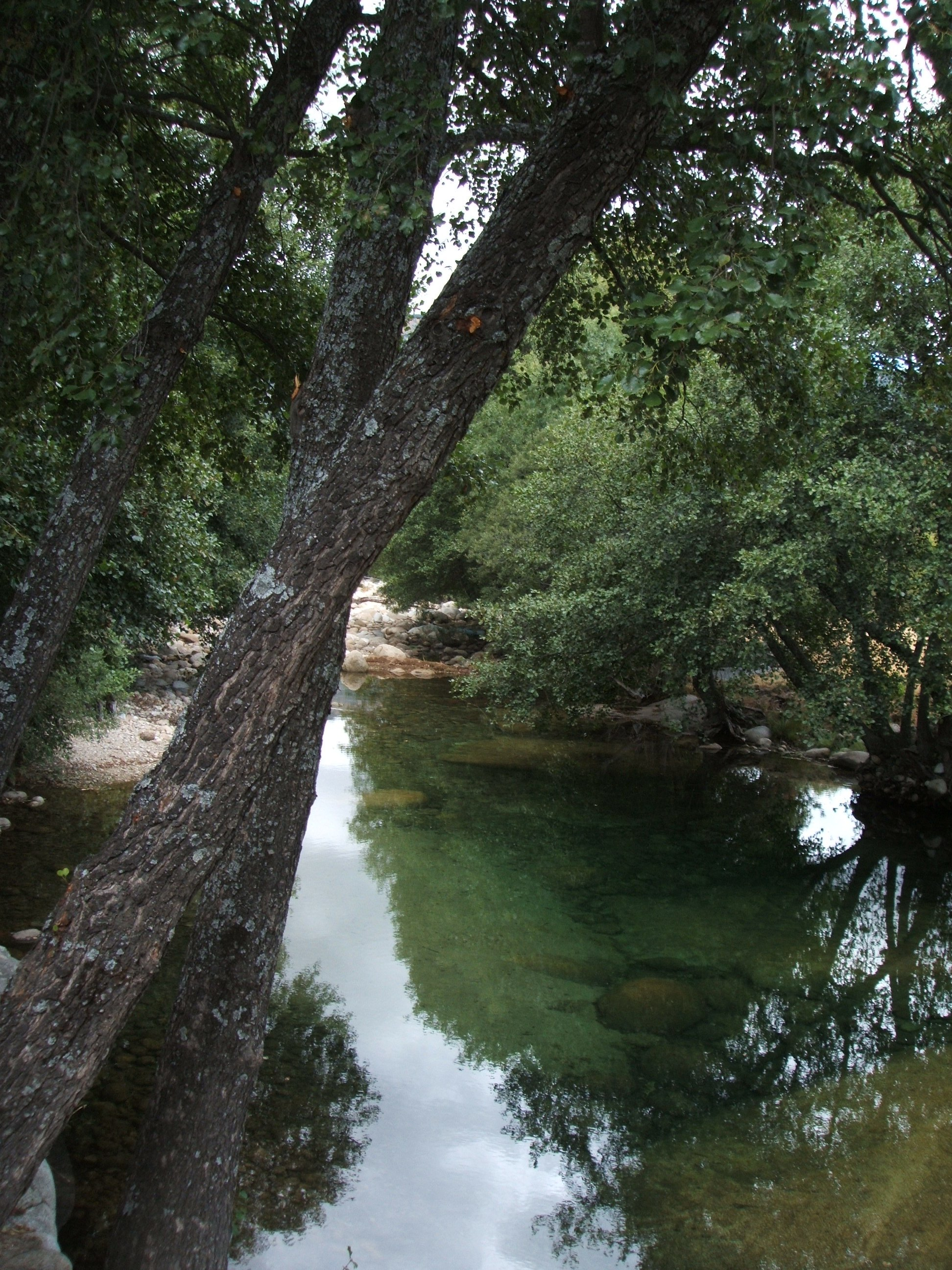
Bohoyo's ravine

Bohoyo is a municipality located in the province of Ávila, Castile and León, Spain.

== Population ==
Historical population
Year	Pop.	±% p.a.
2023	215	—
2024	214	−0.47%
2025	205	−4.21%
Source: INE
