= Rebollar, Cáceres =

Coordinates: 40°09′N 5°54′W

Rebollar
- Flag Coat of arms

- Location in Spain.
- Country: Spain
- Autonomous community: Cáceres

Area
  - Total: 12 km^{2} (4.6 sq mi)
- Elevation: 622 m (2,041 ft)

Population (2025-01-01)
  - Total: 203
  - Density: 17/km^{2} (44/sq mi)
- Time zone: UTC+1 (CET)
  - Summer (DST): UTC+2 (CEST)

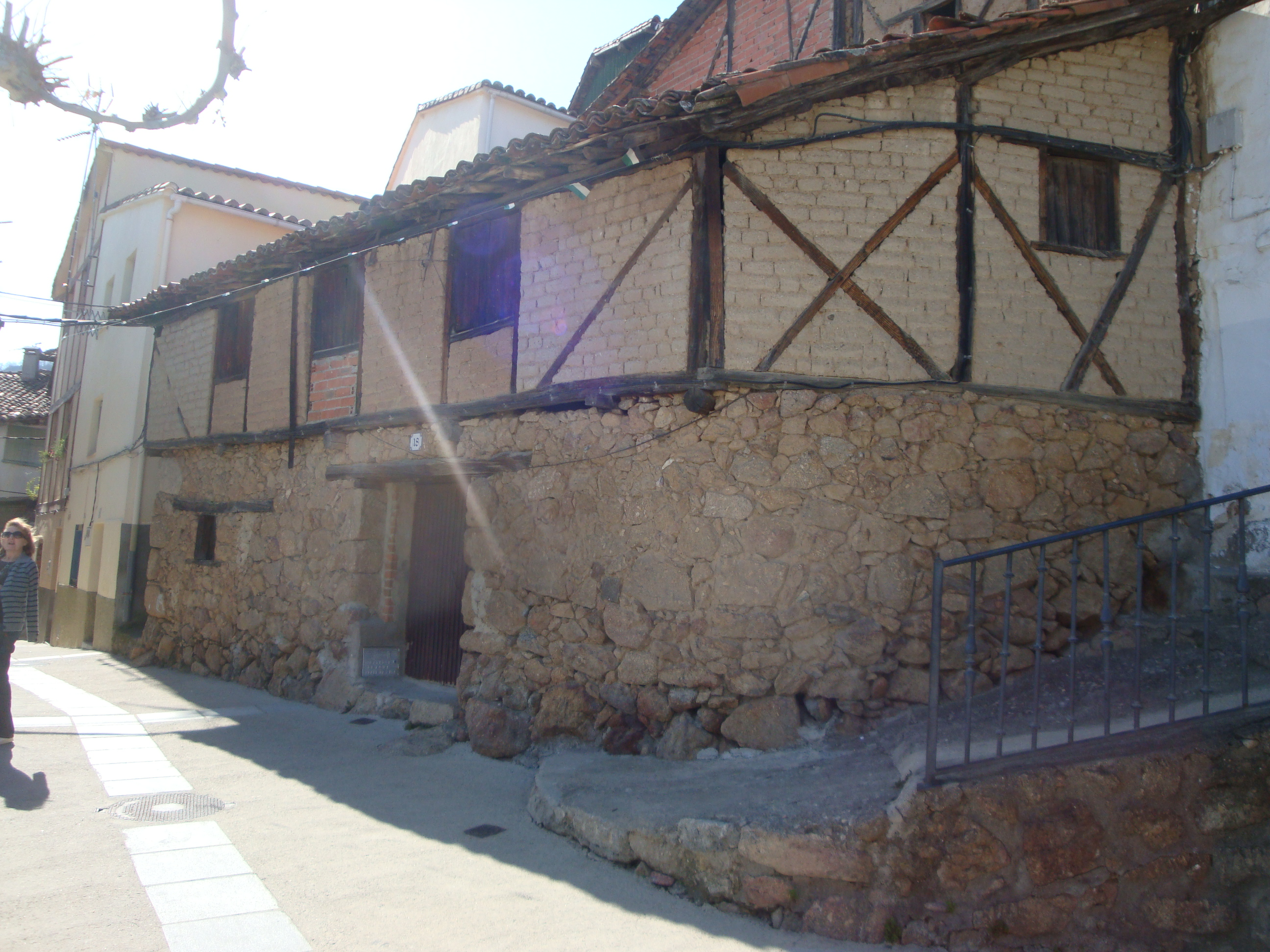
house partially built of adobe in Rebollar (Caceres)

Rebollar is a municipality in the province of Cáceres and autonomous community of Extremadura, Spain. The municipality covers an area of 12 square kilometres (4.6 sq mi) and as of 2011 had a population of 230 people.

== See also ==
- List of municipalities in Cáceres
