= Valdastillas =

- municipality
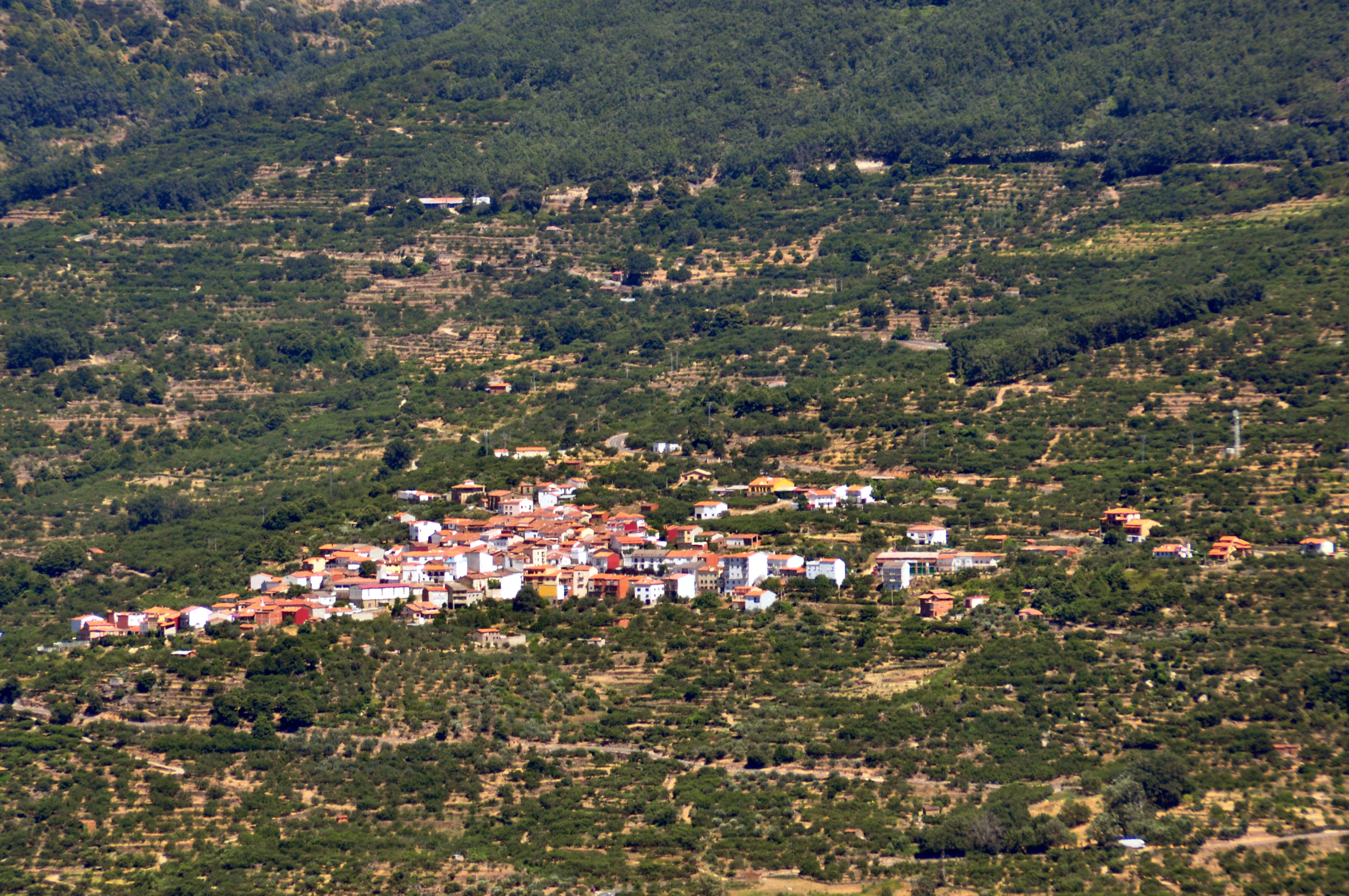

- Flag Coat of arms

- Location in Spain
- Coordinates: 40°8′N 5°53′W
- Country: Spain
- Autonomous community: Extremadura
- Province: Cáceres
- Municipality: Valdastillas

Area
  - Total: 8 km^{2} (3.1 sq mi)

Population (2025-01-01)
  - Total: 332
- Time zone: UTC+1 (CET)
  - Summer (DST): UTC+2 (CEST)

Valdastillas is a municipality located in the Sierra de Tormantos, province of Cáceres, Extremadura, Spain. According to the 2014 census, the municipality has a population of 335 inhabitants.

== See also ==
- List of municipalities in Cáceres
