= Navaconcejo =

- municipality
- Flag Coat of arms

- Location of Navaconcejo within Spain
- Coordinates: 40°10′42″N 5°49′54″W
- Country: Spain
- Autonomous community: Extremadura
- Province: Cáceres
- Municipality: Navaconcejo

Area
  - Total: 51 km^{2} (20 sq mi)
- Elevation: 455 m (1,493 ft)

Population (2025-01-01)
  - Total: 2,037
  - Density: 40/km^{2} (100/sq mi)
- Time zone: UTC+1 (CET)
  - Summer (DST): UTC+2 (CEST)
- Website: Ayuntamiento de Navaconcejo

Navaconcejo is a municipality located in the province of Cáceres, Extremadura, Spain. According to the 2010 census (INE), the municipality has a population of 2046 inhabitants.

== See also ==
- List of municipalities in Cáceres
