= Santa María de los Caballeros =

Santa María de los Caballeros, Spain
- municipality
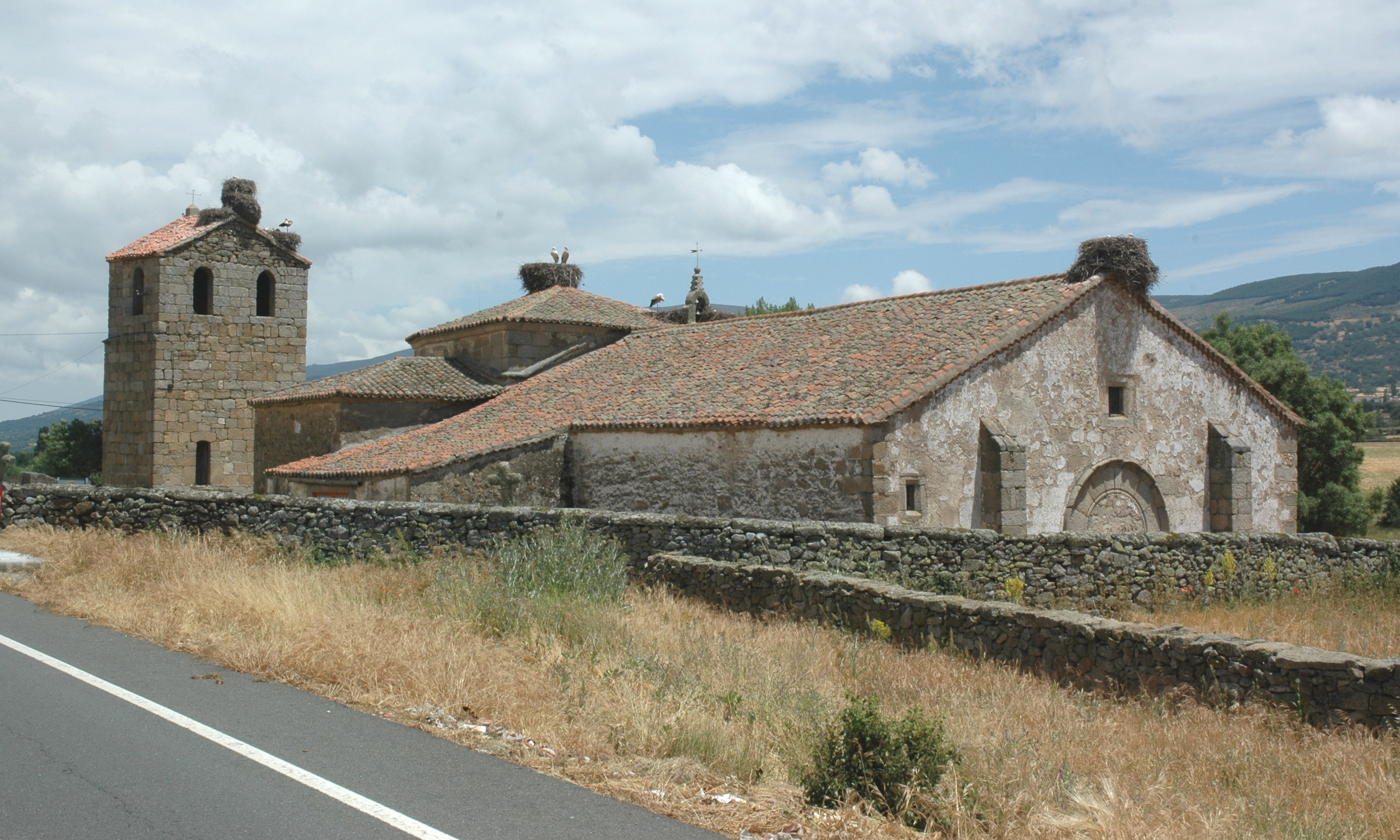
- Church of Santa María de los Caballeros

- Flag Coat of arms

- Location in Spain. Santa María de los Caballeros, Spain (Spain)
- Coordinates: 40°23′20″N 5°27′06″W
- Country: Spain
- Autonomous community: Castile and León
- Province: Ávila
- Municipality: Santa María de los Caballeros

Area
  - Total: 22 km^{2} (8.5 sq mi)
- Elevation: 1,040 m (3,410 ft)

Population (2025-01-01)
  - Total: 53
  - Density: 2.4/km^{2} (6.2/sq mi)
- Time zone: UTC+1 (CET)
  - Summer (DST): UTC+2 (CEST)
- Postal Code: 05580
- Website: Official website

Santa María de los Caballeros is a municipality located in the province of Ávila, Castile and León, Spain.

The parish church of Santa María de los Caballeros was built in the 16th century and its transepts were added in the 19th or 20th century.

== Population ==
Historical population
Year	Pop.	±% p.a.
2023	67	—
2024	72	+7.46%
2025	53	−26.39%
Source: INE
