= Casas del Castañar =

- Municipality
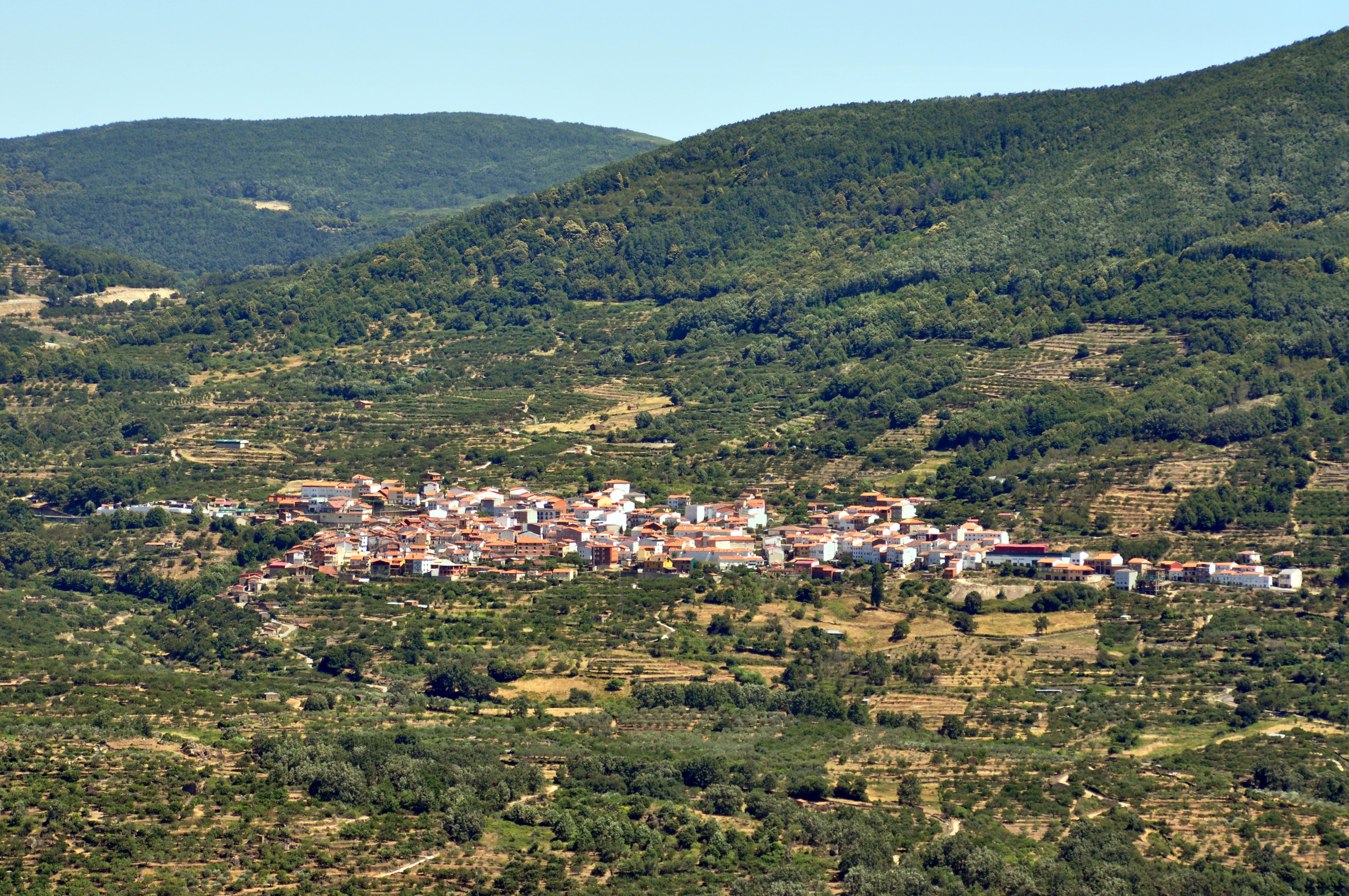
- View of the town of Casas del Castañar from the neighboring town of El Torno

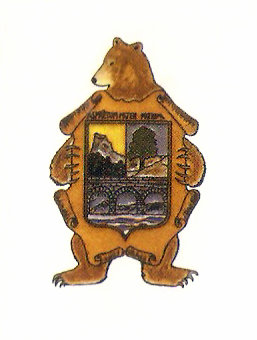
- Coat of arms

- Location of Casas del Castañar in Spain. Casas del Castañar (Extremadura)
- Coordinates: 40°07′N 5°54′W
- Country: Spain
- Autonomous community: Extremadura
- Province: Cáceres
- Judicial district: Plasencia

Government
  - Mayor: Francisco García Calle

Area
  - Total: 24.63 km^{2} (9.51 sq mi)
- Elevation: 675 m (2,215 ft)

Population (2023)
  - Total: 579
  - Density: 23.5/km^{2} (60.9/sq mi)
- Time zone: UTC+1 (CET)
  - Summer (DST): UTC+2 (CEST)

Casas del Castañar (Spanish pronunciation: [ˈkasas ðel kastaˈɲaɾ]) is a municipality in the province of Cáceres in Spain, near the Sierra de Gredos mountain range.

== See also ==
- List of municipalities in Cáceres
