= Tornavacas =

Coordinates: 40°15′N 5°41′W

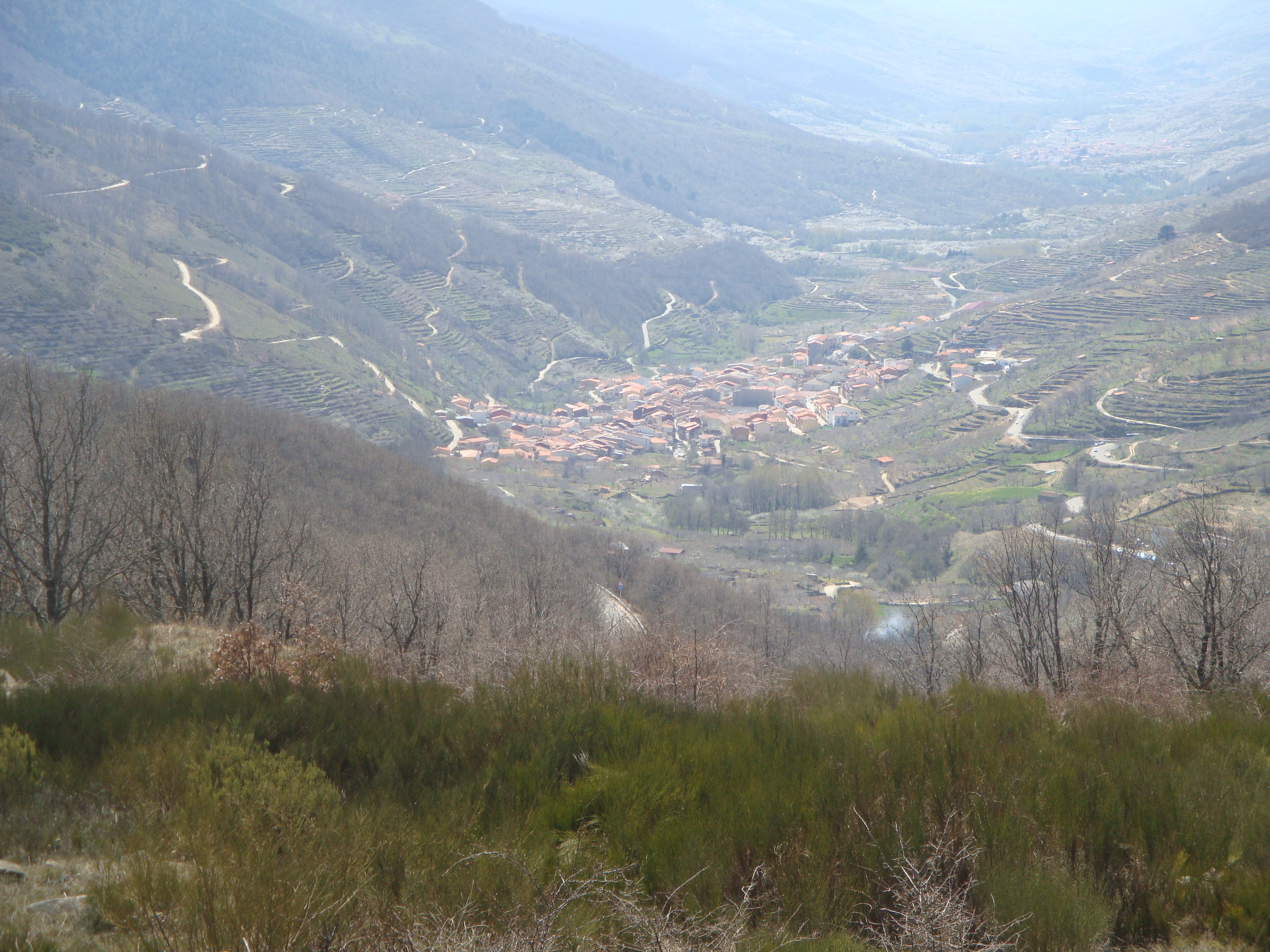
- View of Tornavacas

- Flag Coat of arms

- Location in Spain.
- Country: Spain
- Autonomous community: Cáceres

Area
  - Total: 76.6 km^{2} (29.6 sq mi)
- Elevation: 871 m (2,858 ft)

Population (2025-01-01)
  - Total: 989
  - Density: 12.9/km^{2} (33.4/sq mi)
- Time zone: UTC+1 (CET)
  - Summer (DST): UTC+2 (CEST)
- Website: www.tornavacas.es

Tornavacas is a municipality located in the province of Cáceres, in the autonomous community of Extremadura, Spain. The municipality covers an area of 595 square kilometres (230 sq mi) and as of 2011 had a population of 1170 people.

== See also ==
- List of municipalities in Cáceres
