= Cabezuela del Valle =

Cabezuela del Valle, Spain
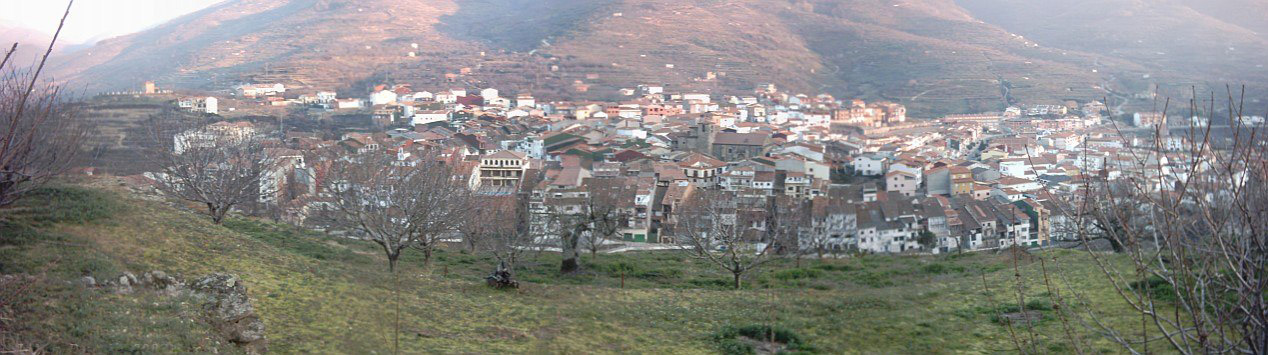
- Panoramic view of Cabezuela del Valle.

- Flag Coat of arms
- Interactive map of Cabezuela del Valle, Spain
- Coordinates: 40°11′N 5°48′W
- Country: Spain
- Autonomous community: Extremadura
- Province: Cáceres
- Municipality: Cabezuela del Valle

Area
  - Total: 57 km^{2} (22 sq mi)
- Elevation: 515 m (1,690 ft)

Population (2025-01-01)
  - Total: 2,049
  - Density: 36/km^{2} (93/sq mi)
- Time zone: UTC+1 (CET)
  - Summer (DST): UTC+2 (CEST)

Cabezuela del Valle is a municipality in the province of Cáceres, Extremadura, Spain. According to the 2005 census (INE), the municipality has a population of 2173.

== See also ==
- List of municipalities in Cáceres
