= San Lorenzo de Tormes =

- municipality
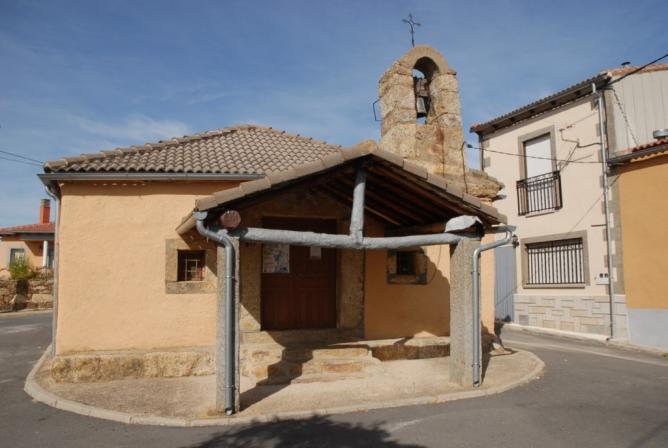

- Flag Coat of arms

- Location in Spain. San Lorenzo de Tormes (Spain)
- Coordinates: 40°22′13″N 5°29′17″W
- Country: Spain
- Autonomous community: Castile and León
- Province: Ávila
- Municipality: San Lorenzo de Tormes

Area
  - Total: 14 km^{2} (5.4 sq mi)

Population (2025-01-01)
  - Total: 32
  - Density: 2.3/km^{2} (5.9/sq mi)
- Time zone: UTC+1 (CET)
  - Summer (DST): UTC+2 (CEST)
- Website: Official website

San Lorenzo de Tormes is a municipality located in the province of Ávila, Castile and León, Spain.

== Population ==
Historical population
Year	Pop.	±% p.a.
2023	32	—
2024	30	−6.25%
2025	32	+6.67%
Source: INE
