= Jerte =

Coordinates: 40°13′N 5°45′W

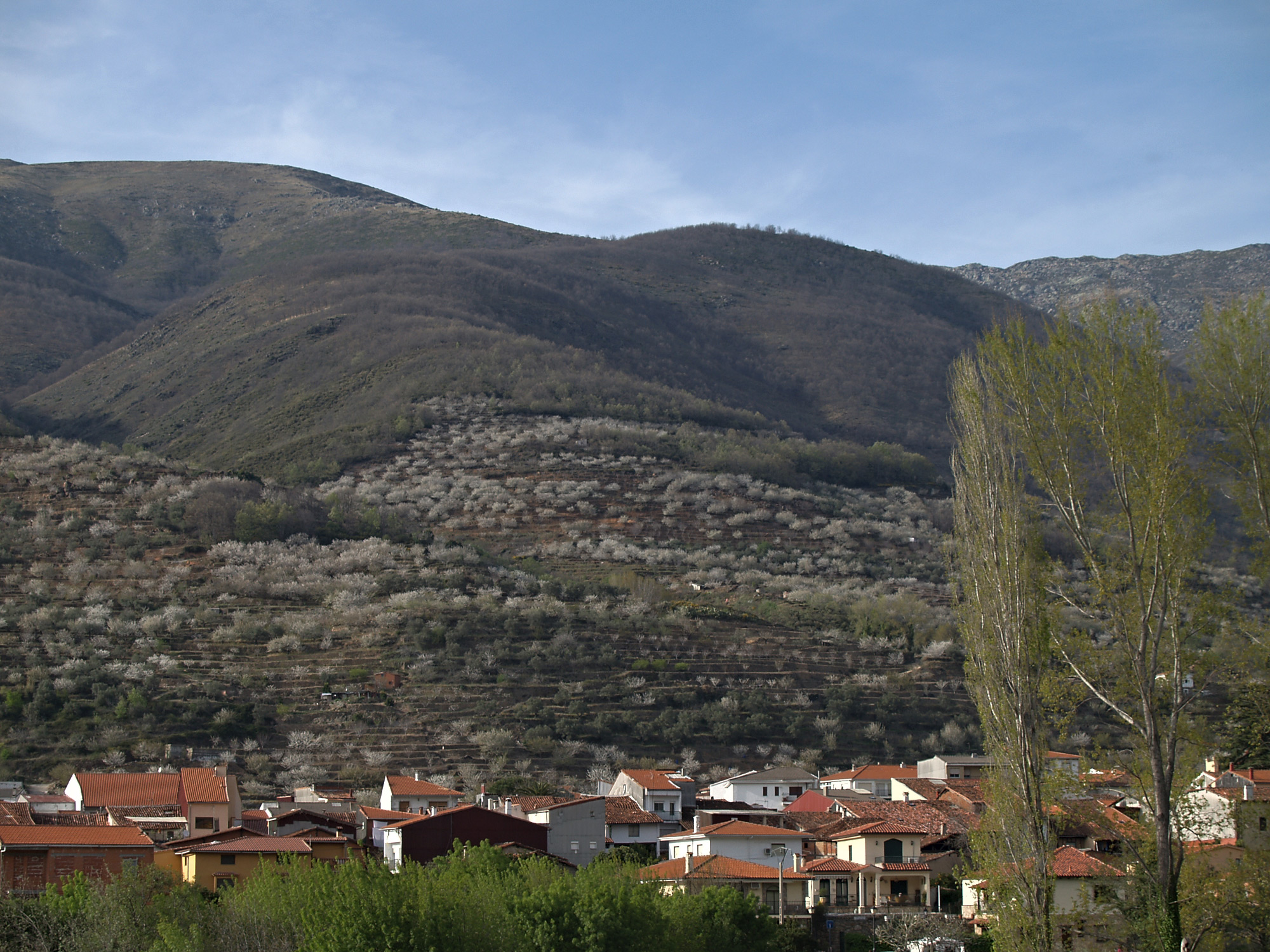
- View of Jerte

- Coat of arms

- Location in Spain.
- Country: Spain
- Autonomous community: Cáceres

Area
  - Total: 59 km^{2} (23 sq mi)
- Elevation: 604 m (1,982 ft)

Population (2025-01-01)
  - Total: 1,189
  - Density: 20/km^{2} (52/sq mi)
- Time zone: UTC+1 (CET)
  - Summer (DST): UTC+2 (CEST)
- Website: www.jerte.es

Jerte is a municipality in the province of Cáceres and autonomous community of Extremadura, Spain. The municipality covers an area of 59 square kilometres (23 sq mi), and as of 2011 had a population of 1316 people.

== See also ==
- List of municipalities in Cáceres
