= Solana de Ávila =

- municipality
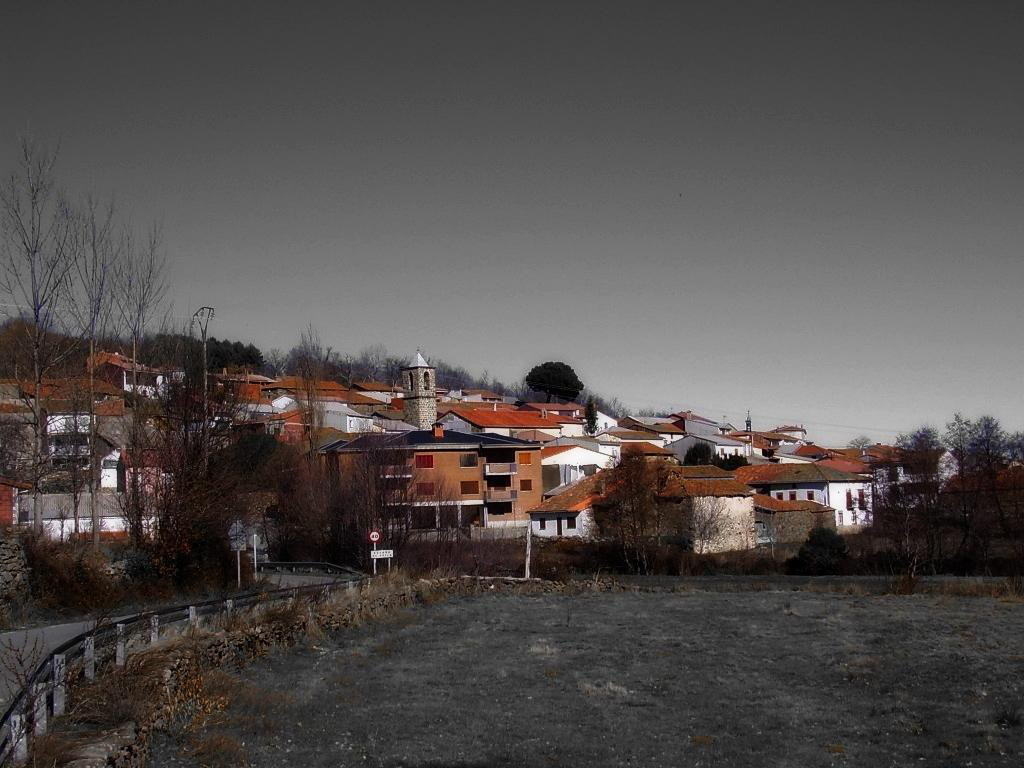
- Solana de Ávila, (Ávila), Spain.

- Location in Spain. Solana de Ávila (Spain)
- Coordinates: 40°18′53″N 5°36′57″W
- Country: Spain
- Autonomous community: Castile and León
- Province: Ávila
- Municipality: Solana de Ávila

Area
  - Total: 68 km^{2} (26 sq mi)

Population (2025-01-01)
  - Total: 95
  - Density: 1.4/km^{2} (3.6/sq mi)
- Time zone: UTC+1 (CET)
  - Summer (DST): UTC+2 (CEST)
- Website: Official website

Solana de Ávila is a municipality located in the province of Ávila, Castile and León, Spain.

== Population ==
Historical population
Year	Pop.	±% p.a.
2023	107	—
2024	100	−6.54%
2025	95	−5.00%
Source: INE
