= La Horcajada =

- municipality
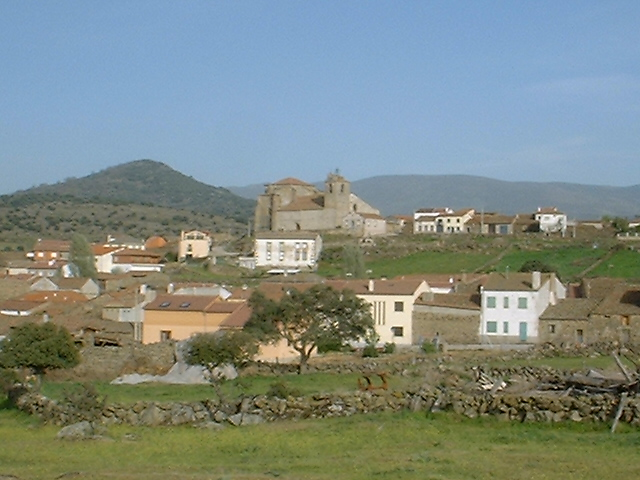
- La Horcajada

- Flag Coat of arms

- Location in Spain. La Horcajada (Castile and León)
- Coordinates: 40°26′11″N 5°27′59″W
- Country: Spain
- Autonomous community: Castile and León
- Province: Ávila
- Municipality: La Horcajada

Area
  - Total: 46 km^{2} (18 sq mi)

Population (2025-01-01)
  - Total: 434
  - Density: 9.4/km^{2} (24/sq mi)
- Time zone: UTC+1 (CET)
  - Summer (DST): UTC+2 (CEST)
- Website: Official website

La Horcajada is a municipality located in the province of Ávila, Castile and León, Spain. According to the 2004 census (INE), the municipality has a population of 701 inhabitants.
