= Puerto Castilla, Ávila =

Puerto Castilla
- municipality
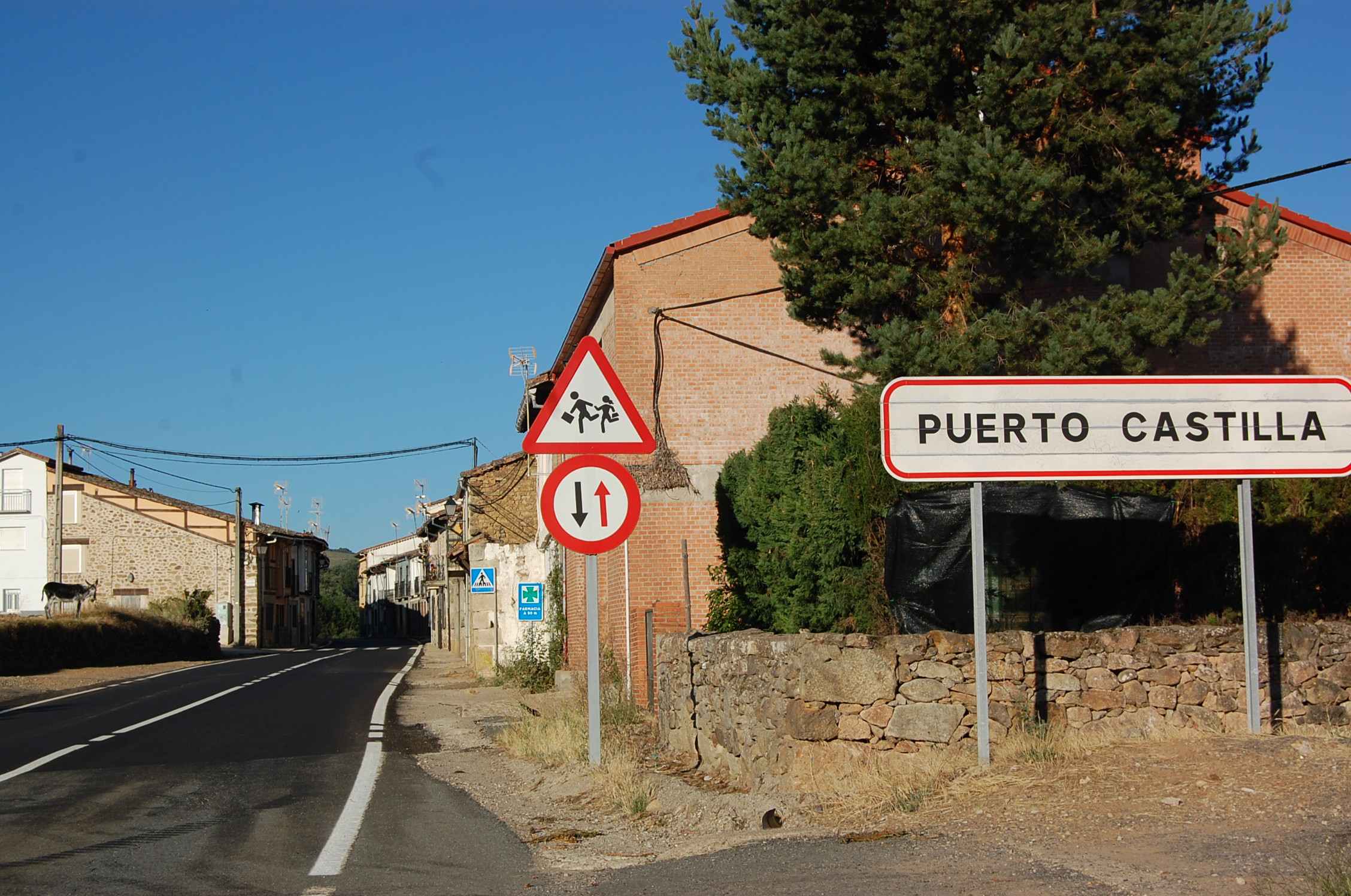
- Puerto Castilla.

- Flag Coat of arms

- Location in Spain. Puerto Castilla (Castile and León)
- Coordinates: 40°17′22″N 5°37′47″W
- Country: Spain
- Autonomous community: Castile and León
- Province: Ávila
- Municipality: Puerto Castilla

Area
  - Total: 43 km^{2} (17 sq mi)

Population (2025-01-01)
  - Total: 99
  - Density: 3.3/km^{2} (8.5/sq mi)
- Time zone: UTC+1 (CET)
  - Summer (DST): UTC+2 (CEST)
- Website: Official website

Puerto Castilla is a municipality located in the province of Ávila, Castile and León, Spain.

== Population ==
Historical population
Year	Pop.	±% p.a.
2023	100	—
2024	98	−2.00%
2025	99	+1.02%
Source: INE
