= Zapardiel =

Zapardiel may refer to:

- Bercial de Zapardiel, municipality located in the province of Ávila, Castile and León, Spain
- Bernuy-Zapardiel, municipality located in the province of Ávila, Castile and León, Spain
- Castellanos de Zapardiel, municipality located in the province of Ávila, Castile and León, Spain
- Salvador de Zapardiel, municipality located in the province of Valladolid, Castile and León, Spain
- San Esteban de Zapardiel, municipality located in the province of Ávila, Castile and León, Spain
- Zapardiel de la Cañada, municipality located in the province of Ávila, Castile and León, Spain
- Zapardiel de la Ribera, municipality located in the province of Ávila, Castile and León, Spain
