= Salvador de Zapardiel =

Coordinates: 41°07′N 4°52′W

Salvador de Zapardiel, Spain
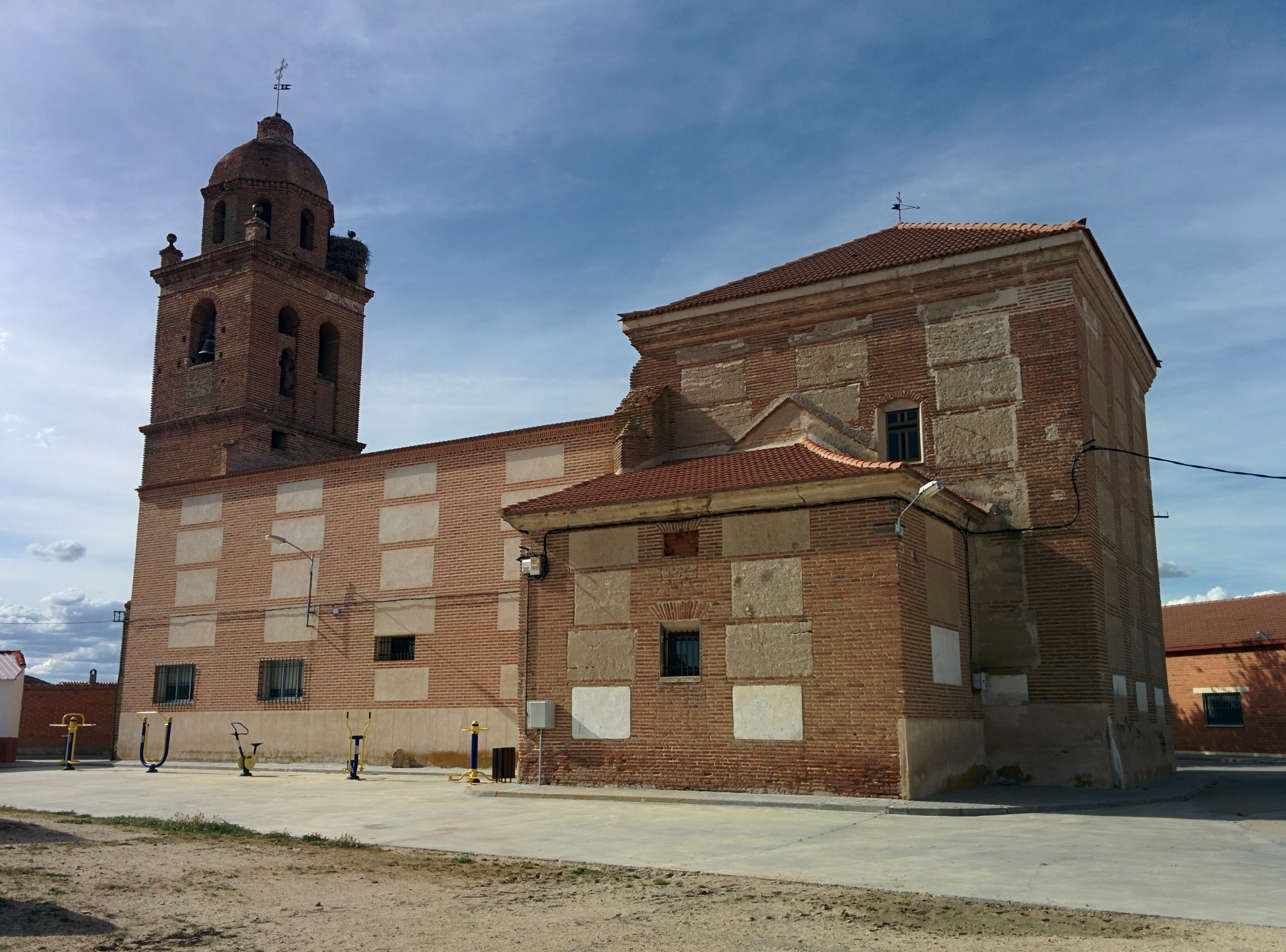
- Church of the Invention of the Holy Cross, in Salvador de Zapardiel (Valladolid, Spain).
- Interactive map of Salvador de Zapardiel, Spain
- Country: Spain
- Autonomous community: Castile and León
- Province: Valladolid
- Municipality: Salvador de Zapardiel

Area
  - Total: 26.24 km^{2} (10.13 sq mi)

Population (2025-01-01)
  - Total: 99
  - Density: 3.8/km^{2} (9.8/sq mi)
- Time zone: UTC+1 (CET)
  - Summer (DST): UTC+2 (CEST)

Salvador de Zapardiel is a municipality located in the province of Valladolid, Castile and León, Spain. According to the 2004 census (INE), the municipality has a population of 188 inhabitants.
