= San Esteban de Zapardiel =

- municipality
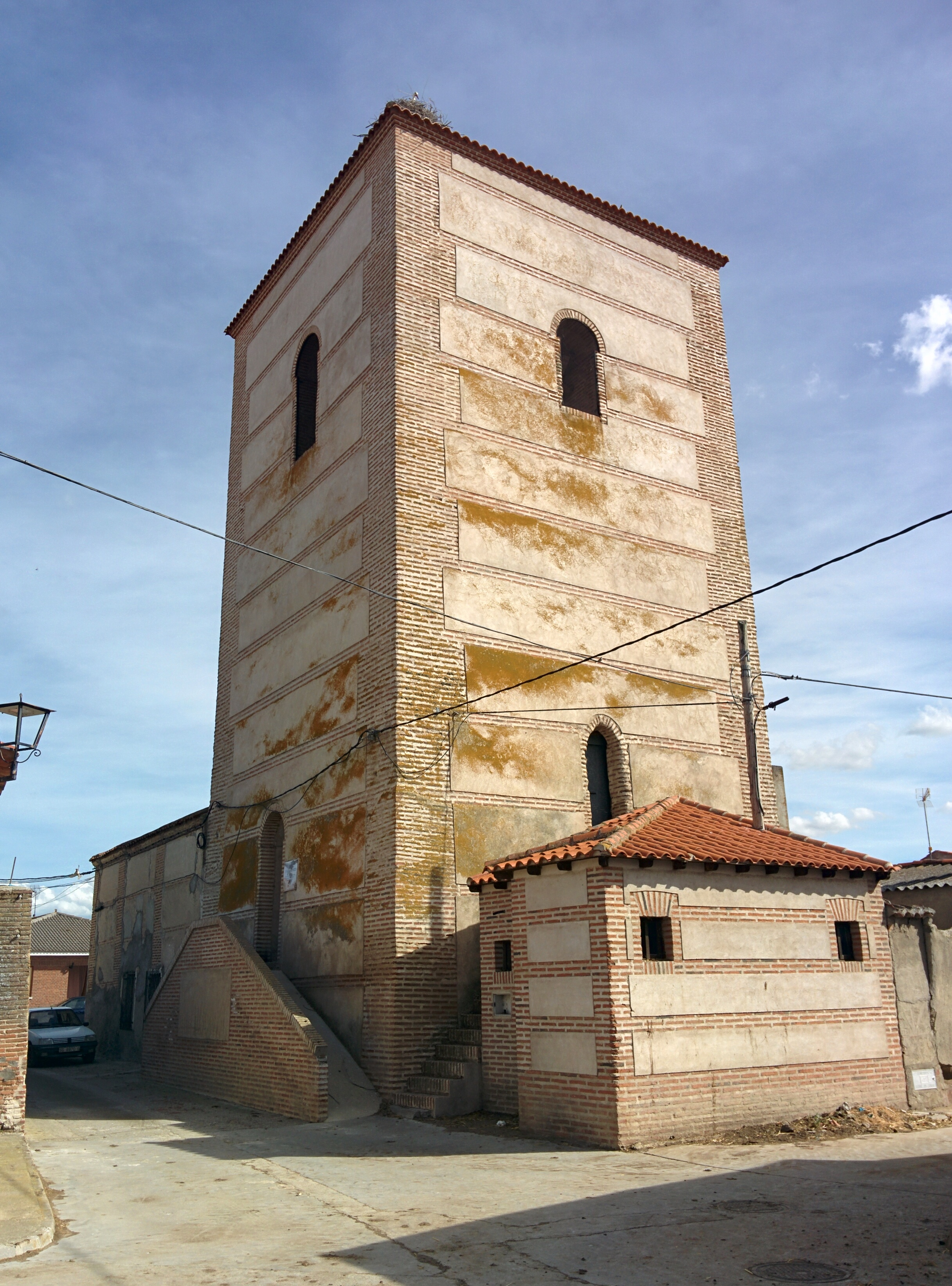
- Tower in San Esteban de Zapardiel.
- Flag Coat of arms
- Location in Spain. San Esteban de Zapardiel (Spain)
- Coordinates: 41°05′35″N 4°54′03″W
- Country: Spain
- Autonomous community: Castile and León
- Province: Ávila
- Municipality: San Esteban de Zapardiel

Area
  - Total: 12 km^{2} (4.6 sq mi)

Population (2025-01-01)
  - Total: 40
  - Density: 3.3/km^{2} (8.6/sq mi)
- Time zone: UTC+1 (CET)
  - Summer (DST): UTC+2 (CEST)
- Website: Official website

San Esteban de Zapardiel is a municipality located in the province of Ávila, Castile and León, Spain.

== Population ==
Historical population
Year	Pop.	±% p.a.
2023	39	—
2024	40	+2.56%
2025	40	+0.00%
Source: INE
