= Bercial de Zapardiel =

- municipality
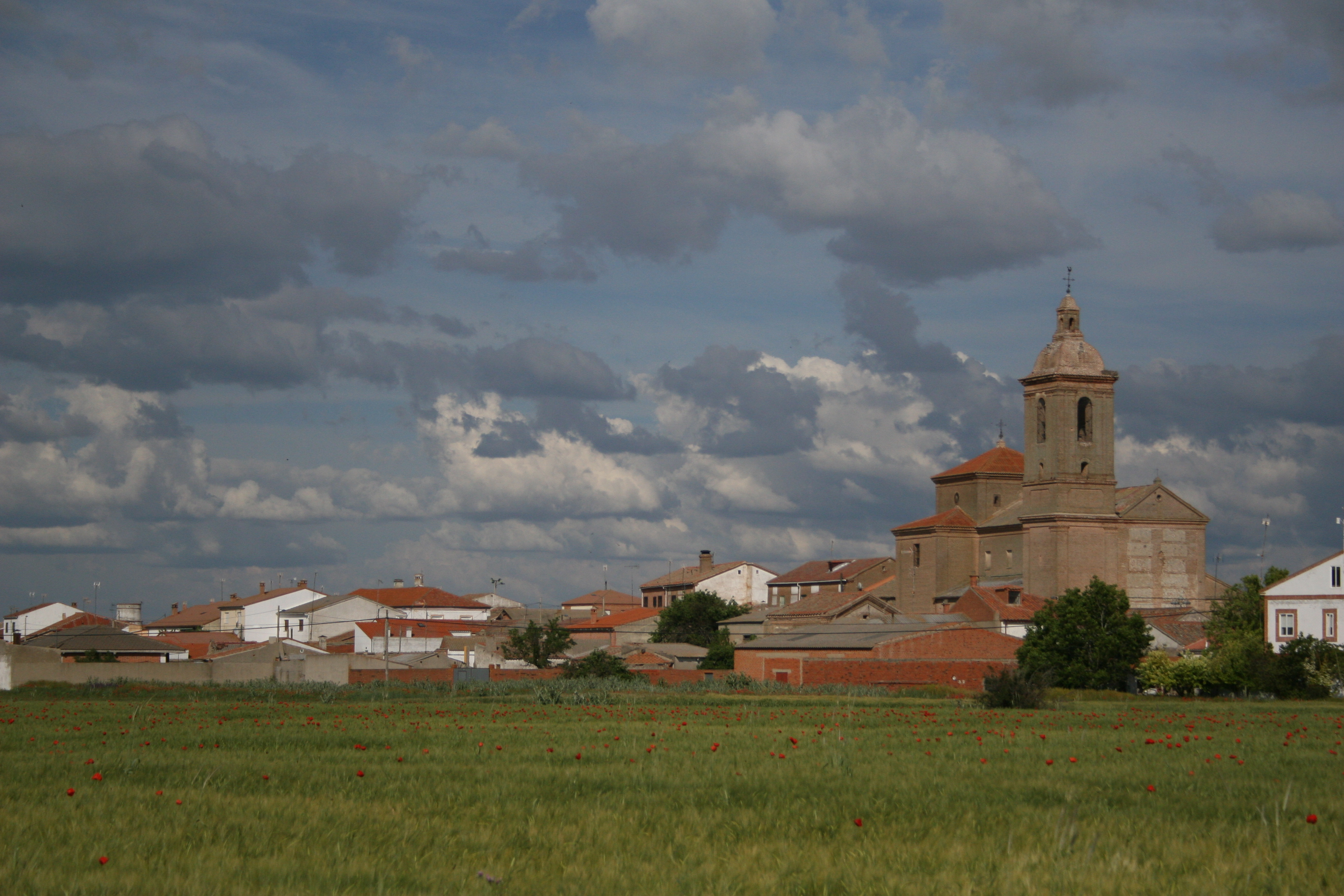
- View of Bercial De Zapardiel

- Flag Coat of arms

- Extension of the municipal term within the province of Ávila

- Location in Spain. Bercial de Zapardiel (Spain)
- Coordinates: 41°02′47″N 4°58′09″W
- Country: Spain
- Autonomous community: Castile and León
- Province: Ávila
- Municipality: Bercial de Zapardiel

Area
  - Total: 17.31 km^{2} (6.68 sq mi)
- Elevation: 807 m (2,648 ft)

Population (2025-01-01)
  - Total: 166
  - Density: 9.59/km^{2} (24.8/sq mi)
- Time zone: UTC+1 (CET)
  - Summer (DST): UTC+2 (CEST)
- Website: Official website

Bercial de Zapardiel is a municipality located in the province of Ávila, Castile and León, Spain. According to the 2025 census (INE), the municipality had a population of 166 inhabitants.

== Population ==
Historical population
Year	Pop.	±% p.a.
2023	178	—
2024	173	−2.81%
2025	166	−4.05%
Source: INE
