= Navacepedilla de Corneja =

- municipality
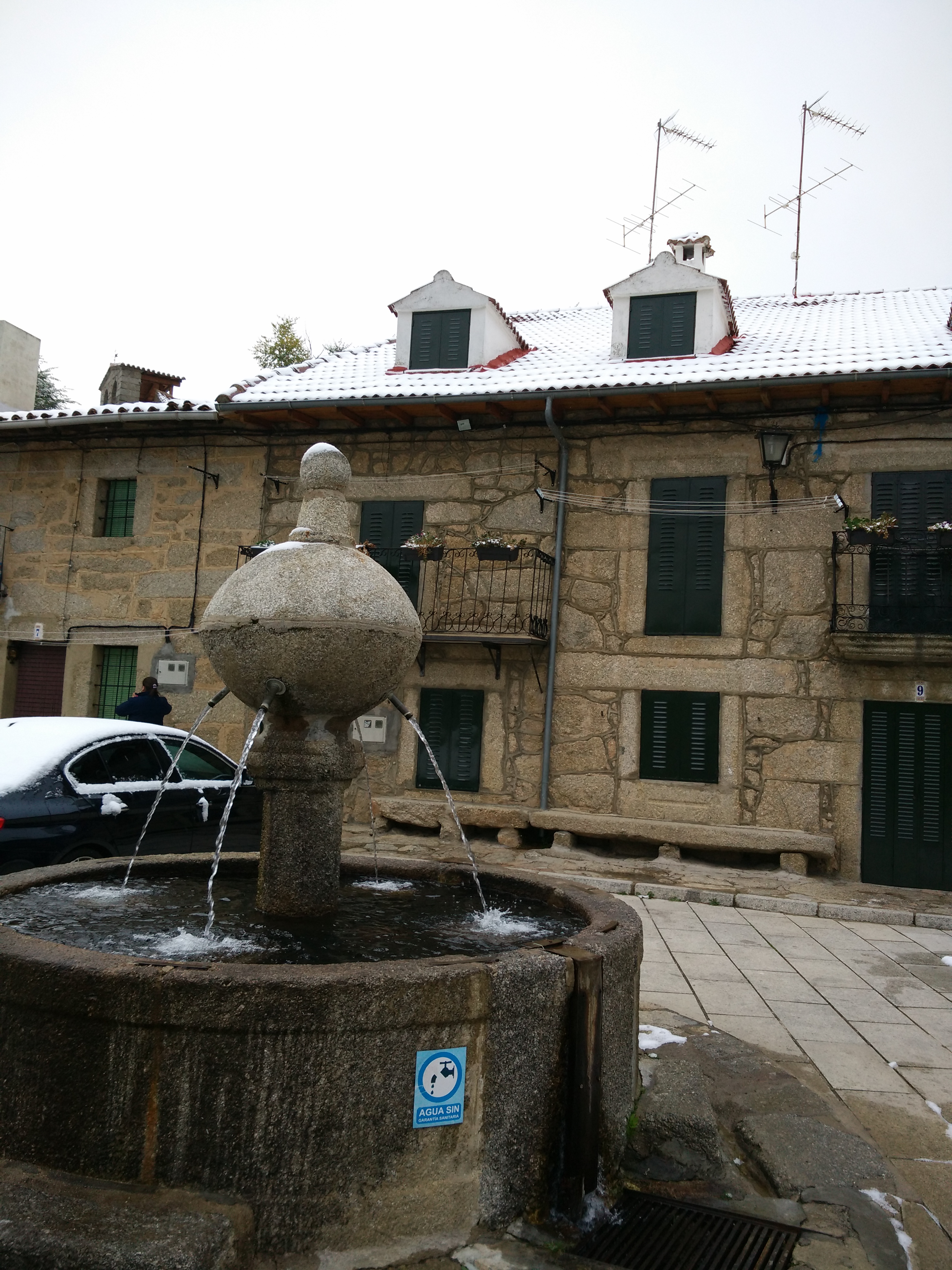

- Coat of arms

- Location in Spain. Navacepedilla de Corneja (Spain)
- Coordinates: 40°29′09″N 5°11′03″W
- Country: Spain
- Autonomous community: Castile and León
- Province: Ávila

Area
  - Total: 29 km^{2} (11 sq mi)

Population (2025-01-01)
  - Total: 99
  - Density: 3.4/km^{2} (8.8/sq mi)
- Time zone: UTC+1 (CET)
  - Summer (DST): UTC+2 (CEST)
- Website: Official website

Navacepedilla de Corneja is a municipality located in the province of Ávila, Castile and León, Spain.

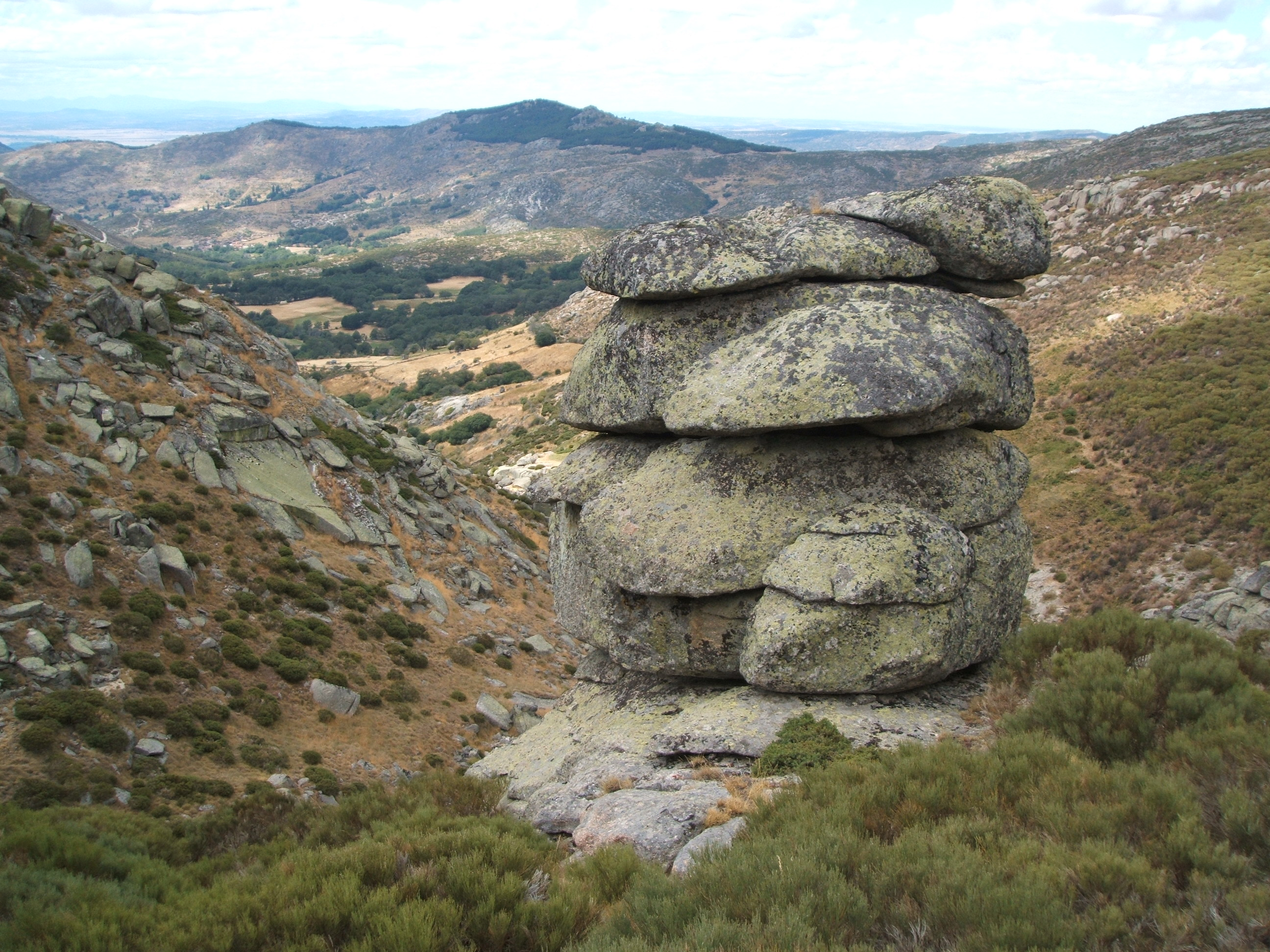
Tor. Paleozoic Rocks, in Navacepedilla de Corneja.

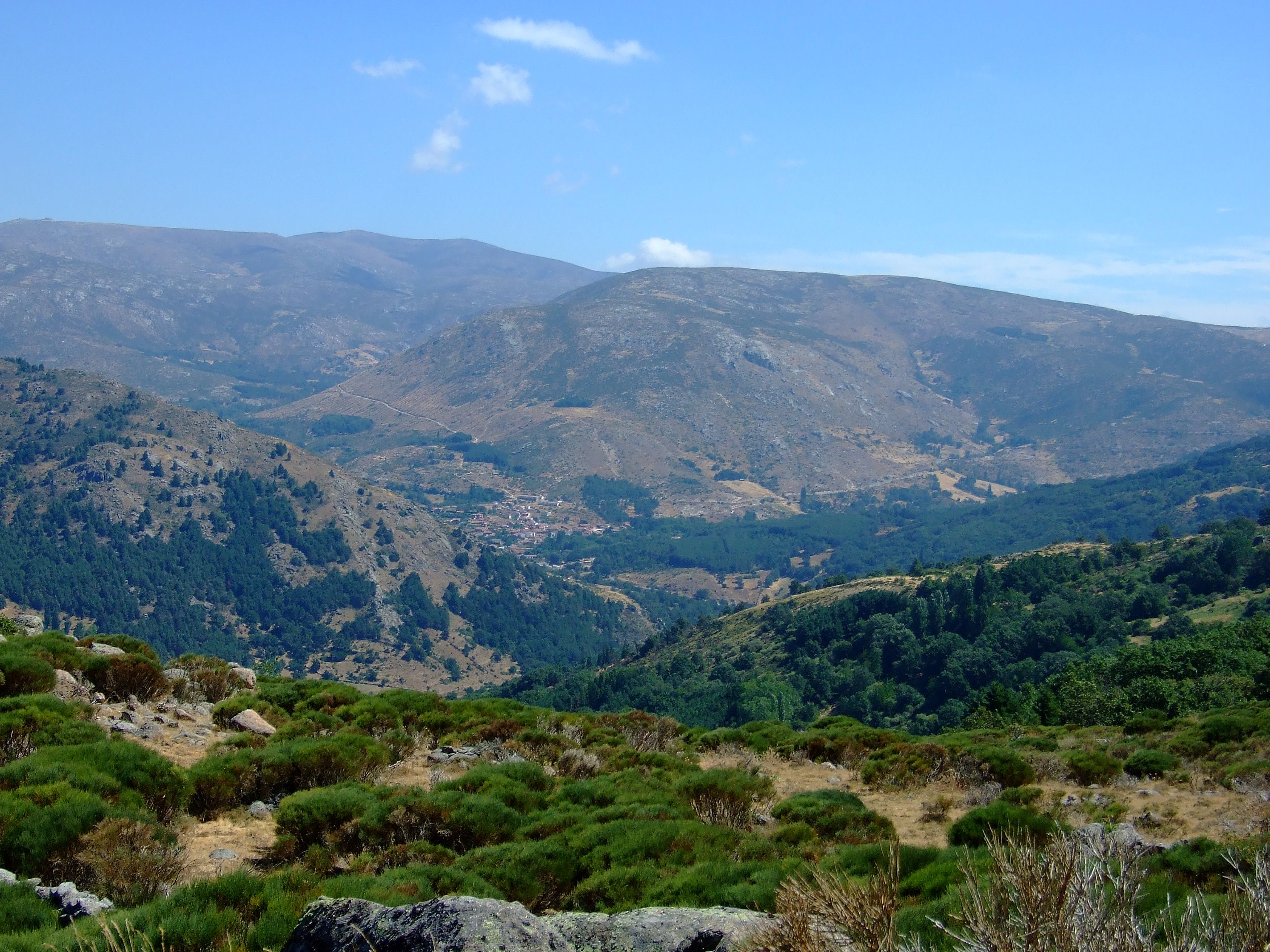
View of Navacepedilla de Corneja

== Population ==
Historical population
Year	Pop.	±% p.a.
2023	94	—
2024	100	+6.38%
2025	99	−1.00%
Source: INE
