= Flores de Ávila =

- Municipality
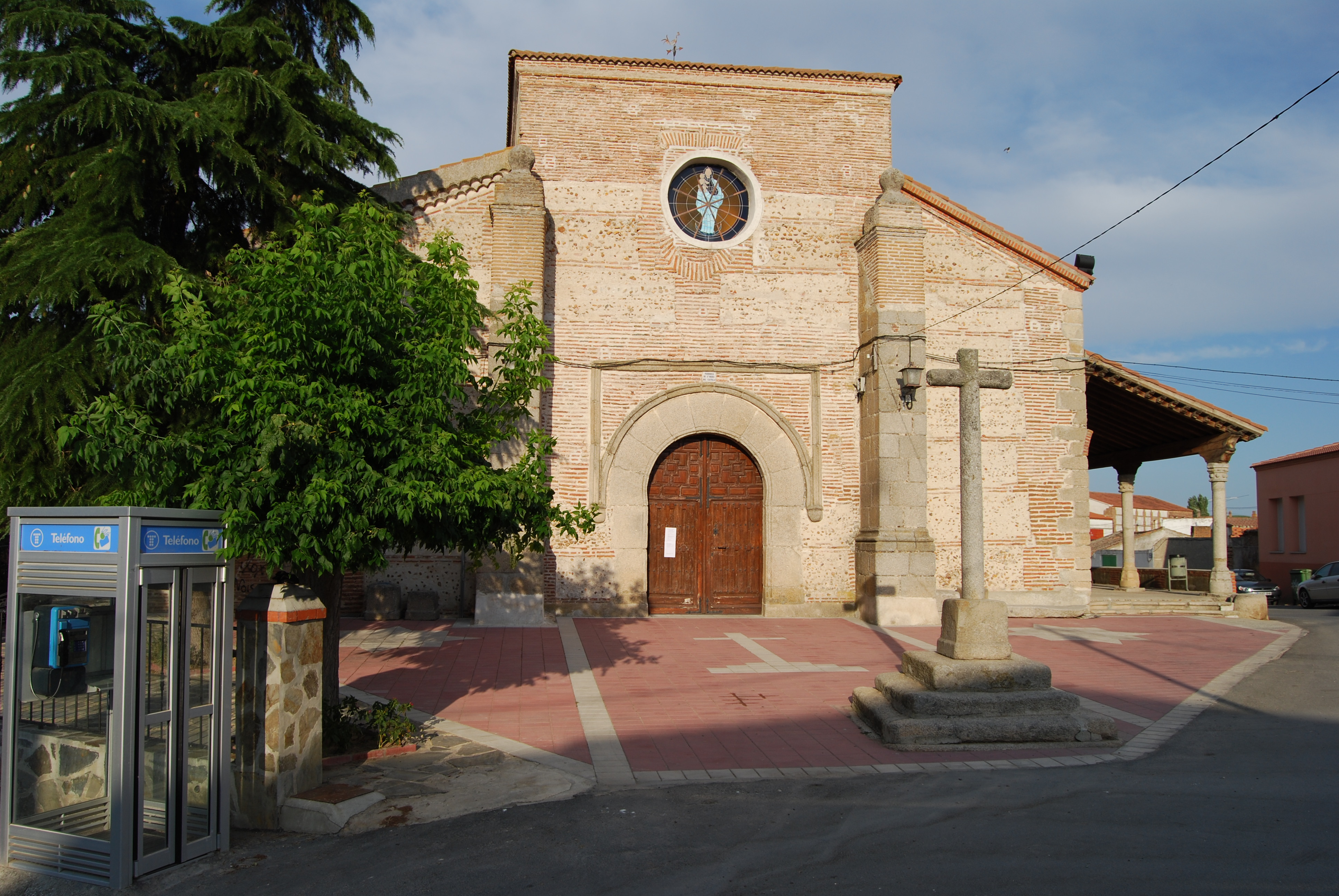
- Church of Santa María del Castillo
- Flag Coat of arms
- Location in Spain. Flores de Ávila (Spain)
- Coordinates: 40°56′00″N 5°04′44″W
- Country: Spain
- Autonomous community: Castile and León
- Province: Ávila
- Municipality: Flores de Ávila

Area
  - Total: 43.04 km^{2} (16.62 sq mi)
- Elevation: 898 m (2,946 ft)

Population (2025-01-01)
  - Total: 262
  - Density: 6.09/km^{2} (15.8/sq mi)
- Time zone: UTC+1 (CET)
  - Summer (DST): UTC+2 (CEST)
- Website: Official website

Flores de Ávila is a municipality located in the province of Ávila, Castile and León, Spain, about 164 km from Madrid.

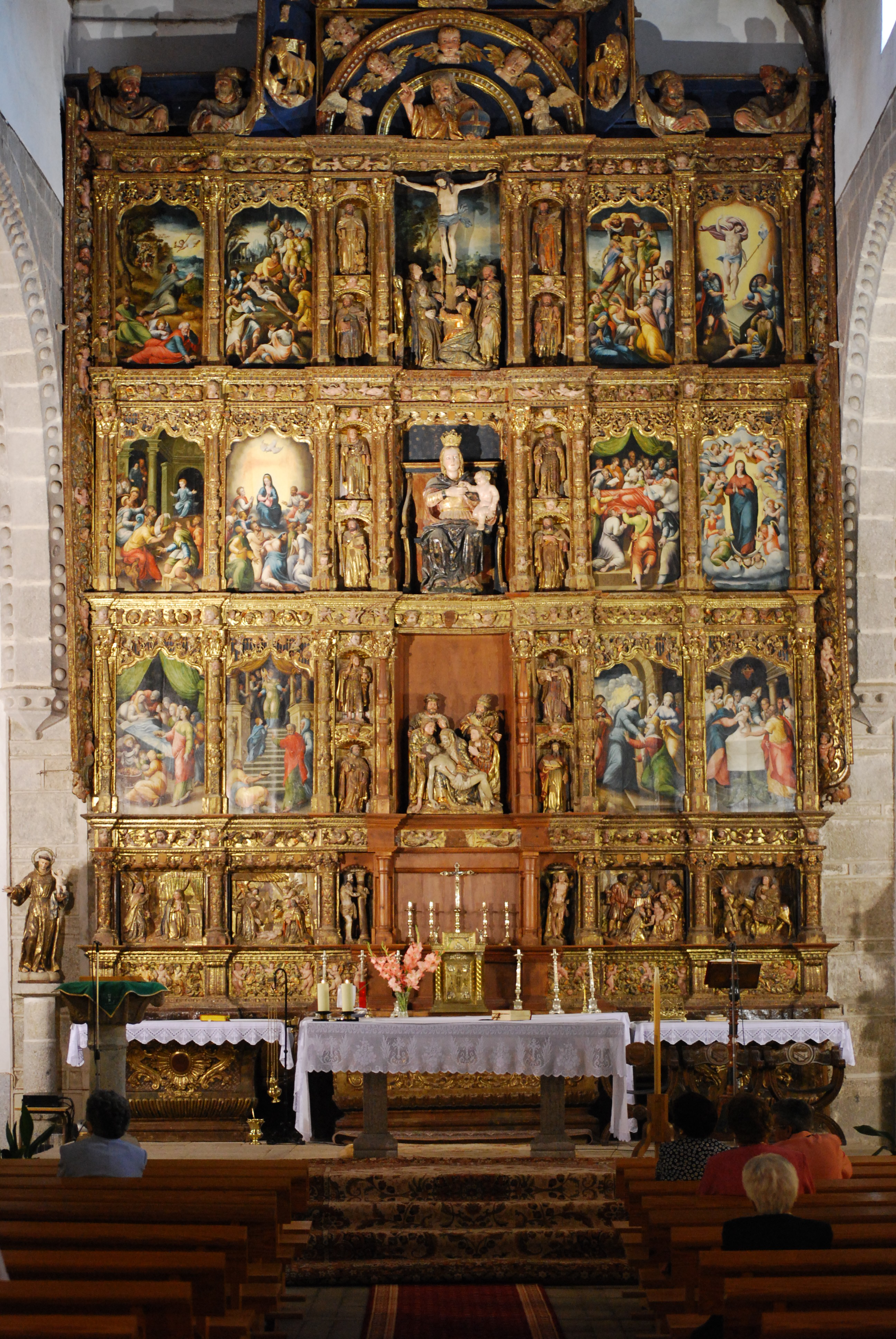
Altarpiece of the Church of Santa María del Castillo

== Population ==
Historical population
Year	Pop.	±% p.a.
2023	271	—
2024	270	−0.37%
2025	262	−2.96%
Source: INE
