= Berrocalejo de Aragona =

- municipality
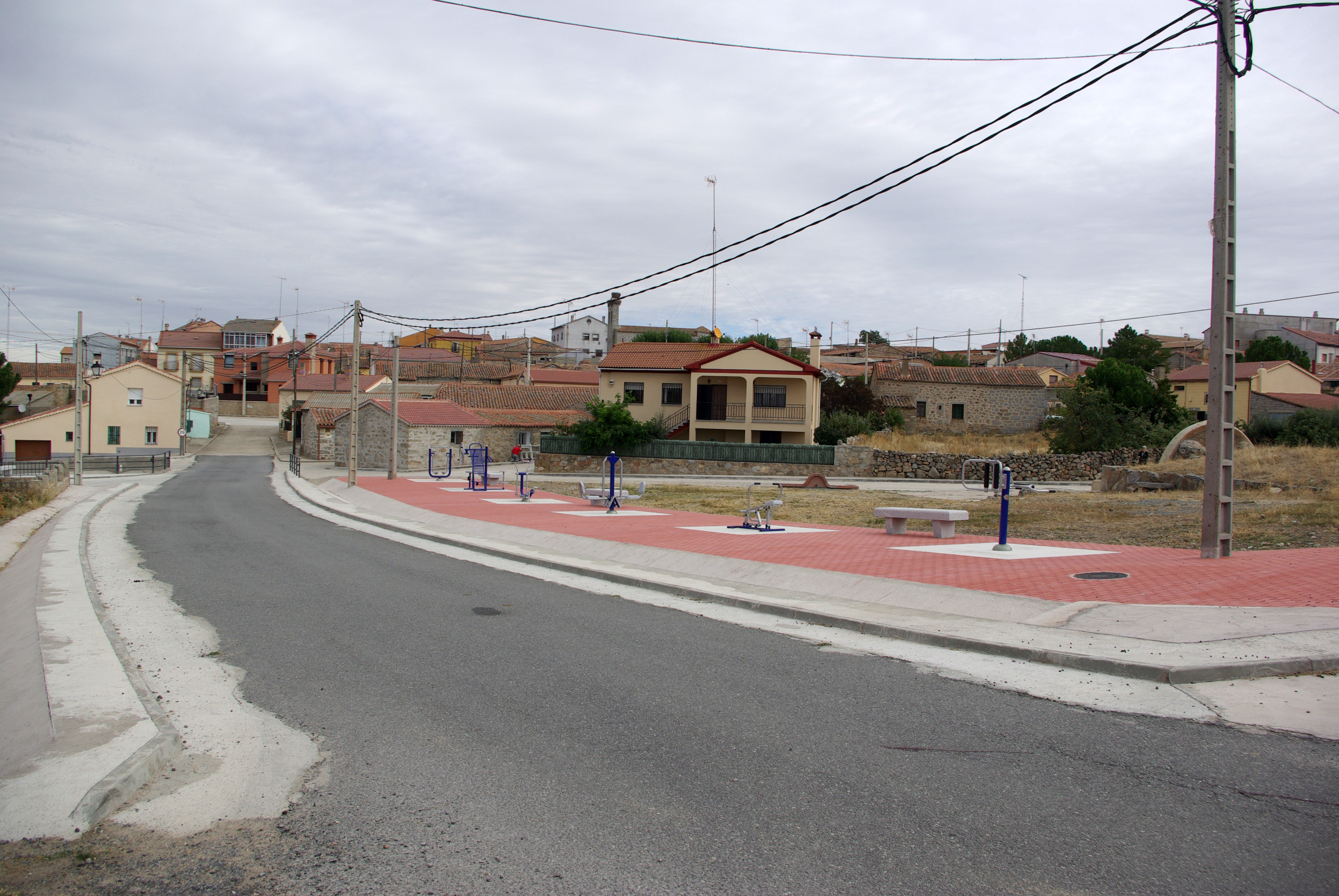

- Flag Coat of arms

- Extension of the municipal term within the province of Ávila

- Location in Spain. Berrocalejo de Aragona (Spain)
- Coordinates: 40°41′39″N 4°35′49″W
- Country: Spain
- Autonomous community: Castile and León
- Province: Ávila
- Municipality: Berrocalejo de Aragona

Area
  - Total: 9.01 km^{2} (3.48 sq mi)
- Elevation: 1,092 m (3,583 ft)

Population (2025-01-01)
  - Total: 55
  - Density: 6.1/km^{2} (16/sq mi)
- Time zone: UTC+1 (CET)
  - Summer (DST): UTC+2 (CEST)
- Website: Official website

Berrocalejo de Aragona is a municipality located in the province of Ávila, Castile and León, Spain. According to the 2025 census (INE), the municipality had a population of 55 inhabitants. The towns current economy is 80% Activity, 15% Constructive Activity, and 5% Establishments and Services The current mayor is Emilio Navas Arroyo. The small town is now attempting to make its presence known by others using its new website and "virtual town hall".

== Population ==
Historical population
| Year | Pop. | ±% p.a. |
|---|---|---|
| 2023 | 48 | — |
| 2024 | 56 | +16.67% |
| 2025 | 55 | −1.79% |
Source: INE
