= Blasconuño de Matacabras =

- municipality
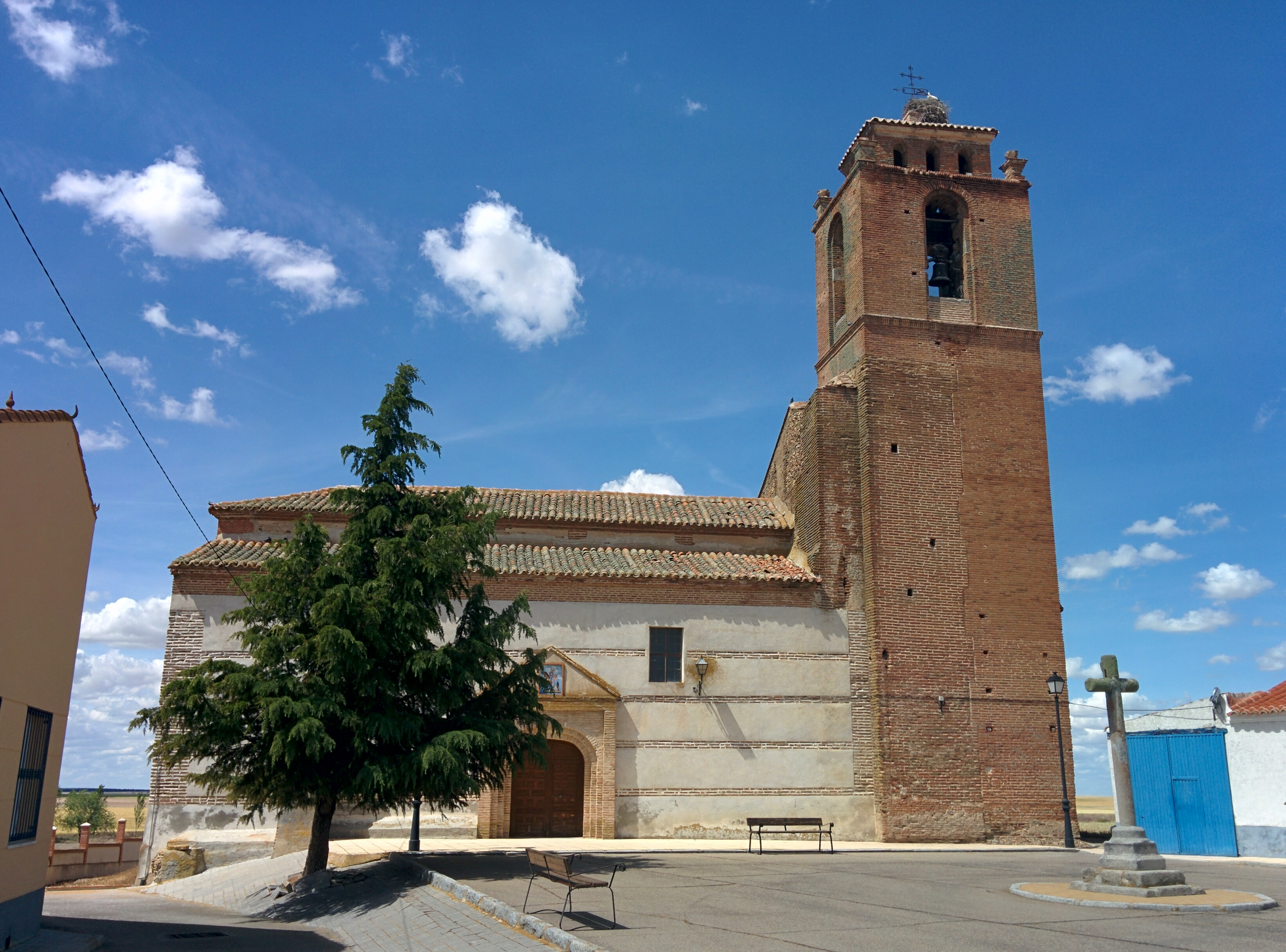
- Church of San Martín

- Extension of the municipal term within the province of Ávila

- Location in Spain. Blasconuño de Matacabras (Spain)
- Coordinates: 41°07′24″N 4°59′25″W
- Country: Spain
- Autonomous community: Castile and León
- Province: Ávila
- Municipality: Blasconuño de Matacabras

Area
  - Total: 12.99 km^{2} (5.02 sq mi)
- Elevation: 786 m (2,579 ft)

Population (2025-01-01)
  - Total: 14
  - Density: 1.1/km^{2} (2.8/sq mi)
- Time zone: UTC+1 (CET)
  - Summer (DST): UTC+2 (CEST)
- Website: Official website

Blasconuño de Matacabras (Spanish pronunciation: [blaskoˈnuɲo ðe mataˈkaβɾas]) is a municipality located in the province of Ávila, Castile and León, Spain.

== Population ==
Historical population
Year	Pop.	±% p.a.
2023	15	—
2024	14	−6.67%
2025	14	+0.00%
Source: INE
