= Vega de Santa María =

- municipality
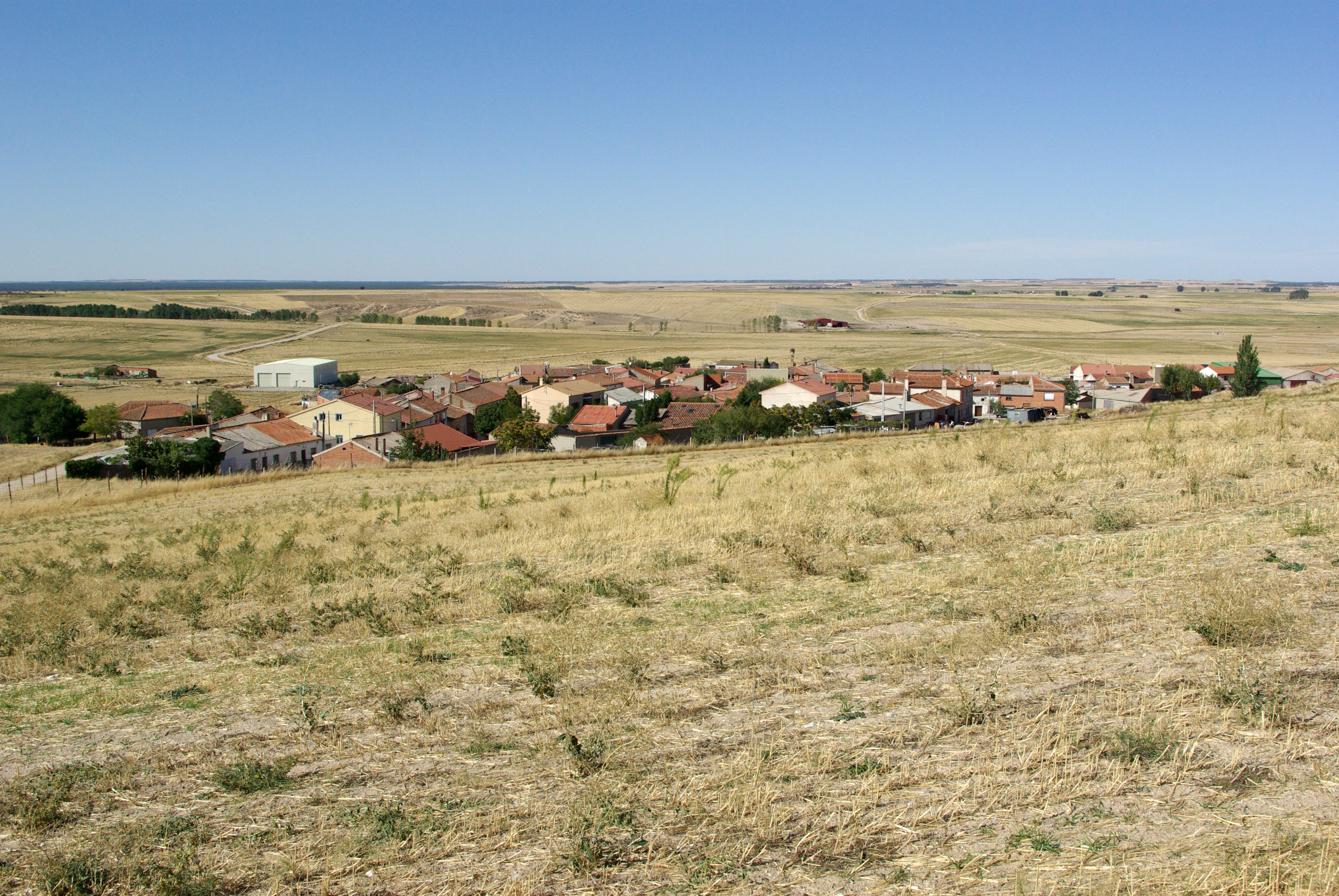
- View of Vega de Santa Maria

- Flag Coat of arms

- Location in Spain. Vega de Santa María (Spain)
- Coordinates: 40°50′09″N 4°38′31″W
- Country: Spain
- Autonomous community: Castile and León
- Province: Ávila
- Municipality: Vega de Santa María

Area
  - Total: 18 km^{2} (6.9 sq mi)

Population (2025-01-01)
  - Total: 88
  - Density: 4.9/km^{2} (13/sq mi)
- Time zone: UTC+1 (CET)
  - Summer (DST): UTC+2 (CEST)
- Website: Official website

Vega de Santa María is a municipality located in the province of Ávila, Castile and León, Spain.

The municipality is located at a distance about 90 km northwest of Madrid, 20 km north of Avila.

The most popular holidays are in honour of Nuestra Señora de la Asunción (Our lady of the Ascension – August 15) and Purísima Concepción (Immaculate conception – December 8).

== Population ==
Historical population
Year	Pop.	±% p.a.
2023	57	—
2024	56	−1.75%
2025	54	−3.57%
Source: INE
