= Bularros =

- municipality
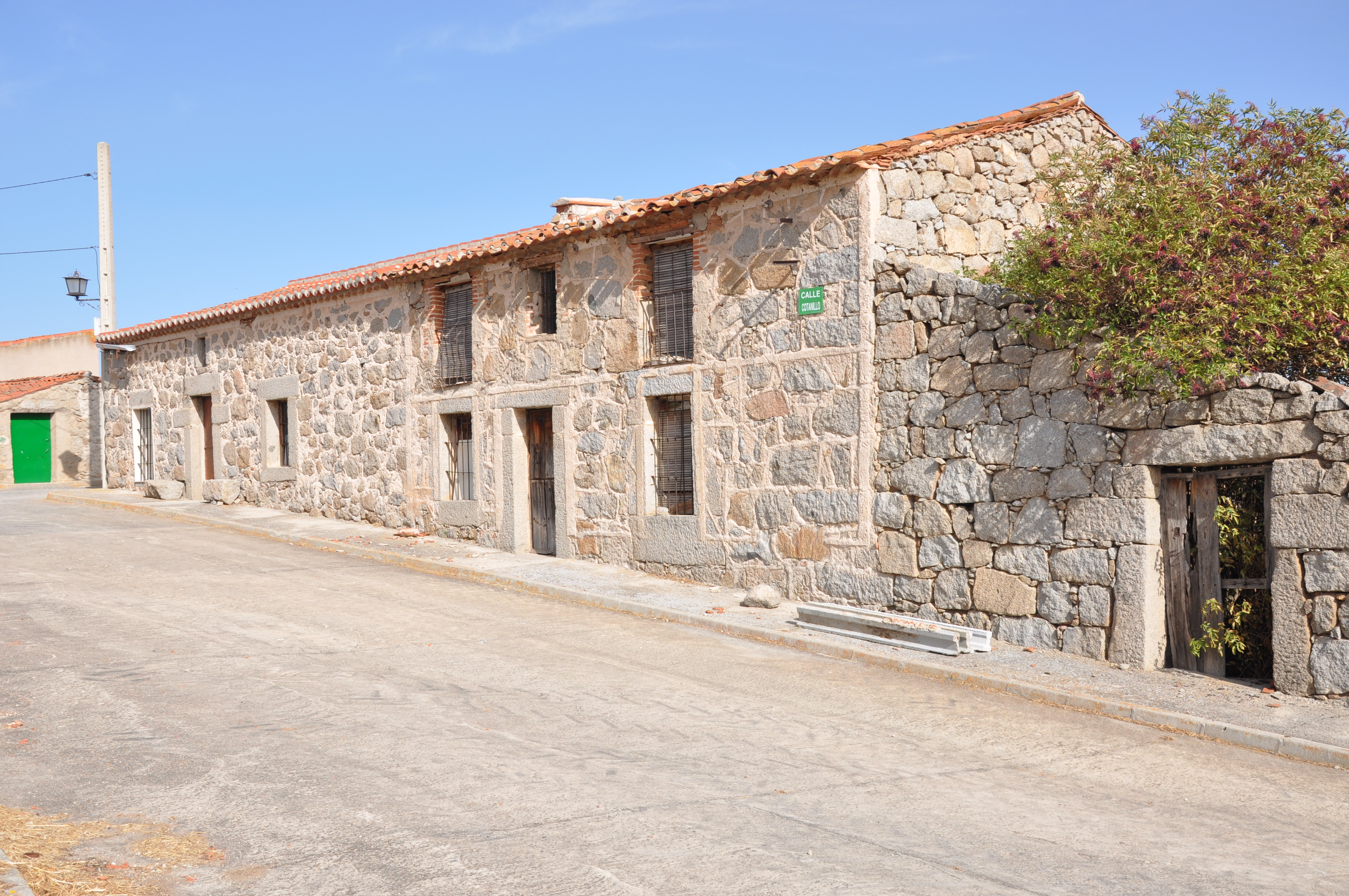

- Coat of arms

- Location in Spain. Bularros (Spain)
- Coordinates: 40°43′34″N 4°52′00″W
- Country: Spain
- Autonomous community: Castile and León
- Province: Ávila
- Municipality: Bularros

Area
  - Total: 30.76 km^{2} (11.88 sq mi)
- Elevation: 1,159 m (3,802 ft)

Population (2025-01-01)
  - Total: 55
  - Density: 1.8/km^{2} (4.6/sq mi)
- Time zone: UTC+1 (CET)
  - Summer (DST): UTC+2 (CEST)
- Website: Official website

Bularros is a municipality located in the province of Ávila, Castile and León, Spain. According to the 2005 census (INE), the municipality had a population of 96 inhabitants. By 2021, the INE reported that this had fallen to 63.

== Population ==
Historical population
Year	Pop.	±% p.a.
2021	63	—
2022	59	−6.35%
2023	57	−3.39%
2024	55	−3.51%
2025	55	+0.00%
Source: INE
