= Arevalillo =

- Municipality
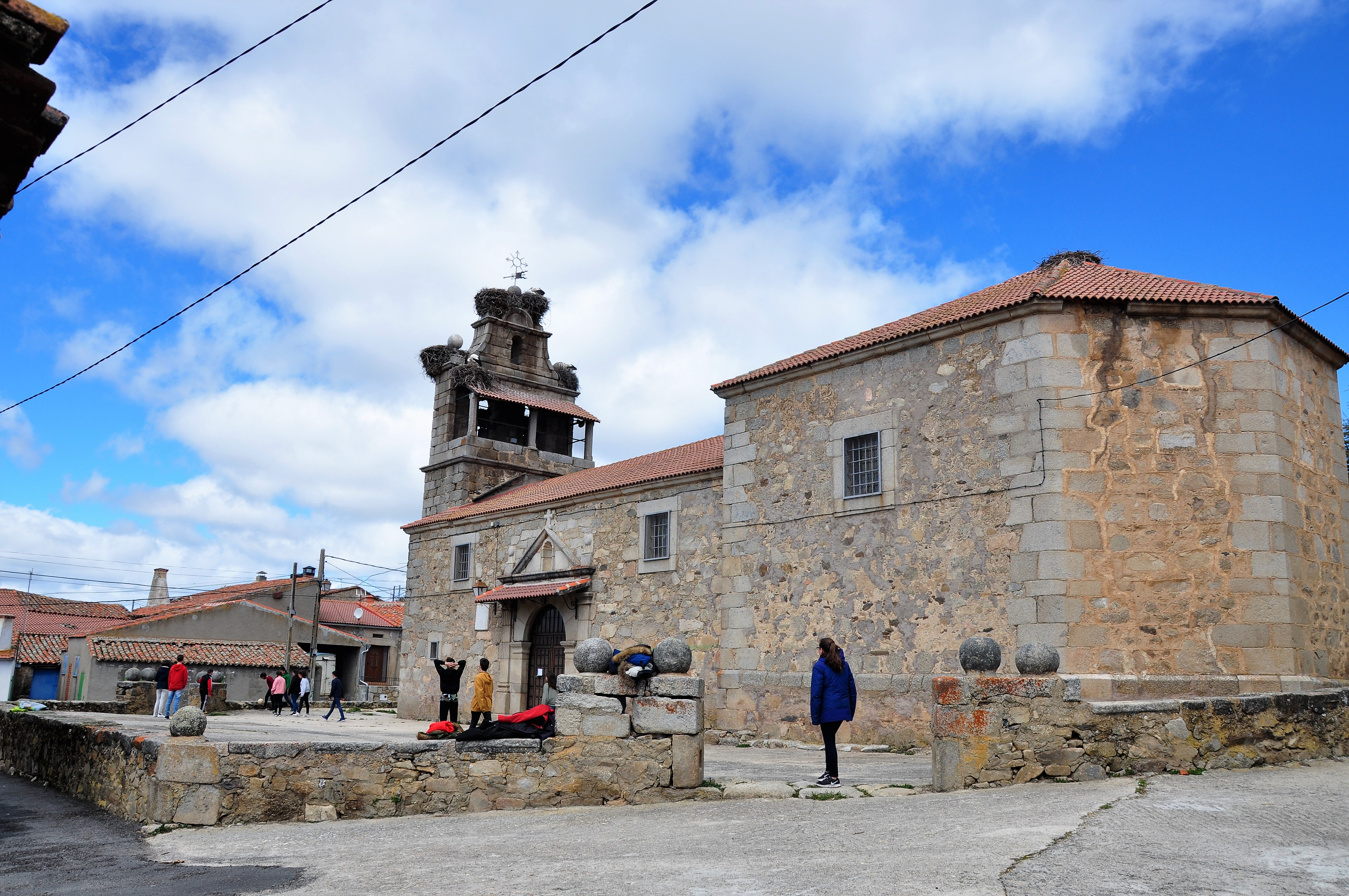
- Arevalillo church

- Flag Coat of arms

- Extension of the municipal term within the province of Ávila

- Location in Spain. Arevalillo (Spain)
- Coordinates: 40°35′14″N 5°22′28″W
- Country: Spain
- Autonomous community: Castile and León
- Province: Ávila
- Municipality: Arevalillo

Area
  - Total: 14.97 km^{2} (5.78 sq mi)
- Elevation: 1,130 m (3,710 ft)

Population (2025-01-01)
  - Total: 58
  - Density: 3.9/km^{2} (10/sq mi)
- Time zone: UTC+1 (CET)
  - Summer (DST): UTC+2 (CEST)
- Website: Official website

Arevalillo is a municipality located in the province of Ávila, Castile and León, Spain. According to the 2025 census (INE), the municipality had a population of 58 inhabitants.

== Population ==
Historical population
Year	Pop.	±% p.a.
2023	60	—
2024	58	−3.33%
2025	58	+0.00%
Source: INE
