= Cantiveros =

- municipality
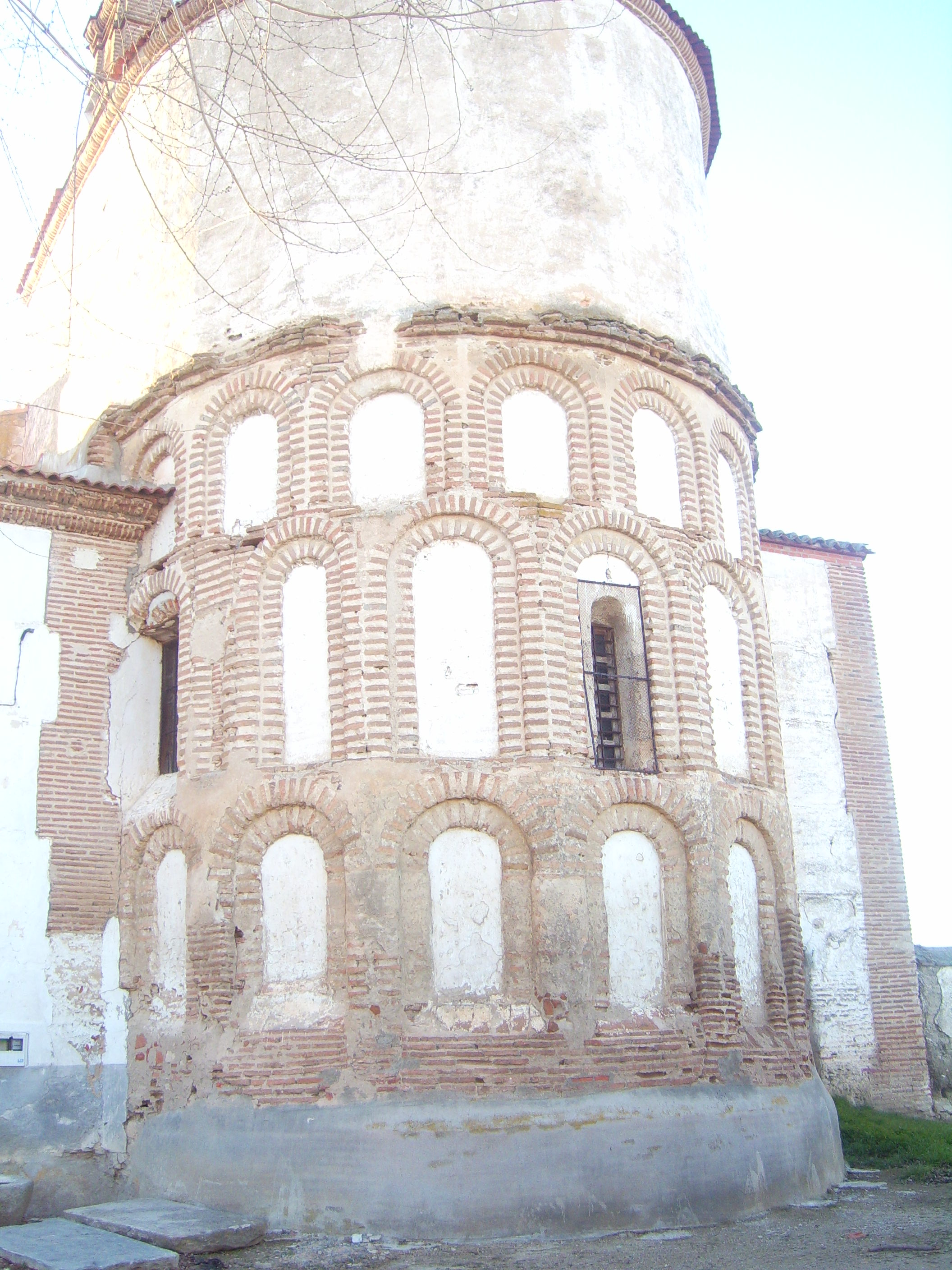
- Apse of the church of San Miguel Arcángel

- Flag Coat of arms

- Location in Spain. Cantiveros (Spain)
- Coordinates: 40°57′10″N 4°57′16″W
- Country: Spain
- Autonomous community: Castile and León
- Province: Ávila
- Municipality: Cantiveros

Area
  - Total: 14.37 km^{2} (5.55 sq mi)
- Elevation: 875 m (2,871 ft)

Population (2025-01-01)
  - Total: 102
  - Density: 7.10/km^{2} (18.4/sq mi)
- Time zone: UTC+1 (CET)
  - Summer (DST): UTC+2 (CEST)
- Website: Official website

Cantiveros is a municipality located in the province of Ávila, Castile and León, Spain. According to the 2006 census (INE), the municipality had a population of 176 inhabitants.

== Population ==
Historical population
Year	Pop.	±% p.a.
2023	97	—
2024	99	+2.06%
2025	102	+3.03%
Source: INE
