= San Juan de la Encinilla =

- municipality
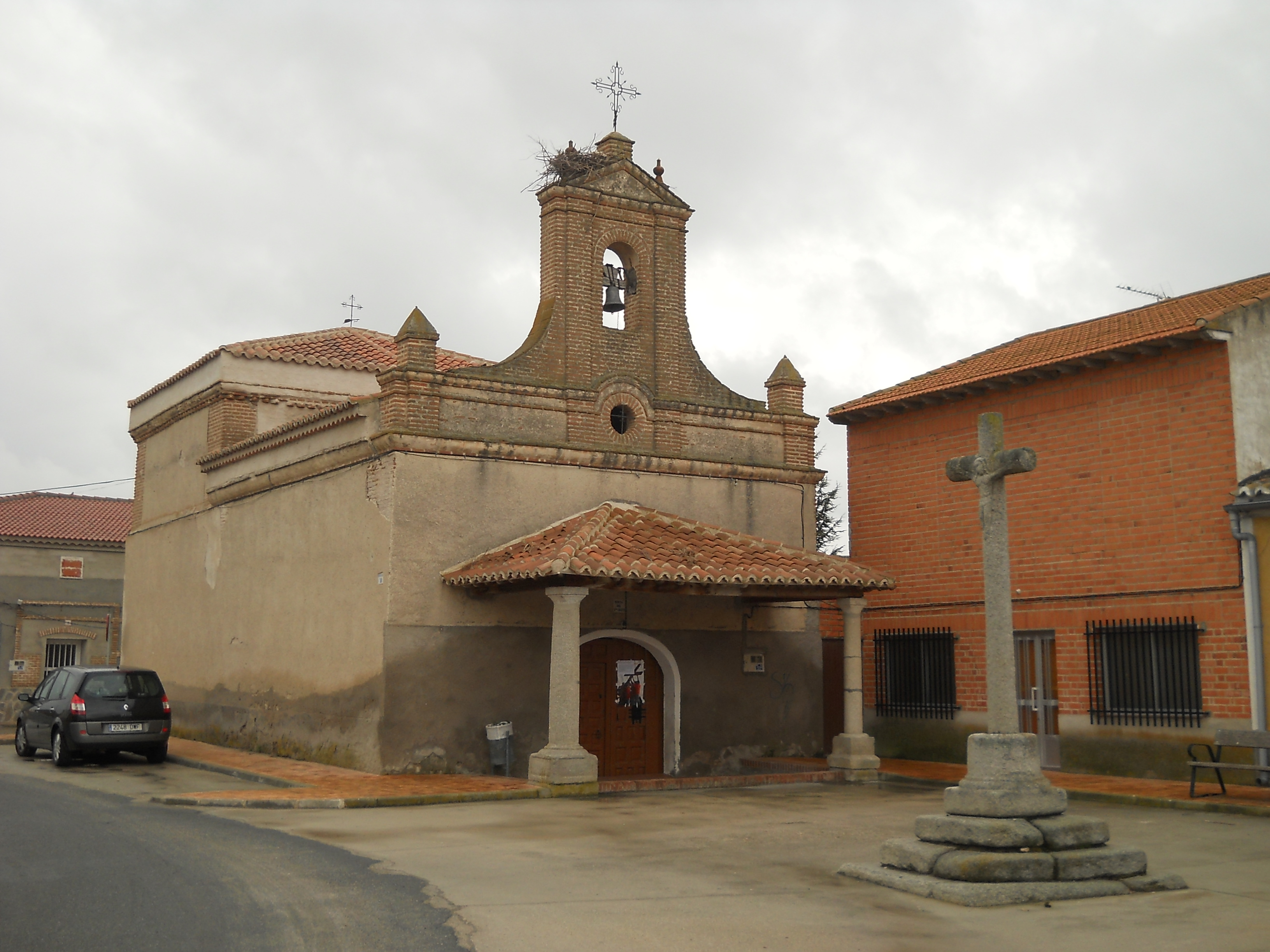
- Hermitage of Christ in San Juan de la Encinilla, Avila, Spain
- Flag Coat of arms
- Location in Spain. San Juan de la Encinilla (Spain)
- Coordinates: 40°49′48″N 4°50′18″W
- Country: Spain
- Autonomous community: Castile and León
- Province: Ávila
- Municipality: San Juan de la Encinilla

Area
  - Total: 17 km^{2} (6.6 sq mi)

Population (2025-01-01)
  - Total: 70
  - Density: 4.1/km^{2} (11/sq mi)
- Time zone: UTC+1 (CET)
  - Summer (DST): UTC+2 (CEST)
- Website: Official website

San Juan de la Encinilla is a municipality located in the province of Ávila, Castile and León, Spain.

== Population ==
Historical population
Year	Pop.	±% p.a.
2023	65	—
2024	70	+7.69%
2025	70	+0.00%
Source: INE
