= Hoyorredondo =

- municipality
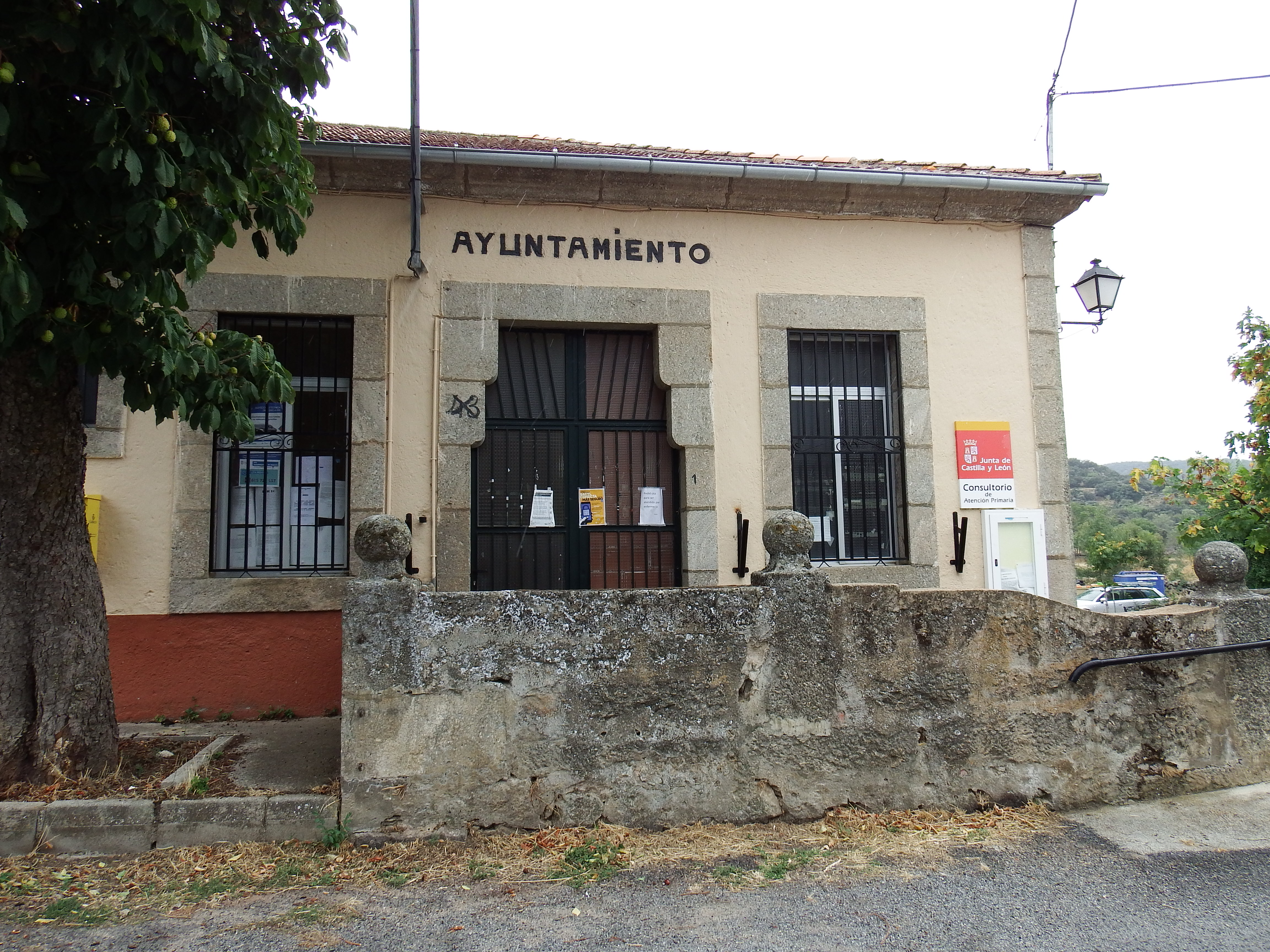
- Town hall

- Coat of arms

- Location in Spain. Hoyorredondo (Castile and León)
- Coordinates: 40°27′44″N 5°24′36″W
- Country: Spain
- Autonomous community: Castile and León
- Province: Ávila
- Municipality: Hoyorredondo

Area
  - Total: 17 km^{2} (6.6 sq mi)

Population (2025-01-01)
  - Total: 57
  - Density: 3.4/km^{2} (8.7/sq mi)
- Time zone: UTC+1 (CET)
  - Summer (DST): UTC+2 (CEST)
- Website: Official website

Hoyorredondo is a municipality located in the province of Ávila, Castile and León, Spain.

== Population ==
Historical population
| Year | Pop. | ±% p.a. |
|---|---|---|
| 2023 | 60 | — |
| 2024 | 59 | −1.67% |
| 2025 | 57 | −3.39% |
Source: INE
