= Pradosegar =

- municipality
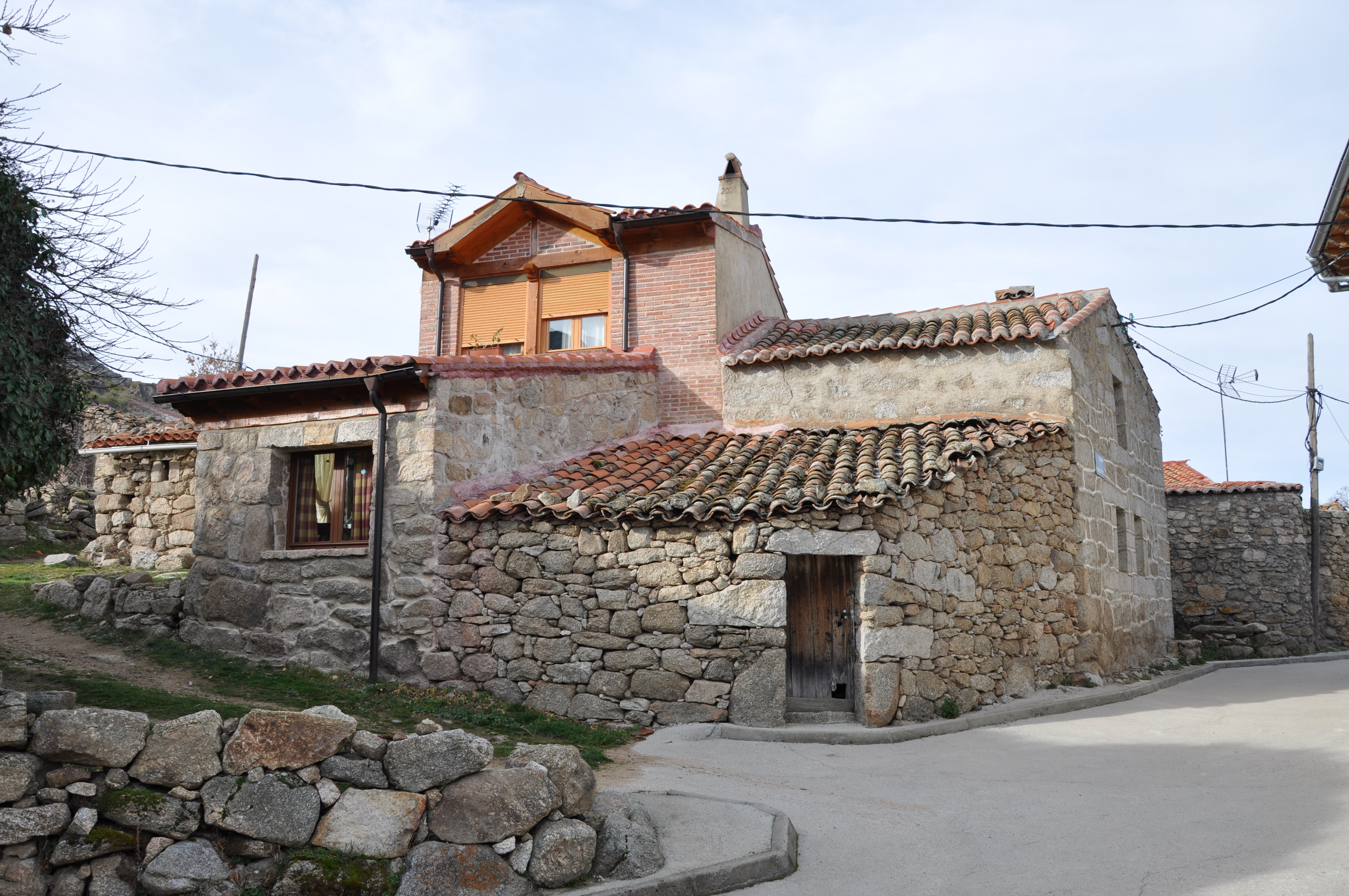
- House, Barrio de Arriba
- Flag Coat of arms
- Location in Spain. Pradosegar (Spain)
- Coordinates: 40°33′03″N 5°04′16″W
- Country: Spain
- Autonomous community: Castile and León
- Province: Ávila
- Municipality: Pradosegar

Area
  - Total: 11.29 km^{2} (4.36 sq mi)
- Elevation: 1,178 m (3,865 ft)

Population (2025-01-01)
  - Total: 109
  - Density: 9.65/km^{2} (25.0/sq mi)
- Time zone: UTC+1 (CET)
  - Summer (DST): UTC+2 (CEST)
- Website: Official website

Pradosegar is a municipality located in the province of Ávila, Castile and León, Spain.

== Population ==
Historical population
Year	Pop.	±% p.a.
2023	119	—
2024	117	−1.68%
2025	109	−6.84%
Source: INE
