= San Juan del Molinillo =

- municipality
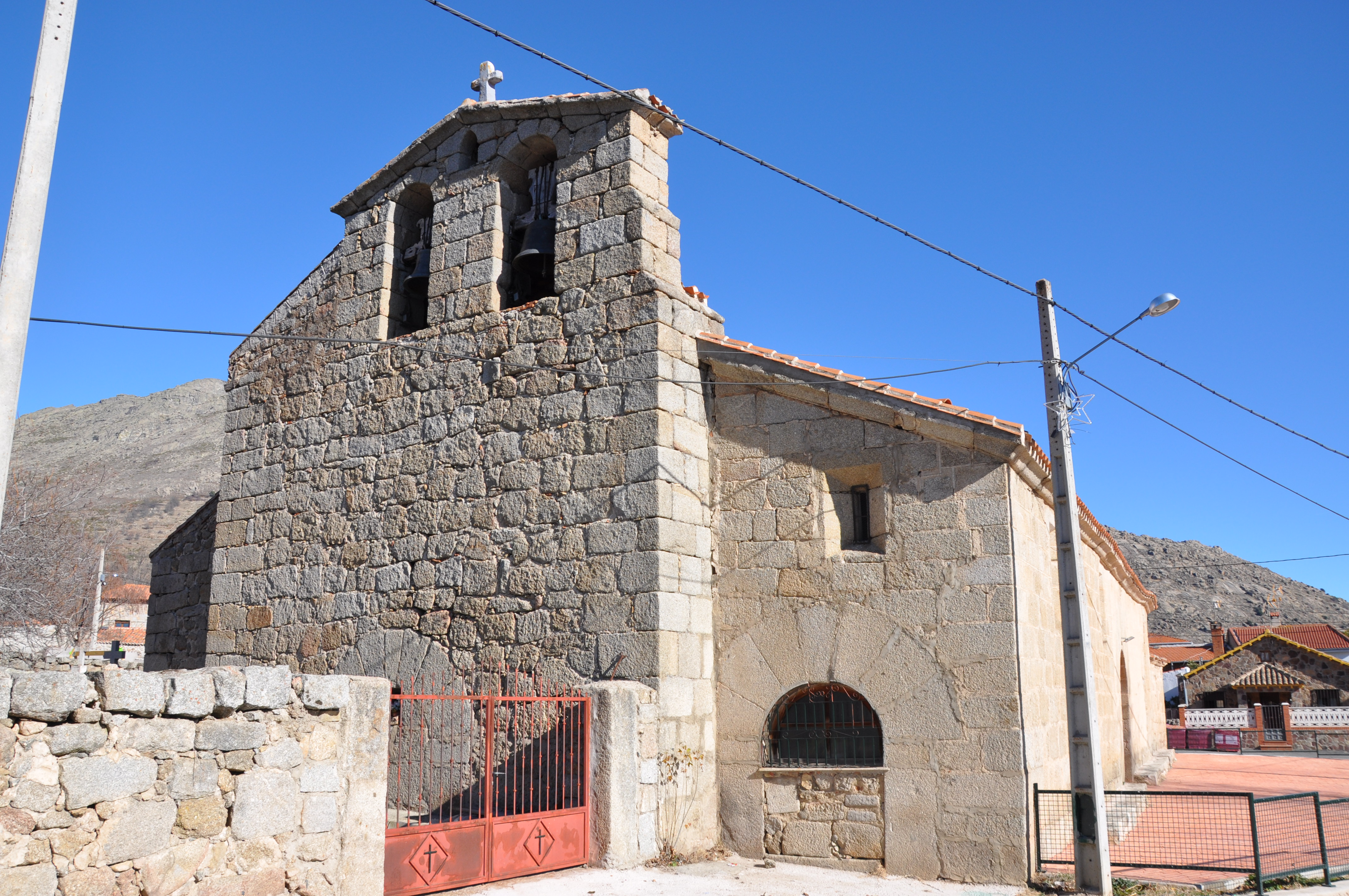
- Church of San Juan bautista, San Juan del Molinillo
- Flag Coat of arms
- Location in Spain. San Juan del Molinillo (Spain)
- Coordinates: 40°27′32″N 4°49′05″W
- Country: Spain
- Autonomous community: Castile and León
- Province: Ávila
- Municipality: San Juan del Molinillo

Area
  - Total: 35 km^{2} (14 sq mi)

Population (2025-01-01)
  - Total: 238
  - Density: 6.8/km^{2} (18/sq mi)
- Time zone: UTC+1 (CET)
  - Summer (DST): UTC+2 (CEST)
- Website: Official website

San Juan del Molinillo is a municipality located in the province of Ávila, Castile and León, Spain.

== Population ==
Historical population
Year	Pop.	±% p.a.
2023	234	—
2024	234	+0.00%
2025	238	+1.71%
Source: INE
