= Santa María del Berrocal =

- municipality
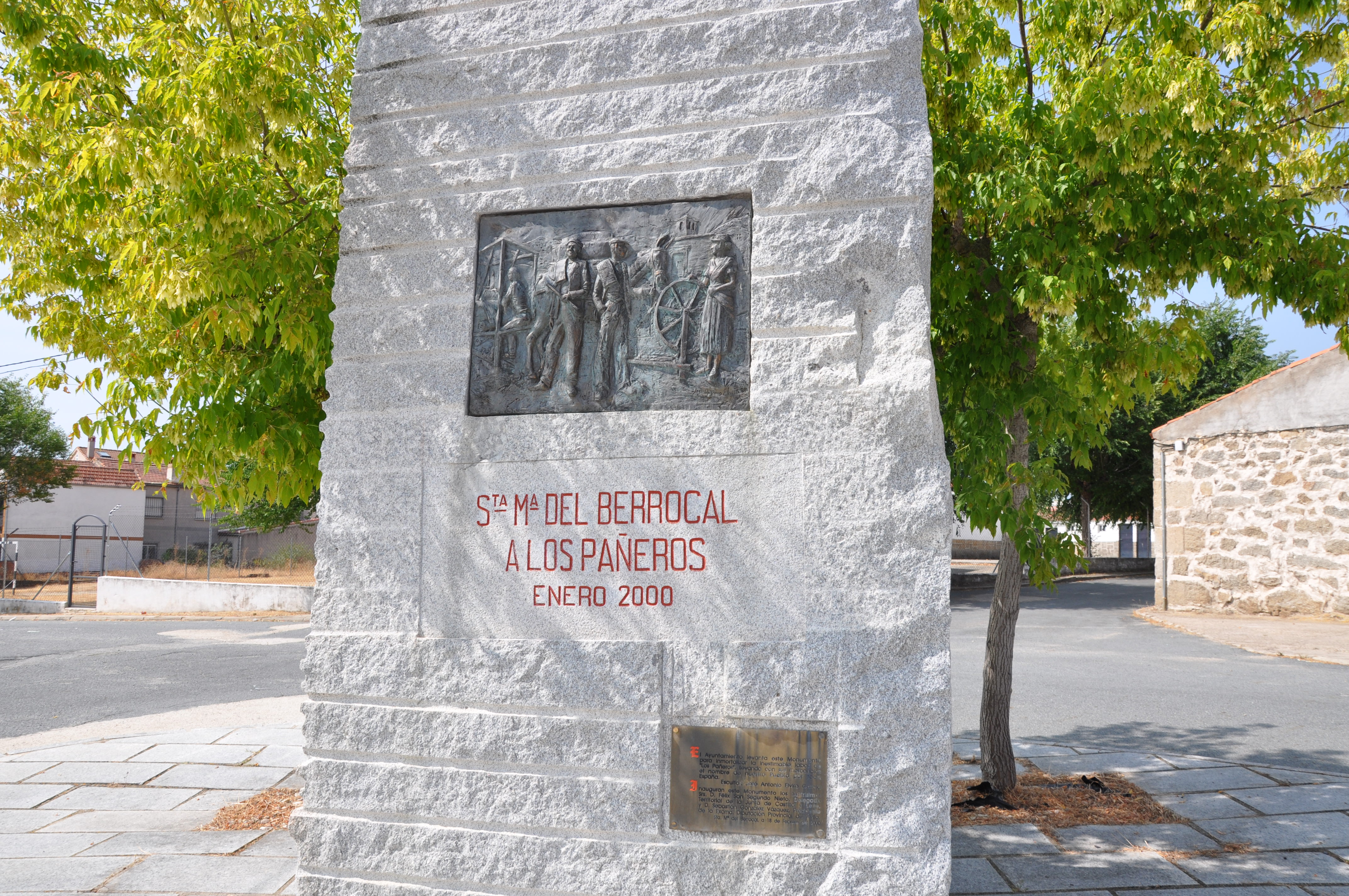
- Monument to the draper in Santa María del Berrocal

- Coat of arms

- Location in Spain. Santa María del Berrocal (Spain)
- Coordinates: 40°30′34″N 5°24′23″W
- Country: Spain
- Autonomous community: Castile and León
- Province: Ávila
- Municipality: Santa María del Berrocal

Area
  - Total: 28 km^{2} (11 sq mi)

Population (2025-01-01)
  - Total: 372
  - Density: 13/km^{2} (34/sq mi)
- Time zone: UTC+1 (CET)
  - Summer (DST): UTC+2 (CEST)
- Website: Official website

Santa María del Berrocal is a municipality located in the province of Ávila, Castile and León, Spain.

== Population ==
Historical population
Year	Pop.	±% p.a.
2023	374	—
2024	382	+2.14%
2025	372	−2.62%
Source: INE
