= Salvadiós =

- municipality
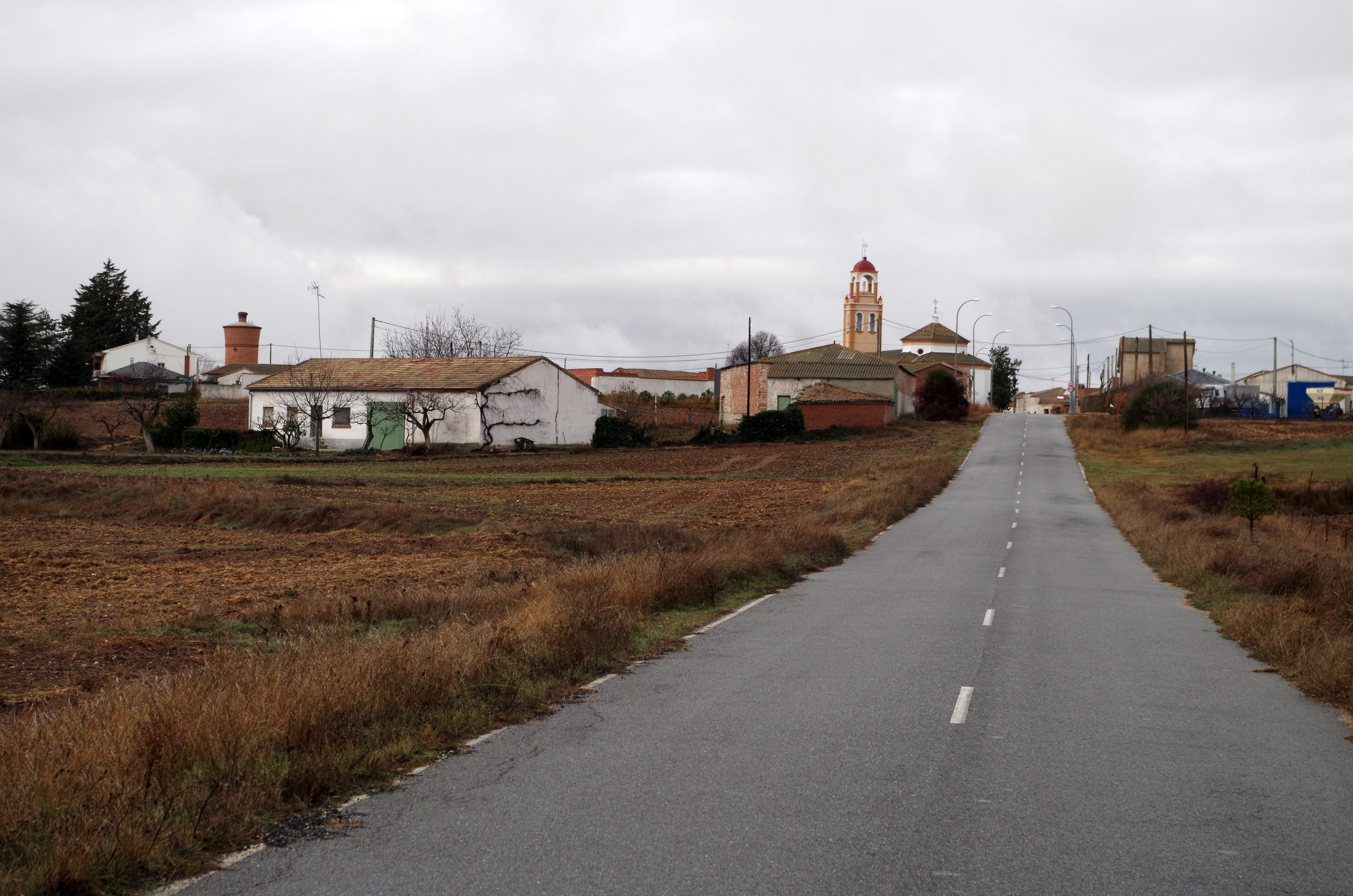
- Flag Coat of arms
- Location in Spain. Salvadiós (Spain)
- Coordinates: 40°52′37″N 5°05′47″W
- Country: Spain
- Autonomous community: Castile and León
- Province: Ávila
- Municipality: Salvadiós

Area
  - Total: 20 km^{2} (7.7 sq mi)

Population (2025-01-01)
  - Total: 67
  - Density: 3.4/km^{2} (8.7/sq mi)
- Time zone: UTC+1 (CET)
  - Summer (DST): UTC+2 (CEST)
- Website: Official website

Salvadiós (Spanish pronunciation: [salβaˈðjos]) is a municipality located in the province of Ávila, Castile and León, Spain.

== Population ==
Historical population
Year	Pop.	±% p.a.
2023	77	—
2024	71	−7.79%
2025	67	−5.63%
Source: INE
