= Fresnedilla =

- municipality
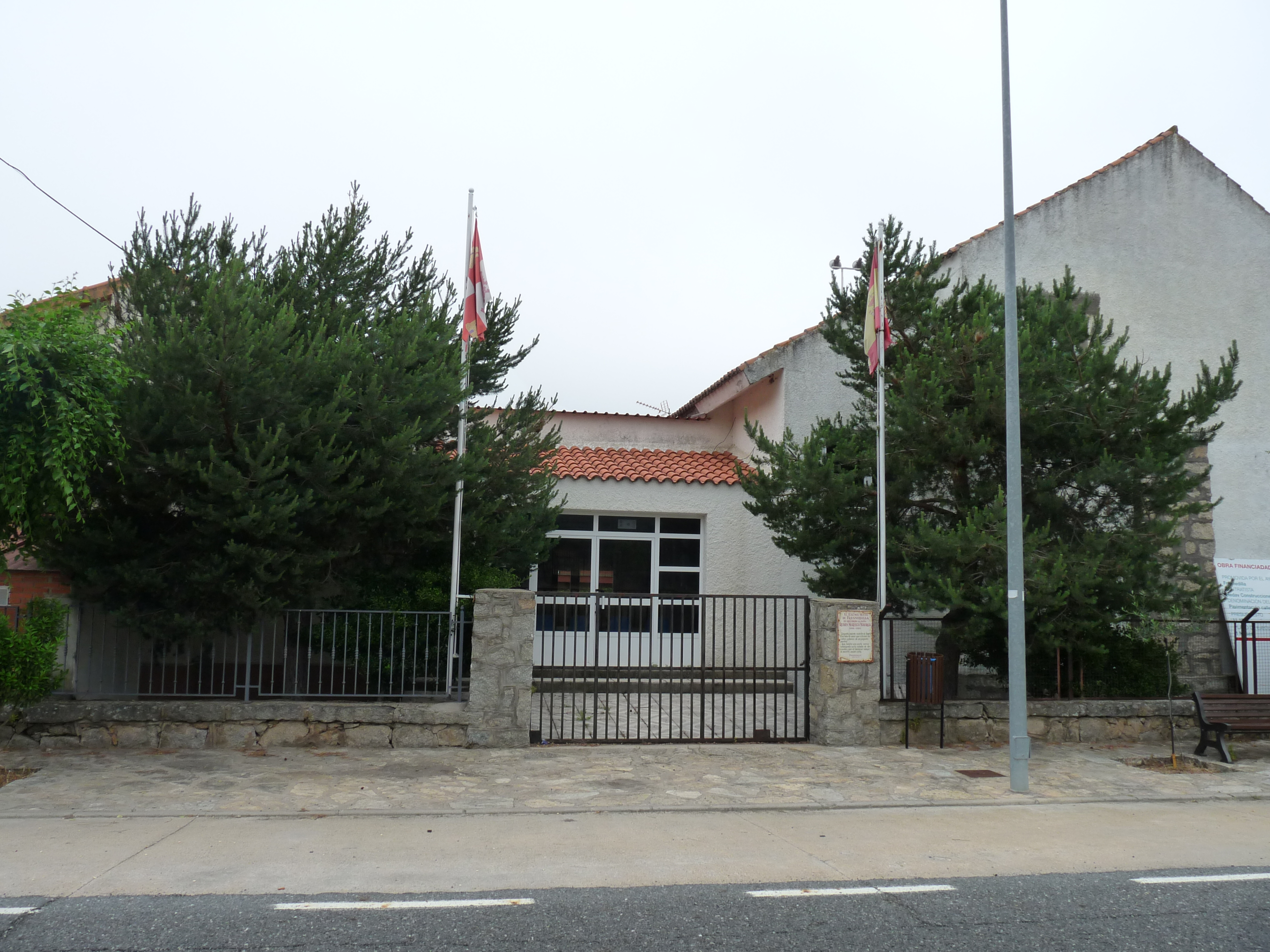
- Fresnedilla Town Hall
- Flag Coat of arms
- Location in Spain. Fresnedilla (Spain)
- Coordinates: 40°14′01″N 4°37′14″W
- Country: Spain
- Autonomous community: Castile and León
- Province: Ávila

Area
  - Total: 24.53 km^{2} (9.47 sq mi)
- Elevation: 622 m (2,041 ft)

Population (2025-01-01)
  - Total: 92
  - Density: 3.8/km^{2} (9.7/sq mi)
- Time zone: UTC+1 (CET)
  - Summer (DST): UTC+2 (CEST)
- Website: Official website

Fresnedilla is a municipality located in the province of Ávila, Castile and León, Spain.

== Population ==
Historical population
Year	Pop.	±% p.a.
2023	106	—
2024	97	−8.49%
2025	92	−5.15%
Source: INE
