= Muñana =

- municipality
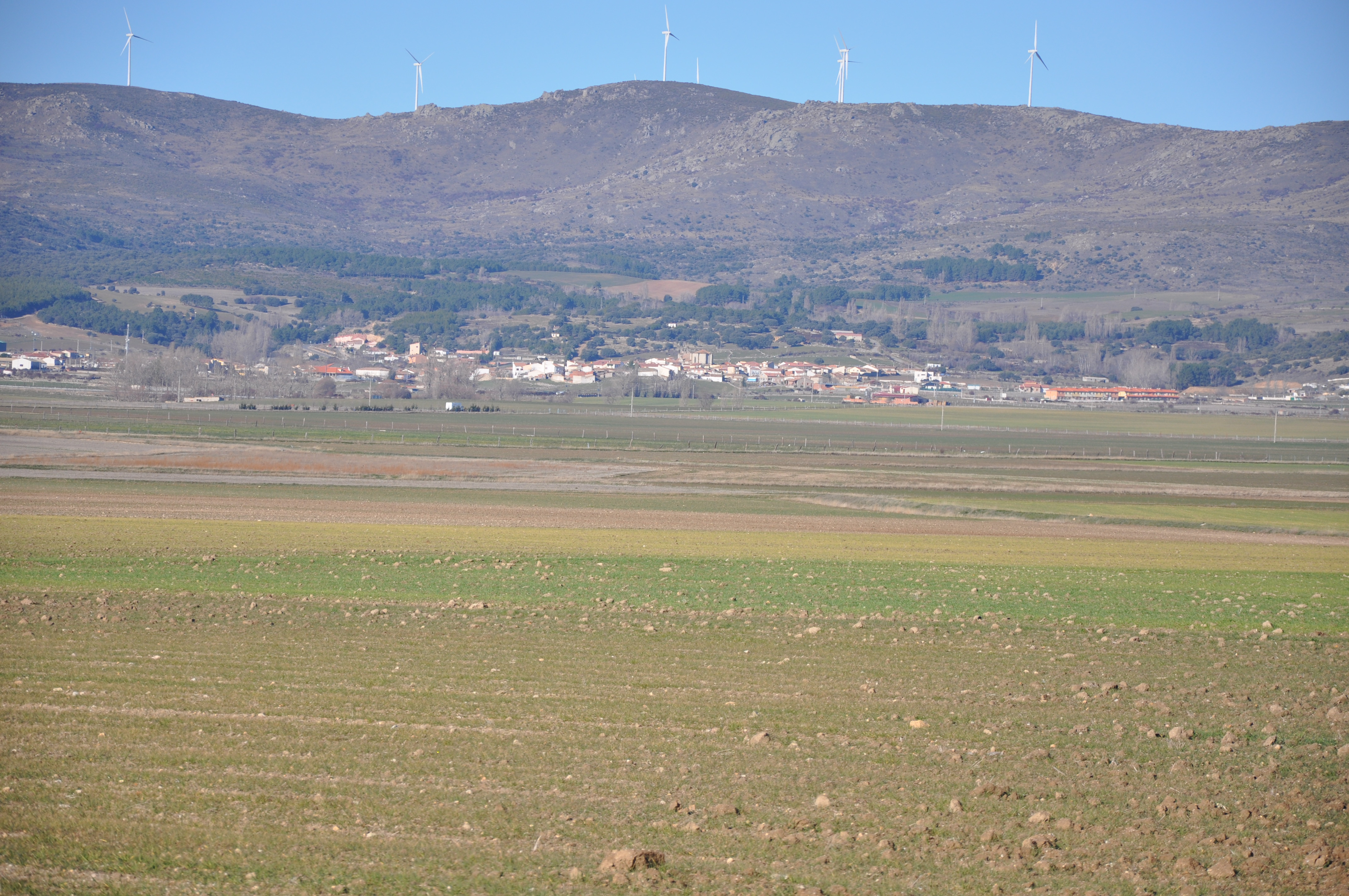
- Muñana

- Flag Coat of arms

- Location in Spain. Muñana (Spain)
- Coordinates: 40°35′26″N 5°00′52″W
- Country: Spain
- Autonomous community: Castile and León
- Province: Ávila
- Municipality: Muñana

Area
  - Total: 33 km^{2} (13 sq mi)

Population (2025-01-01)
  - Total: 499
  - Density: 15/km^{2} (39/sq mi)
- Time zone: UTC+1 (CET)
  - Summer (DST): UTC+2 (CEST)
- Website: Official website

Muñana is a municipality located in the province of Ávila, Castile and León, Spain.

== Population ==
Historical population
| Year | Pop. | ±% p.a. |
|---|---|---|
| 2023 | 483 | — |
| 2024 | 502 | +3.93% |
| 2025 | 499 | −0.60% |
Source: INE
