= Santa Cruz de Pinares =

- municipality
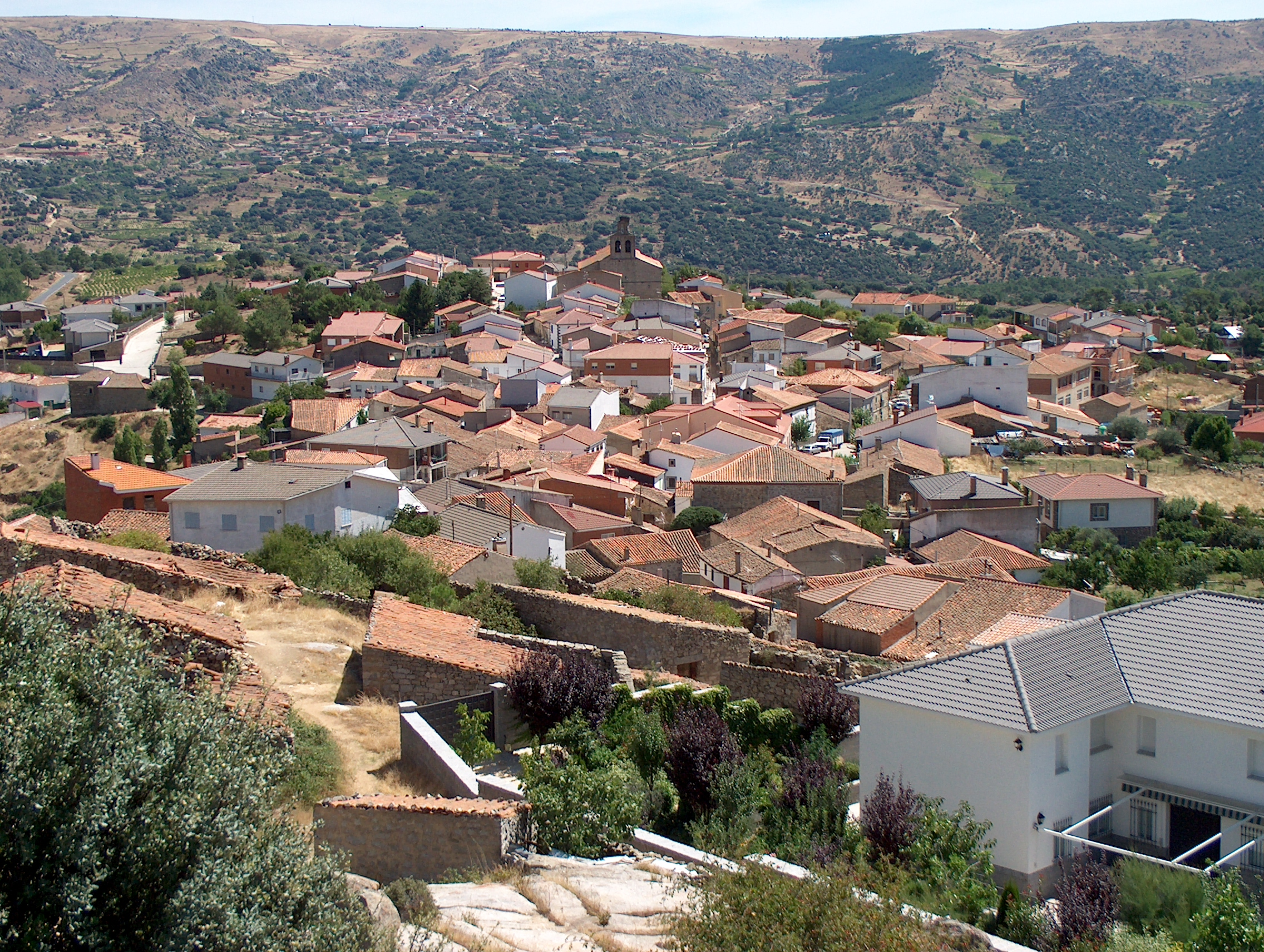
- View of Santa Cruz de Pinares

- Flag Coat of arms

- Location in Spain. Santa Cruz de Pinares (Spain)
- Coordinates: 40°32′31″N 4°34′46″W
- Country: Spain
- Autonomous community: Castile and León
- Province: Ávila

Area
  - Total: 41 km^{2} (16 sq mi)

Population (2025-01-01)
  - Total: 169
  - Density: 4.1/km^{2} (11/sq mi)
- Time zone: UTC+1 (CET)
  - Summer (DST): UTC+2 (CEST)
- Website: Official website

Santa Cruz de Pinares is a municipality located in the province of Ávila, Castile and León, Spain.

== Population ==
Historical population
Year	Pop.	±% p.a.
2023	172	—
2024	170	−1.16%
2025	169	−0.59%
Source: INE
