= Navarredondilla =

- municipality
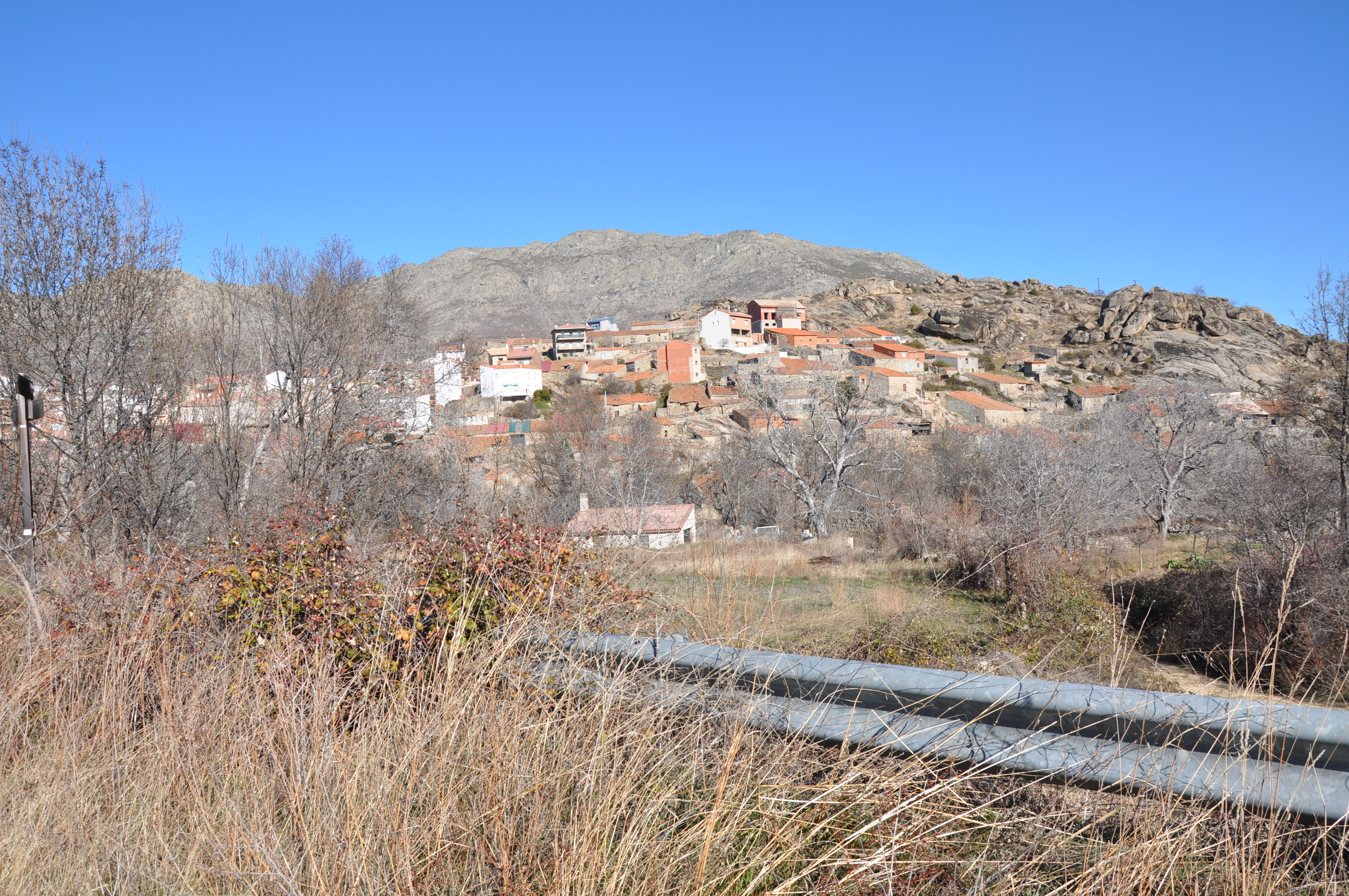
- Panorama
- Flag Coat of arms
- Location in Spain. Navarredondilla (Spain)
- Coordinates: 40°27′13″N 4°49′17″W
- Country: Spain
- Autonomous community: Castile and León
- Province: Ávila
- Municipality: Navarredondilla

Area
  - Total: 20 km^{2} (7.7 sq mi)

Population (2025-01-01)
  - Total: 146
  - Density: 7.3/km^{2} (19/sq mi)
- Time zone: UTC+1 (CET)
  - Summer (DST): UTC+2 (CEST)
- Website: Official website

Navarredondilla is a municipality located in the province of Ávila, Castile and León, Spain.

== Population ==
Historical population
Year	Pop.	±% p.a.
2023	179	—
2024	158	−11.73%
2025	146	−7.59%
Source: INE
