= Viñegra de Moraña =

- municipality
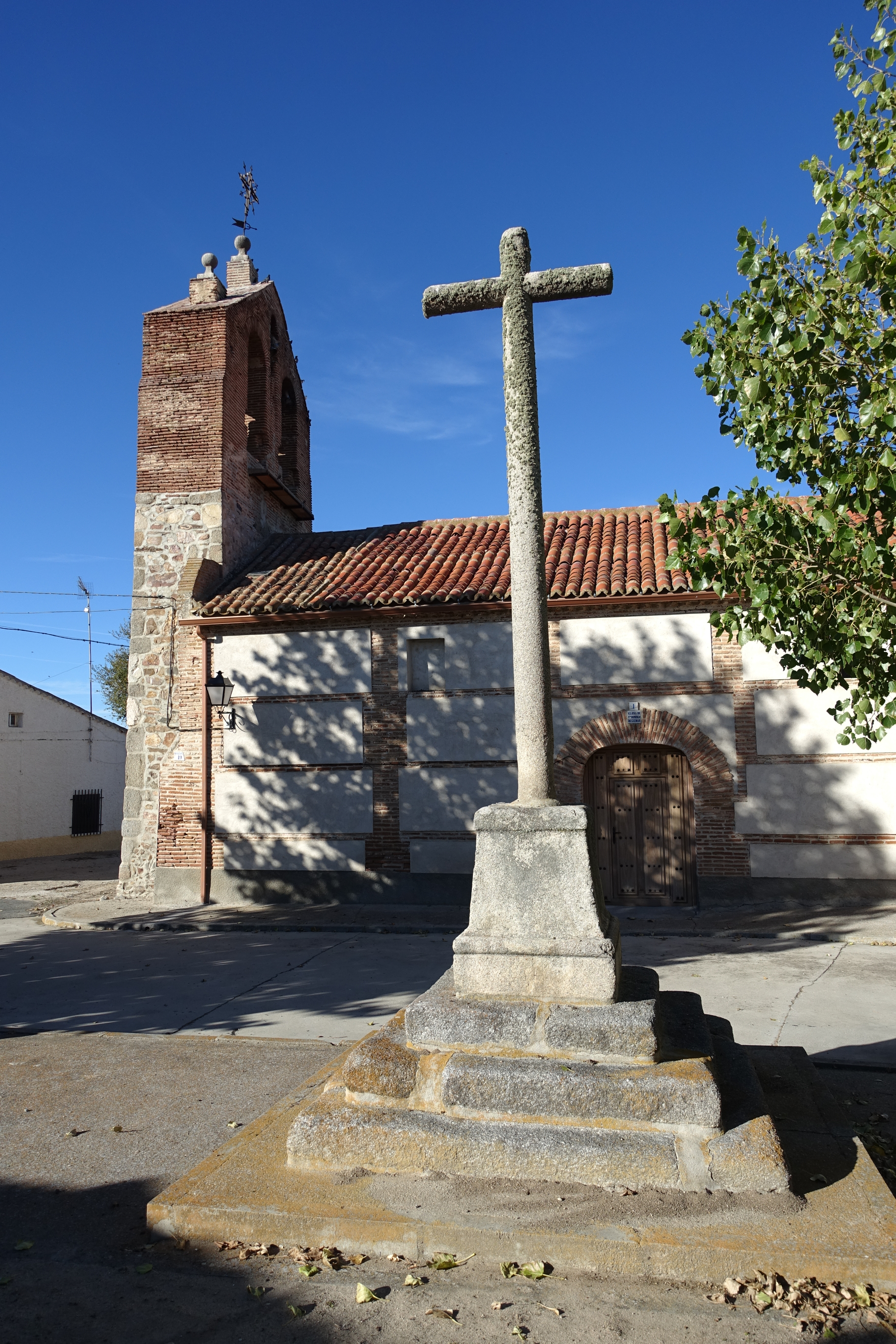
- Church of Santo Domingo de Guzmán, in Viñegra de Moraña

- Location in Spain. Viñegra de Moraña (Spain)
- Coordinates: 40°50′57″N 4°55′20″W
- Country: Spain
- Autonomous community: Castile and León
- Province: Ávila

Area
  - Total: 10.19 km^{2} (3.93 sq mi)
- Elevation: 903 m (2,963 ft)

Population (2025-01-01)
  - Total: 49
  - Density: 4.8/km^{2} (12/sq mi)
- Time zone: UTC+1 (CET)
  - Summer (DST): UTC+2 (CEST)
- Website: Official website

Viñegra de Moraña is a municipality located in the province of Ávila, Castile and León, Spain.

== Population ==
Historical population
Year	Pop.	±% p.a.
2023	47	—
2024	48	+2.13%
2025	49	+2.08%
Source: INE
