= Muñogrande =

- municipality
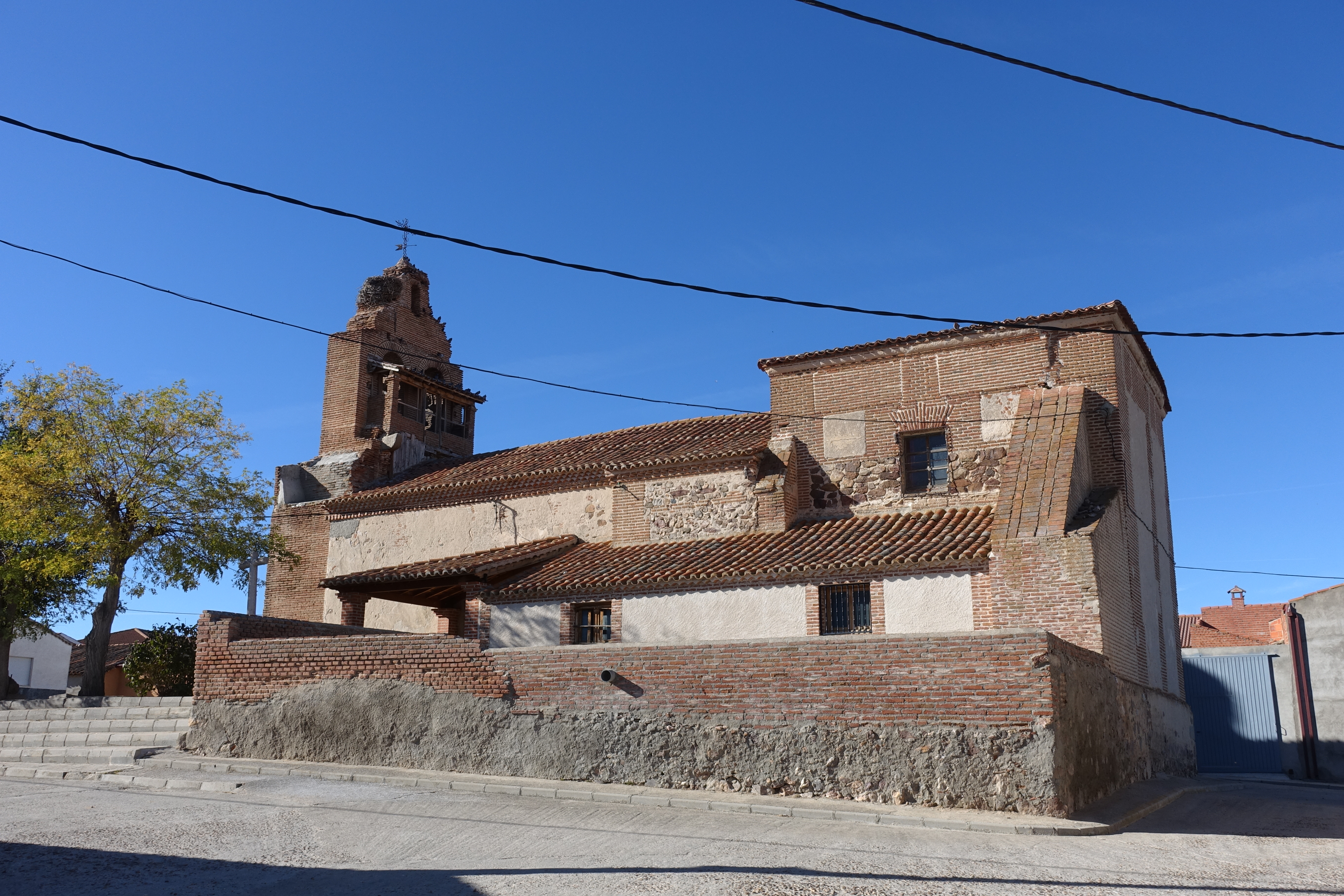
- Church of San Andrés Apóstol
- Flag Coat of arms
- Location in Spain. Muñogrande (Spain)
- Coordinates: 40°49′16″N 4°55′19″W
- Country: Spain
- Autonomous community: Castile and León
- Province: Ávila
- Municipality: Muñogrande

Area
  - Total: 16 km^{2} (6.2 sq mi)

Population (2025-01-01)
  - Total: 76
  - Density: 4.8/km^{2} (12/sq mi)
- Time zone: UTC+1 (CET)
  - Summer (DST): UTC+2 (CEST)
- Website: Official website

Muñogrande is a municipality located in the province of Ávila, Castile and León, Spain.

== Population ==
Historical population
Year	Pop.	±% p.a.
2023	71	—
2024	74	+4.23%
2025	76	+2.70%
Source: INE
