= Papatrigo =

- municipality
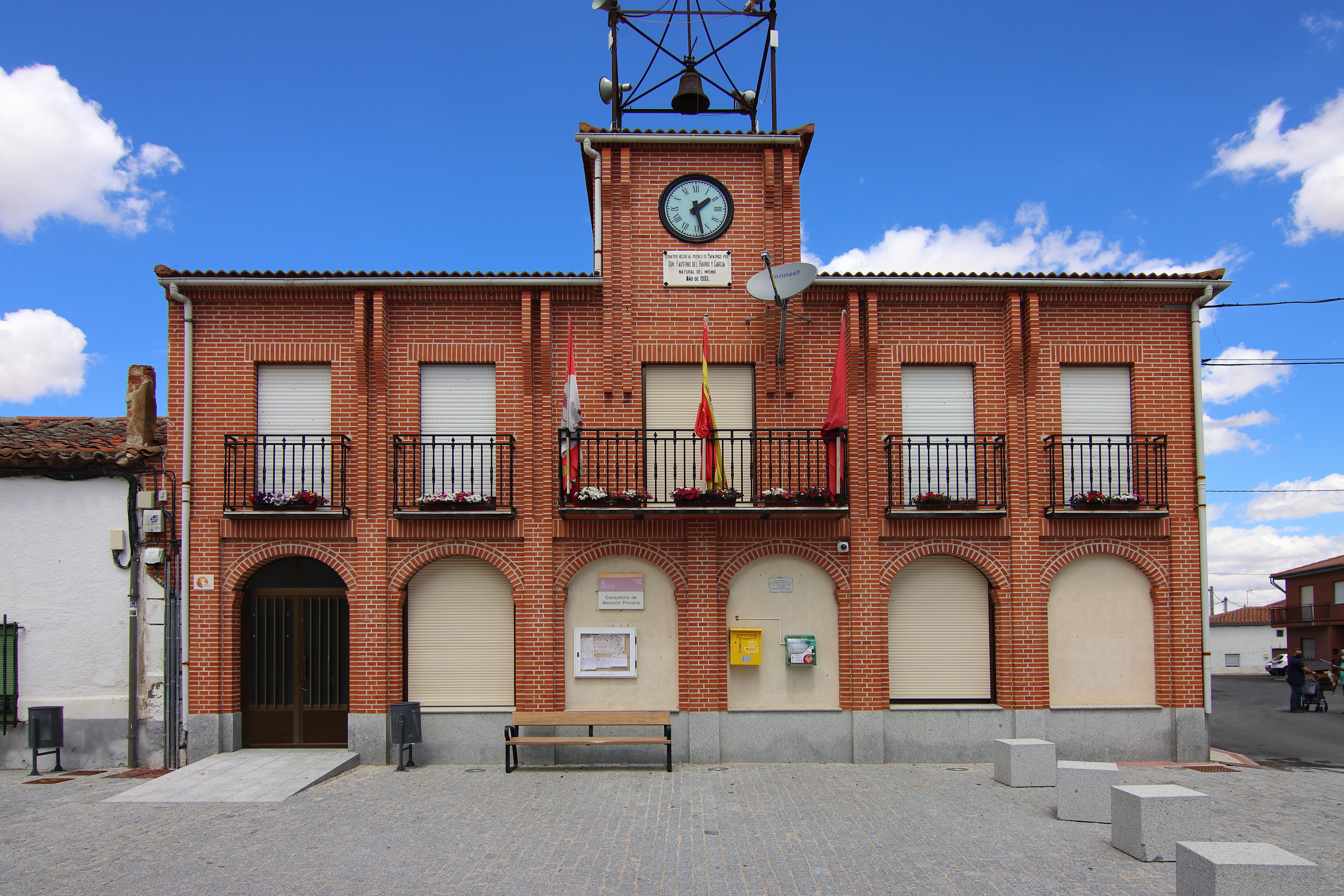
- Town hall
- Flag Coat of arms
- Location in Spain. Papatrigo (Spain)
- Coordinates: 40°52′02″N 4°49′55″W
- Country: Spain
- Autonomous community: Castile and León
- Province: Ávila
- Municipality: Papatrigo

Area
  - Total: 21 km^{2} (8.1 sq mi)

Population (2025-01-01)
  - Total: 215
  - Density: 10/km^{2} (27/sq mi)
- Time zone: UTC+1 (CET)
  - Summer (DST): UTC+2 (CEST)
- Website: Official website

Papatrigo is a municipality located in the province of Ávila, Castile and León, Spain.

== Population ==
Historical population
Year	Pop.	±% p.a.
2023	221	—
2024	219	−0.90%
2025	215	−1.83%
Source: INE
