= Riocabado =

- municipality
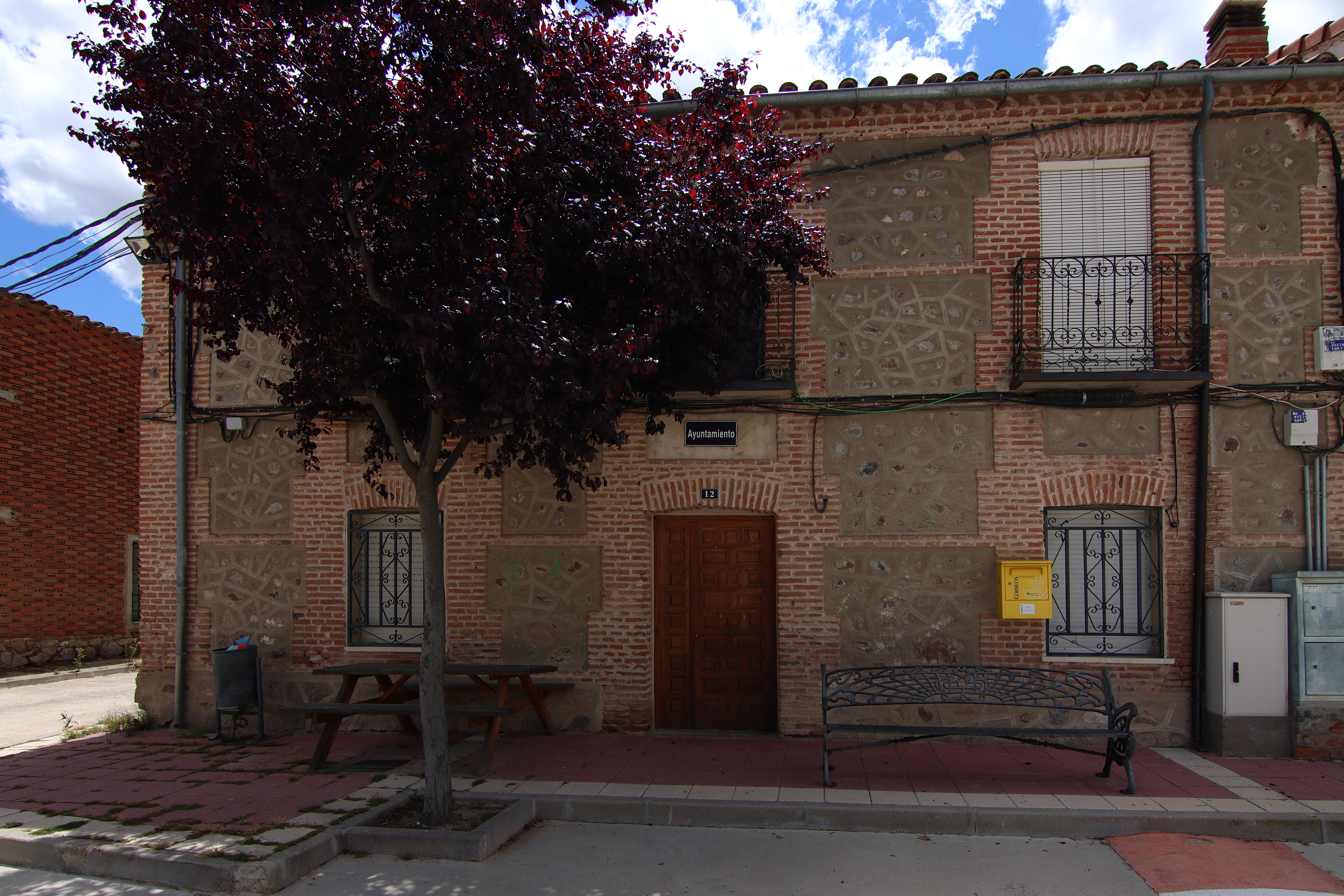
- Town hall

- Flag Coat of arms

- Location in Spain. Riocabado (Spain)
- Coordinates: 40°49′48″N 4°48′11″W
- Country: Spain
- Autonomous community: Castile and León
- Province: Ávila
- Municipality: Riocabado

Area
  - Total: 19 km^{2} (7.3 sq mi)

Population (2025-01-01)
  - Total: 129
  - Density: 6.8/km^{2} (18/sq mi)
- Time zone: UTC+1 (CET)
  - Summer (DST): UTC+2 (CEST)
- Website: Official website

Riocabado is a municipality located in the province of Ávila, Castile and León, Spain.

== Population ==
Historical population
Year	Pop.	±% p.a.
2023	131	—
2024	125	−4.58%
2025	129	+3.20%
Source: INE
