= Sinlabajos =

- municipality
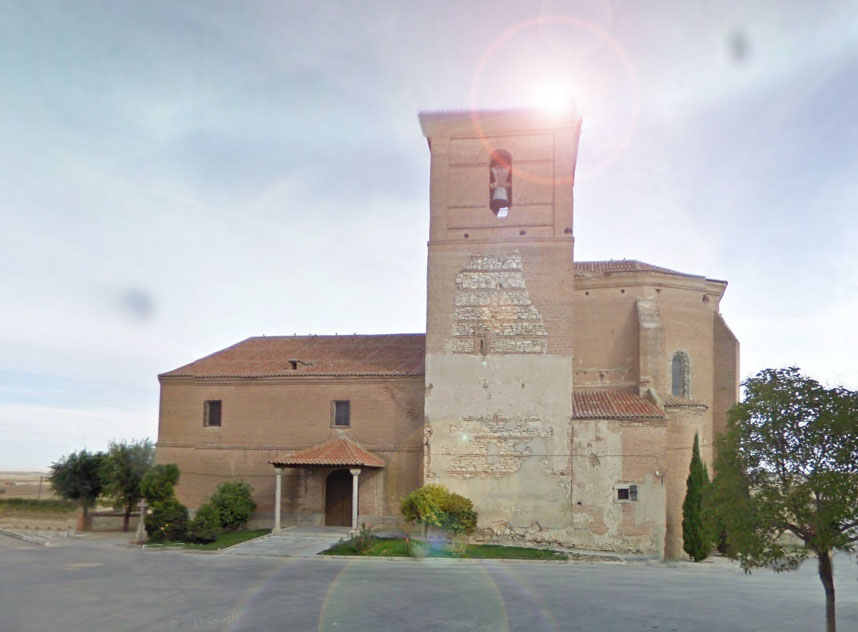
- Church of San Pelayo

- Flag Coat of arms

- Location in Spain. Sinlabajos (Spain)
- Coordinates: 41°04′38″N 4°49′55″W
- Country: Spain
- Autonomous community: Castile and León
- Province: Ávila
- Municipality: Sinlabajos

Area
  - Total: 20 km^{2} (7.7 sq mi)

Population (2025-01-01)
  - Total: 134
  - Density: 6.7/km^{2} (17/sq mi)
- Time zone: UTC+1 (CET)
  - Summer (DST): UTC+2 (CEST)
- Website: Official website

Sinlabajos is a municipality located in the province of Ávila, Castile and León, Spain.

== Population ==
Historical population
Year	Pop.	±% p.a.
2023	136	—
2024	135	−0.74%
2025	134	−0.74%
Source: INE
