= Muñopepe =

- municipality
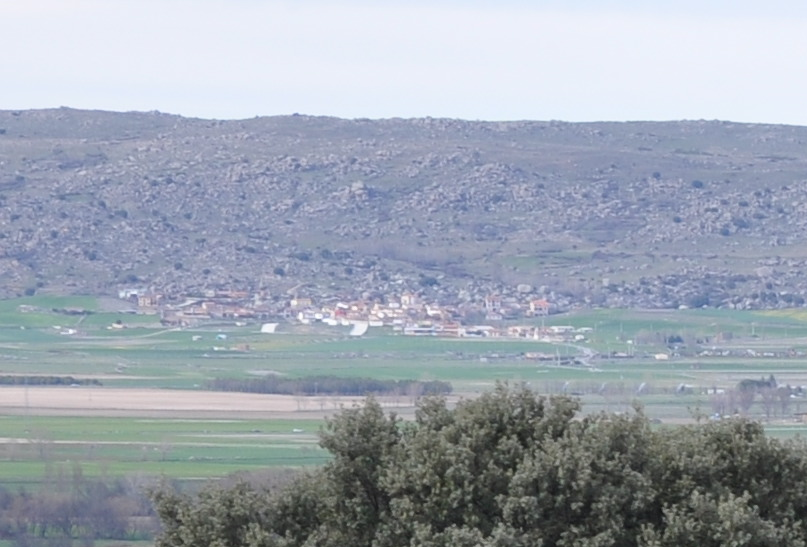
- Muñopepe
- Flag Coat of arms
- Location in Spain. Muñopepe (Spain)
- Coordinates: 40°38′08″N 4°49′05″W
- Country: Spain
- Autonomous community: Castile and León
- Province: Ávila
- Municipality: Muñopepe

Area
  - Total: 6 km^{2} (2.3 sq mi)

Population (2025-01-01)
  - Total: 95
  - Density: 16/km^{2} (41/sq mi)
- Time zone: UTC+1 (CET)
  - Summer (DST): UTC+2 (CEST)
- Website: Official website

Muñopepe is a municipality located in the province of Ávila, Castile and León, Spain.

== Population ==
Historical population
Year	Pop.	±% p.a.
2023	103	—
2024	104	+0.97%
2025	95	−8.65%
Source: INE
