= Ojos-Albos =

- municipality
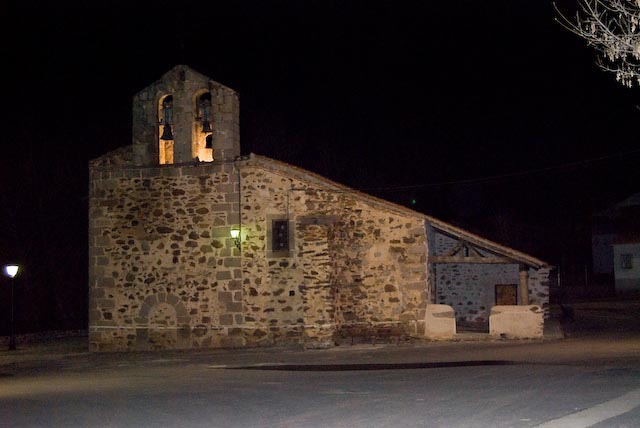

- Flag Coat of arms

- Location in Spain. Ojos-Albos (Spain)
- Coordinates: 40°42′24″N 4°30′59″W
- Country: Spain
- Autonomous community: Castile and León
- Province: Ávila
- Municipality: Ojos-Albos

Area
  - Total: 43 km^{2} (17 sq mi)

Population (2025-01-01)
  - Total: 89
  - Density: 2.1/km^{2} (5.4/sq mi)
- Time zone: UTC+1 (CET)
  - Summer (DST): UTC+2 (CEST)
- Website: Official website

Ojos-Albos is a municipality located in the province of Ávila, Castile and León, Spain.As of 2025 it had a population of 89

== Population ==
Historical population
Year	Pop.	±% p.a.
2023	91	—
2024	96	+5.49%
2025	89	−7.29%
Source: INE
