= List of Bienes de Interés Cultural in the Province of Guadalajara =

This is a list of Bien de Interés Cultural landmarks in the Province of Guadalajara, Spain.

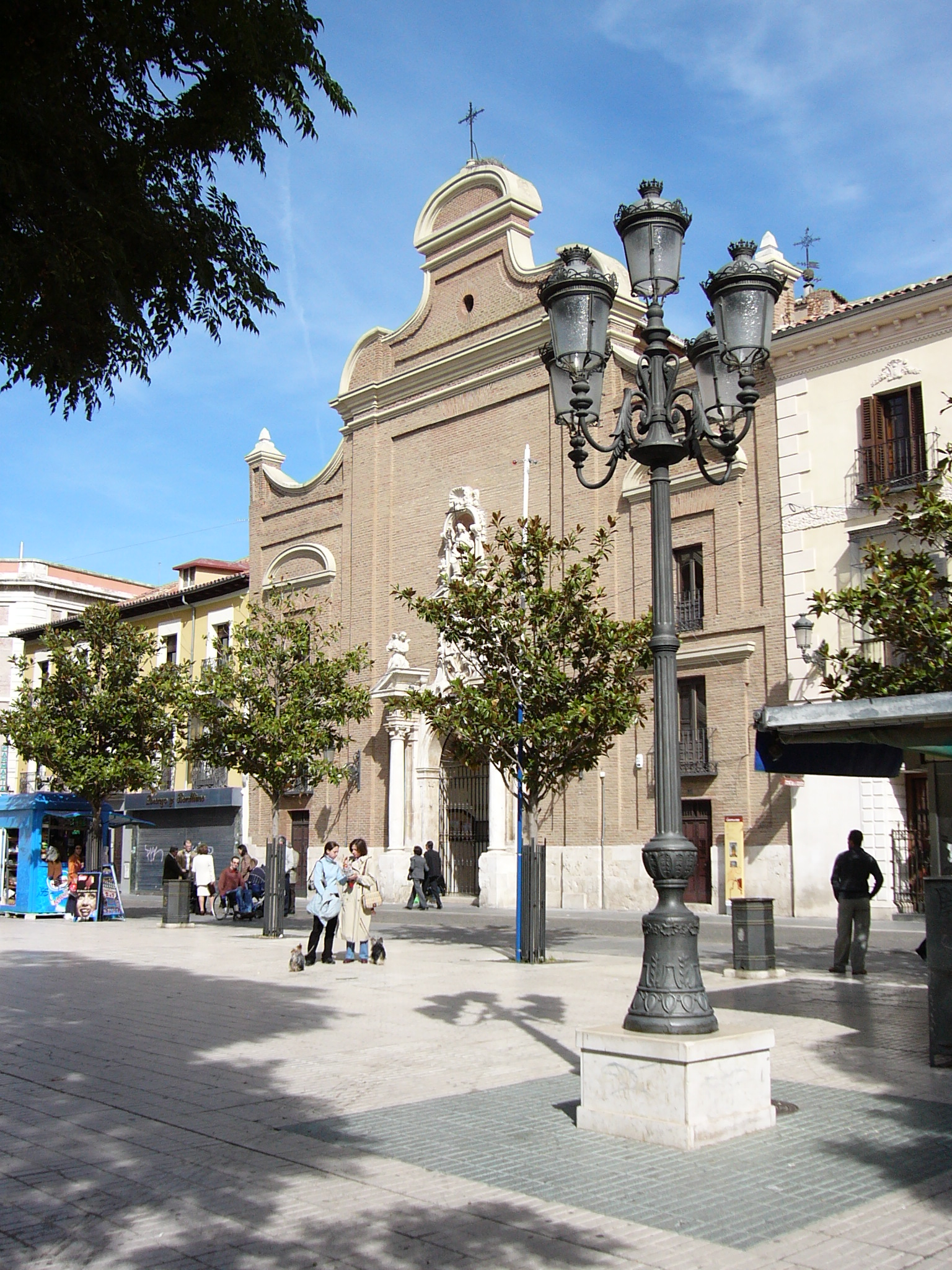
Church of San Nicolás.

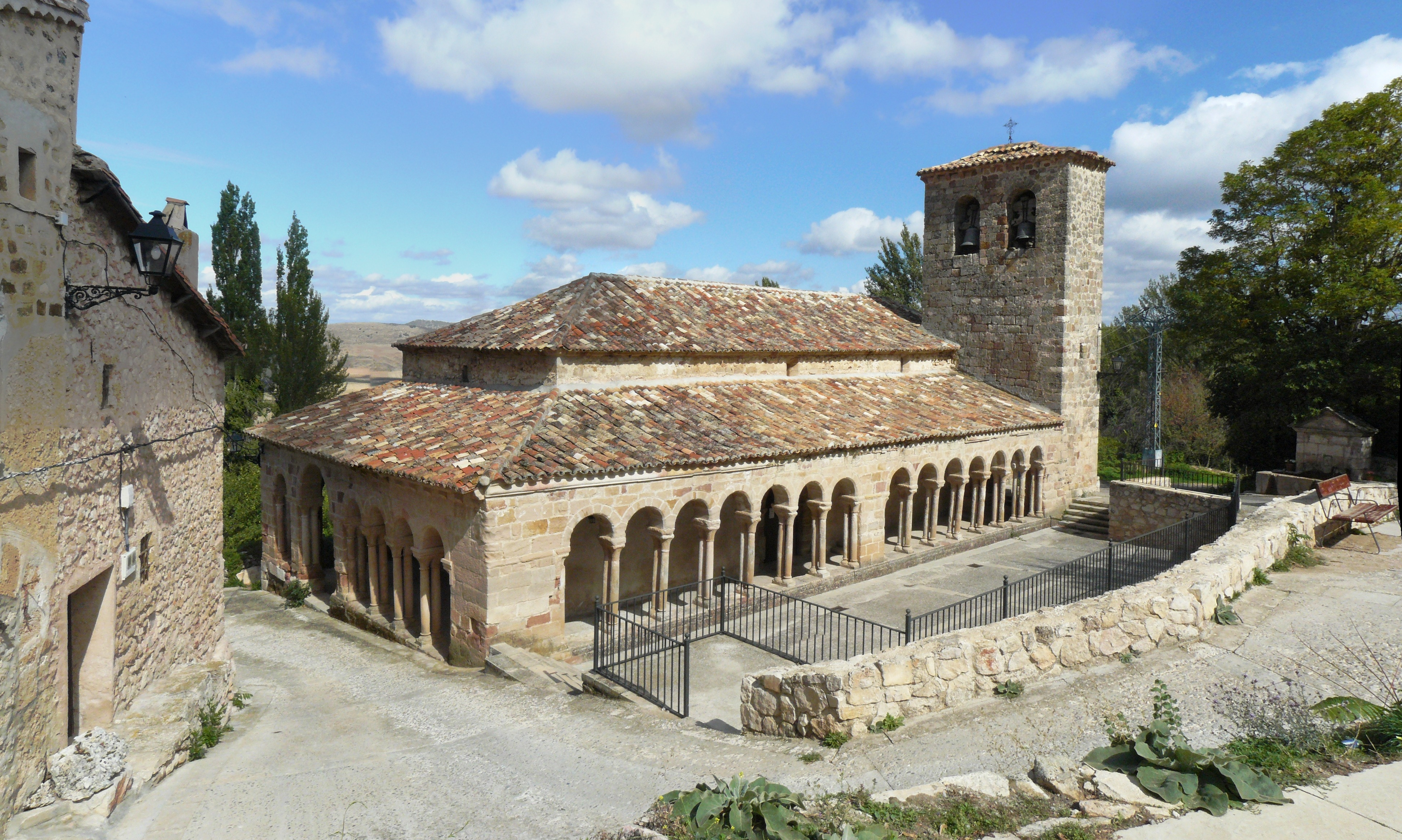
Church of El Salvador.

- Bridge of Henares
- Castle of Atienza
- Castle of Pelegrina
- Chapel of Luis de Lucena
- Church of El Salvador
- Church of la Piedad (Guadalajara)
- Church of los Remedios
- Church of San Bartolomé*Sigüenza Cathedral
- Church of San Ginés
- Church of San Juan Bautista
- Church of San Miguel
- Church of San Nicolás
- Church of Santiago el Mayor
- Church of Santo Domingo de Silos (Millana)
- Convent of las Carmelitas de San José
- Co-cathedral of Santa María de la Fuente la Mayor
- Cueva de los Casares
- Foundation of San Diego de Alcalá-Fundación de la Vega del Pozo
- Goyeneche Palace
- Hermitage of Santa Coloma de Albendiego
- Palace of Antonio de Mendoza
- Palace of Infantado
- Palace of the Dukes of Medinaceli (Cogolludo)
- Salt mine of Imón
- Santa Maria de Ovila
- Tower of Álvar Fáñez
