= Church of Santiago =

Church of Santiago may refer to:

- Church of Santiago (Jerez de la Frontera)
- Church of Santiago (Lorca)
- Church of Santiago (Sariego)
- Church of Santiago, Toledo
- Church of Santiago el Mayor (Guadalajara)
- Church of Santiago Apóstol (Villa del Prado)
- Church of Santiago de Gobiendes
