= Iglesia de San Nicolás =

Iglesia de San Nicolás may refer to:

- Iglesia de San Nicolás (Avilés), a church in Asturias, Spain
- Iglesia de San Nicolás (Guadalajara)
- Iglesia de San Nicolás (Madrid)
- Iglesia de San Nicolás (Villoria), a church in Asturias, Spain
