= Escamilla =

Escamilla, Spain
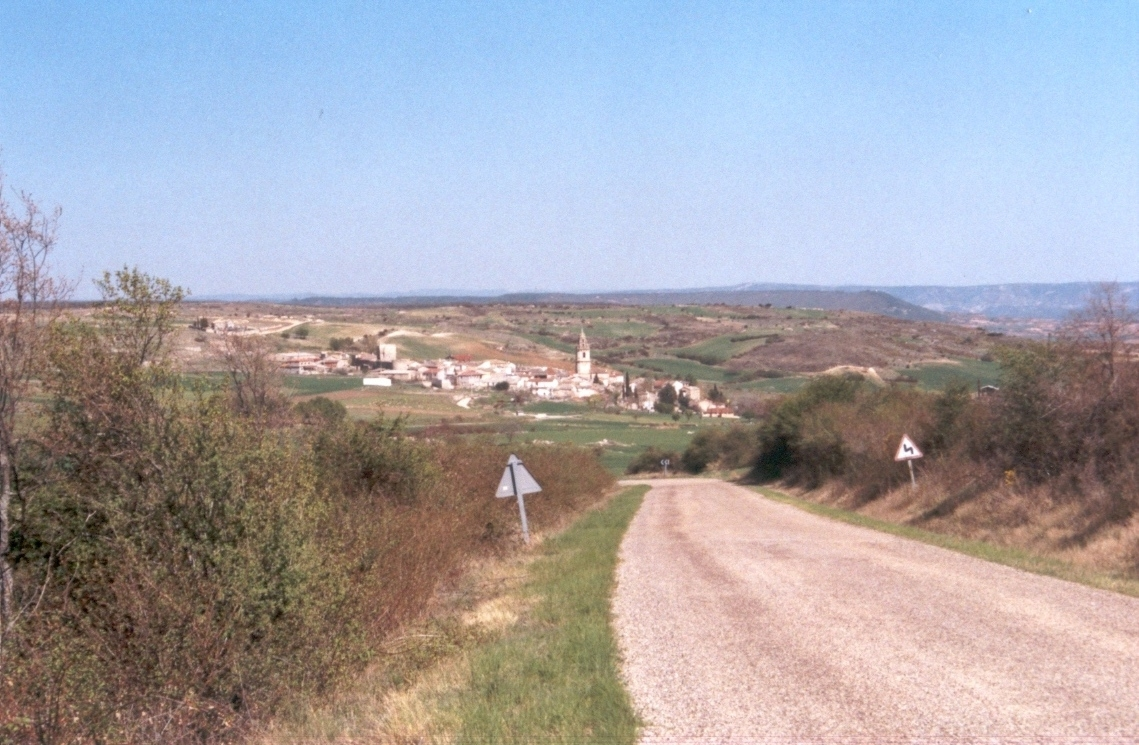

- Coat of arms

- Location within Province of Guadalajara Location within Castilla-La Mancha Location within Spain
- Coordinates: 40°33′3″N 2°33′41″W
- Country: Spain
- Autonomous community: Castile-La Mancha
- Province: Guadalajara
- Municipality: Escamilla

Government
  - Mayor: Marcelino Guerrero Higuera

Area
  - Total: 39 km^{2} (15 sq mi)
- Elevation: 1,023 m (3,356 ft)

Population (2025-01-01)
  - Total: 65
  - Density: 1.7/km^{2} (4.3/sq mi)
- Time zone: UTC+1 (CET)
  - Summer (DST): UTC+2 (CEST)

Escamilla is a municipality located in the province of Guadalajara, Castile-La Mancha, Spain. According to the 2004 census (INE), the municipality has a population of 108 inhabitants.

== Geography ==
Located at an altitude of 1,023 meters, the municipality is 39.21 km^{2} and borders Peralveche to the north, Salmerón and the Province of Cuenca to the east, Pareja to the west and Millana to the south. The creek drains the municipal Escamilla to Guadiela River Basin to the south. The highlight of the term is the Villar, with 1,102 meters, located just over 2 miles north of the town, while the lowest point lies to the south, about 800 meters.

== Demographics ==
Escamilla was an important town in the mid-twentieth century, when the cultivation of lavender gave some economic importance to Escamilla. Its abandonment for various reasons caused a period of decline, whose traces are still visible in the ruins of the lavender distillery, located some 100 meters south of the village. This decline accelerated the process of migration and the resulting depopulation. In 1960 Escamilla still had 591 inhabitants, but the population decreased to 353 according to the census of 1970 and to more than 100 people in 2000. In 2005, according to calculations by D. Guerrero Felix Villalba, a resident of the village, the number of permanent residents of the town was only about 40 people.

Recent Demographic Trends
| 1996 | 1998 | 1999 | 2000 | 2001 | 2002 | 2003 | 2004 | 2005 | 2006 |
|---|---|---|---|---|---|---|---|---|---|
| 146 (66-80) | 132 (57-75) | 129 (54-75) | 127 (54-73) | 118 (50-68) | 110 (43-67) | 107 (44-63) | 105 (43-62) | 108 (47-61) | 108 (49-59) |

- In the above table are in parentheses Escamilla inhabitants according to data from the municipal census of the National Statistics Institute. No data is available for 1997.
- Figures in parentheses indicate the number of inhabitants by sex (male and female)
- Data are from a population of high average age, in which a few exceptions, women experience superior life expectancy.

== Monuments ==
Palacio de los Antelos, 15th century. Castillo y murallas de Escamilla, the ninth century. The castle was rebuilt and adapted as Gothic palace in the fifteenth century. Iglesia de la Purificación, neoclassical eighteenth century baroque tower topped by a weathercock. The Iglesia de Nuestra Señora de la Purificación was declared a Bien de Iglesia de Interés Cultural in 1979.
