= Battle of Los Alporchones =

Battle of the Spanish Reconquista

- Part of the Spanish Reconquista
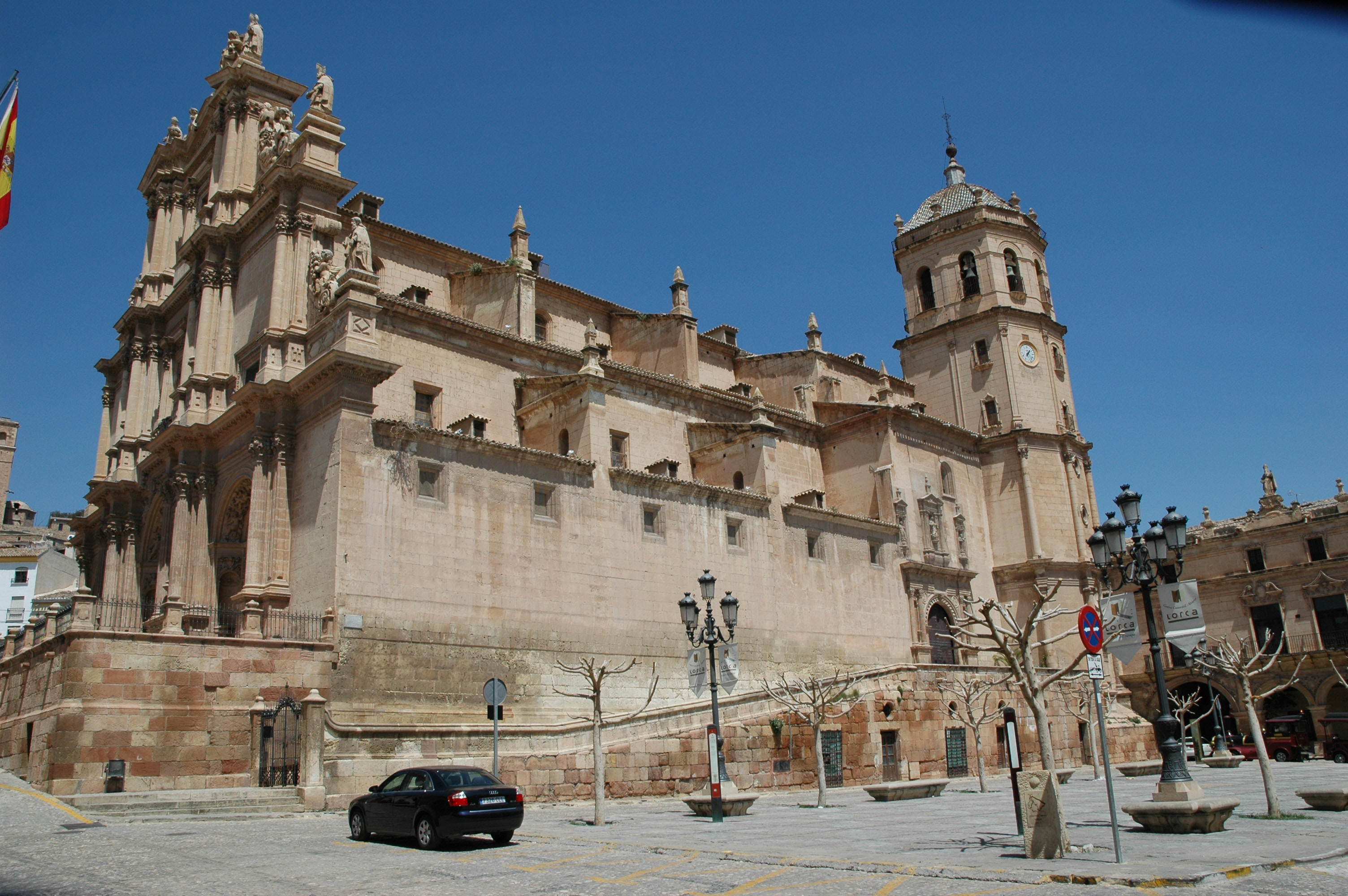
- The Church of St. Patrick in Lorca, named thus because of the date the battle was fought on
Date	17 March 1452
Location	near Lorca, Murcia, Spain
Result	Castilian victory

Belligerents
Crown of Castile; Kingdom of Murcia	Emirate of Granada

Commanders and leaders
John II of Castile; Alonso Fajardo el Bravo	Muhammad IX of Granada (surrendered); Malik Anes (POW) (executed)

Strength
400–700 knights 1,700–2,000 foot soldiers	Unknown

Casualties and losses
40 killed 200 injured	High; 400 captured

The Battle of Los Alporchones was a battle of the Spanish Reconquista that took place on 17 March 1452. The battle was fought between the troops of the Emirate of Granada and the combined forces of the Kingdom of Castile and its client kingdom, the Kingdom of Murcia. The Moorish army was commanded by Malik ibn al-Abbas and the Castilian troops were commanded by Alonso Fajardo el Bravo, the head of the House of Fajardo and the Alcalde of Lorca Castle. The battle was fought in the area around the city of Lorca and resulted in a victory for the Kingdom of Castile.

== Context ==
After regaining the throne from Ismail III in 1447, Muhammed IX continued his bellicose policies with regards to the Kingdom of Castile. His predecessor had managed to retake a few frontier towns from the Kingdom of Murcia through regular raids or Razzis which terrorized the region's Christian population. Most of these incursions into Christian territory took advantage of squabbles within the Kingdom of Murcia's ruling family, the House of Fajardo. In 1448, Muslim forces captured and sacked the town of Cieza, and soon defeated Christian forces at the Battle of Hellín.

The continued Muslim incursions into Murcia obliged the Castilian monarch, John II of Castile to ask for a truce in 1450 in order to concentrate his own forces in a separate war against Juan Pacheco, the Marquis of Villena. However, Muhammad IX refused the truce, preferring to take full advantage of the disunity amongst Castilian nobles. The Granadan Sultan's fresh incursion into Murcia brought back much plunder in 1451. Muhammad IX then planned a large scale Algara (Arabic for incursion: الغارة) against the area of Campo de Cartagena. This raid captured 40,000 heads of cattle and around 40 prisoners, mostly herdsmen.

The immensity of this raid incursion forced Castile's Christians to put aside their internal squabbles and form a united front against the Kingdom of Granada. The Alcalde of Lorca Castle, Alonso Fajardo, nicknamed el Bravo (English: The Brave) sent heralds to various towns within the Kingdom of Murcia. The resulting army from Aledo, Caravaca de la Cruz, and Murcia totaled around 300 knights and 2,000 infantry soldiers. They encamped outside Lorca, in a field called Los Alporchones, knowing that the Muslim raiders would have to pass through the area when returning from their pillaging expedition.

== Battle ==
On 17 March 1452, the Moorish army finally arrived at Los Alporchones and an action was fought between the two parties. The Castilian attack came initially as a surprise and the Christian forces were able to get an early advantage over the Granadan army. The Castilian army was nearly immediately victorious; however the Granadan commander, Malik ibn al-Abbas who was renowned for his courage and competence, succeeded in reforming his line twice during the engagement. The chronicles recount that the Alcalde, Alonso Fajardo, arriving at the conclusion that the fight could go either way, decided to enter into single combat with the enemy captain. The pair fought until Fajardo managed to unhorse al-Abbas, taking him prisoner.

The capture of the Granadan captain broke the morale of the Muslim army who were routed from the field. They were pursued by the Castilian forces all the way to Vera in the Province of Almería where it is mentioned that only 300 managed to escape. The Granadan casualties were very high with around 400 captured, whilst the Castilian casualties were around 40 dead and 200 wounded.

== Consequences ==
The battle had many lasting consequences. Incursions into the territory of the Kingdom of Murcia stopped altogether as the Kingdom of Granada asked for a five-year truce. Future conflicts would remain on Granadan territory until the Granada War. The prestige of Lorca and in particular the House of Fajardo rose significantly. It was one of the branches of this noble house that would eventually go on to form the powerful House of los Vélez.

In homage to St Patrick of Ireland, whose saint's day is celebrated on 17 March, the same day as the battle, he was named the patron saint of the city of Murcia. A church was built in Lorca which would later house the Colegiata de San Patricio.

Malik ibn al-Abbas was executed by his captors shortly after the battle whilst the victor, Alonso Fajardo el Bravo would go on to be slain in a battle in Caravaca de la Cruz against soldiers under the command of his cousin, Pedro Fajardo, the Adelantado in the service of Henry IV of Castile.

== Legacy ==
The battle, as many battles of the Reconquista, was the subject of poetical works. The following Spanish language text is an excerpt from the beginning of a short poem describing the events of the battle. Of note, the Arabic names have all been used with their Spanish equivalents, the names that they would have been known by to their Spanish enemies. For example, Malik ibn al-Abbas was known as Alabez de Vera.

Allá en Granada la rica (Over there, in Granada, the rich one)
instrumentos oí tocar (I heard instruments being played)
en la calle Gomeles (at the street of Gomeles)
a la puerta de Abidvar (at Abdivar Gate)
el cual es moro valiente (who is a valiant Moorish)
y muy fuerte capitán (and a very strong Captain)
Manda juntar muchos moros (he orders to bring together many Moors)
bien diestros en pelear (well versed in fighting)
porque en el Campo de Lorca (because at the Lorca field)
se determinan de entrar (they are decided to invade)
con él salen tres alcaides (with him depart three Mayors)
aquí los quiero nombrar: (here I want to give their names:)
Almoradí de Guadix (Almoradi of Guadix)
éste es de sangre real (he is from royal blood)
Abenaciz es el otro (Abenaciz is the other one)
y de Baza natural (born in Baza)
y de Vera es Alabez (and from Vera is Alabez)
de esfuerzo muy singular (who is a singularly hard fighter)
y en cualquier guerra su gente (and in any war his people)
bien la sabe acaudillar (he knows well how to lead)
|Ginés Pérez de Hita

== See also ==
- Emirate of Granada
- Kingdom of Castile
- House of Fajardo
