= Siege of Guardamar =

- Part of Battle of the Strait
Date	1331
Location	Guardamar del Segura
Result	Granada victory

Belligerents
Crown of Aragon	Emirate of Granada

Commanders and leaders
Pere de Tona	Abu-l-Nuaym Ridwan

Strength
27 arbalist	5,000 horsemen

Casualties and losses
22 dead 1,500 captives	Unknown

The siege of Guardamar in 1331 was one of the battles of the Battle of the Strait.

== Background ==
In 1306 the council of Guardamar del Segura, which consisted of a thousand inhabitants in 1308 sent a letter to James II of Aragon affirming, through captives, that whenever a raid was planned on territories of the Procuració General d'Enllà Xixona they thought of attacking Guardamar because it was the weakest point due to the conditions of the castle and the wall.

In 1329 the Granadans managed to recover Algeciras, and at the beginning of 1330 Pope John XXII three years of tithes to the kings of Aragon, Castile and Portugal with the obligation to make at least one expedition to the Emirate of Granada in which they had to go personally.

In 1330, coinciding with the Castilian attack, with 500 horsemen from the Kingdom of Portugal on the western border, which ended with the Battle of Thebes, there was a Catalan raid on the Murcia-Andalusian border in the context of the crusade against the emirate of Granada started in 1330: with the presence of Alfons XI of Castile on the western front, the Castilian troops and Valencians tried to cause all the damage they could to the populations of the eastern part, leaving Llorca.

With the truce signed on February 19, 1331 the campaign of Alfonso XI of Castile ended, the Grenadians were able to concentrate their forces, consisting of two thousand five hundred men on horseback and twelve thousand on foot, commanded by Abu-l-Nuaym Ridwan ibn Abd Allah on the border with the Crown of Aragon.

The Grenadians, with reinforcements from Morocco, from their base in Algeciras, took Gibraltar and Xerès.

== The Siege ==
The residents of Guardamar del Segura, fearing the attack, asked for help from the prosecutor Guillem de Liminyana, who was in Oriola, but only Pere de Tona, with twenty -and-seven crossbowmen and lancers went to the defense of the town.

The Grenadians, led by Abu-l-Nuaym Ridwan, with an army of five thousand men on horseback, fifteen thousand footmen, among them five thousand crossbowmen, and some machines of war that threw fireballs, entered the Kingdom of Valencia by Oriola and on October 18 of 1331 the siege was established and the next day Guardamar was shot down and taken completely, twenty-two of the defending soldiers dying, and the rest, being captured with the rest of the population.

== Aftermath ==
The army of Abu-l-Nuaym Ridwan took 1,500 captives, and another 1,500 Moors from the Elda valley, forcibly or voluntarily, by leave with them to the Emirate of Granada. Some were allowed to return in the following years. Fearing that the Grenadines would attack Oriola or Alicante again, the king ordered the spokesman of the royal procurator Jofré Gilabert de Cruïlles to gather all the knights and infantry of the territory in Alicante at the end of October.

In 1332, Ridwan again attacked the border and in April laid siege of Elche, which he raised after cutting down the vegetable garden upon learning that Alfonso the Benign was approaching with his army. After the retreat, the Grenadians, with Marinid Dynasty reinforcements besieged and take Gibraltar.

Jofré Gilabert de Cruïlles, the commander of the order of Montesa Xivert Dalmau de Cruïlles, the noble and advanced don Joan Manuel and the bishop of Murcia agreed, all together, to an entry in Moorish land, which would leave Lorca again at the end of August 1333.

== Sources ==
- Jerónimo Zurita Annals of the Crown of Aragon.
- Ferrer & María Teresa The border with Islam in the 14th century Christians and Saracens in the Valencian Community.
- Rovira i Virgili National History of Catalonia Editions Patria 1920
