= Church of San Nicolás =

Church of San Nicolás may refer to:

- Church of San Nicolás, Guadalajara
- Church of San Nicolás, Madrid
- Church of San Nicolás, Portomarín
- Church of San Nicolás, Soria
- Church of San Nicolás, Valencia
