= Church of Santo Domingo =

Church of Santo Domingo may refer to:

- Church of Santo Domingo de Guzmán (Málaga)
- Church of Santo Domingo de Silos (Millana)
- Church of Santo Domingo (Puebla)
- Church of Santo Domingo de Guzmán (Oaxaca)
- Church of Santo Domingo (Soria)
