= Lorca =

Lorca may refer to:

== Lorquino football clubs ==
- CF Lorca Deportiva, founded 2012
- CF Lorca Deportiva (1969), dissolved 1994
- Lorca Atlético CF, 2010–2012
- Lorca Deportiva CF, 2002–2012
- Lorca Deportiva CF B, 2005–2009
- Lorca FC, 2003–2018
- Lorca FC B, 2012–2018

== Media ==
- Gabriel Lorca, fictional characters from the TV series Star Trek: Discovery
- Homenaje a Federico García Lorca, a work for chamber orchestra by the Mexican composer Silvestre Revueltas
- Lorca (album), the fifth album by singer-songwriter Tim Buckley

== People ==
=== Given name ===
- Lorca Van De Putte (born 1988), Belgian football defender
- Philip-Lorca diCorcia (born 1951), American photographer

=== Surname ===
- Carlos Lorca (born 1944), Chilean physician and politician
- Federico García Lorca (1898–1936), Spanish poet, playwright, and theatre director
- Juan Gonzalo Lorca (born 1985), Chilean footballer

== Places ==
- Castle of Lorca, a Lorquino fortress of medieval origin constructed between the 9th and 15th centuries
- Federico García Lorca Granada Airport, the airport serving the province and city of Granada, Spain
- Lorca, Spain, a municipality and city in the autonomous community of Murcia
- Taifa of Lorca, a medieval Islamic Moorish taifa kingdom centered in modern southern Spain

== See also ==
- Llorca, a surname
- Lorcha (disambiguation)
