= Siege of Elche =

- Part of Battle of the Strait
Date	1332
Location	Elche
Result	Granada victory

Belligerents
Crown of Aragon	Emirate of Granada

Commanders and leaders
Pere de Tona	Abu-l-Nuaym Ridwan

Strength
Unknown	3,000 horsemen 10,000 foot soldiers

Casualties and losses
Unknown	Unknown

The siege of Elche of 1332 was one of the battles of the Battle of the Strait.

== Background ==
In 1306 the council of Guardamar, which consisted of a thousand inhabitants in 1308 sent a letter to James II of Aragon, affirming, through captives, that whenever a raid was planned on territories of the Procuració General d'Enllà Xixona they thought of attacking Guardamar because it was the weakest point due to the conditions of the castle and the wall.

In 1329 the Granadans managed to recover Algeciras, and at the beginning of 1330 Pope John XXII three years of tithes to the kings of Aragon, Castile and Portugal with the obligation to make at least one expedition to the Emirate of Granada in which they had to go personally.

In 1330, coinciding with the Castilian attack, with 500 horsemen from the Kingdom of Portugal on the western border, which ended with the Battle of Thebes, there was a Catalan raid on the Murcia-Andalusian border in the context of the crusade against the emirate of Granada started in 1330: with the presence of Alfonso XI of Castile on the western front, the Castilian troops and Valencians tried to cause all the damage they could to the populations of the eastern part, leaving Llorca.

With the truce signed on February 19, 1331 the campaign of Alfonso XI of Castile ended, the Grenadians were able to concentrate their forces, consisting of two thousand five hundred men on horseback and twelve thousand on foot, commanded by Abu-l-Nuaym Ridwan ibn Abd Allah on the border with the Crown of Aragon.

The Grenadians, with reinforcements from Morocco, from their base in Algeciras, took Gibraltar and Xerès, and the army of Abu-l-Nuaym Ridwan, in October 1331 he took Guardamar and 1,500 captives, and another 1,500 Moors from the Elda valley, forced or voluntarily, to march with them in the Emirate of Granada. Some were allowed to return in the following years.

== Siege ==
In 1332, Ridwan again attacked the frontier and with 10,000 horsemen and 30,000 foot soldiers on April 9 laid siege to Elx, which rose on April 14 after cutting down the orchard when he learned that Alfons the Benign was approaching with his army.

== Aftermath ==
After the withdrawal, the Grenadians, with Marinid Dynasty reinforcements besieged and took Gibraltar.

The spokesman of the royal procurator in the Oriolan area Jofré Gilabert de Cruïlles, the commander of Xivert Dalmau de Cruïlles -of the order of Montesa-, the noble and advanced Don Joan Manuel and the bishop de Murcia, who agreed, all together, to make an entry into Moorish land, which would leave Lorca again at the end of August 1333.

== Sources ==
- Jerónimo Zurita Annals of the Crown of Aragon.
- Ferrer & María Teresa The border with Islam in the 14th century Christians and Saracens in the Valencian Community.
- Rovira i Virgili National History of Catalonia Editions Patria 1920
