= Convent of Virgen de Las Huertas (Lorca) =

Convent in Lorca, Spain

The Convent of Virgen de Las Huertas is a convent located in Lorca, Spain. It was damaged in the 2011 Lorca earthquake.
