= Albendiego =

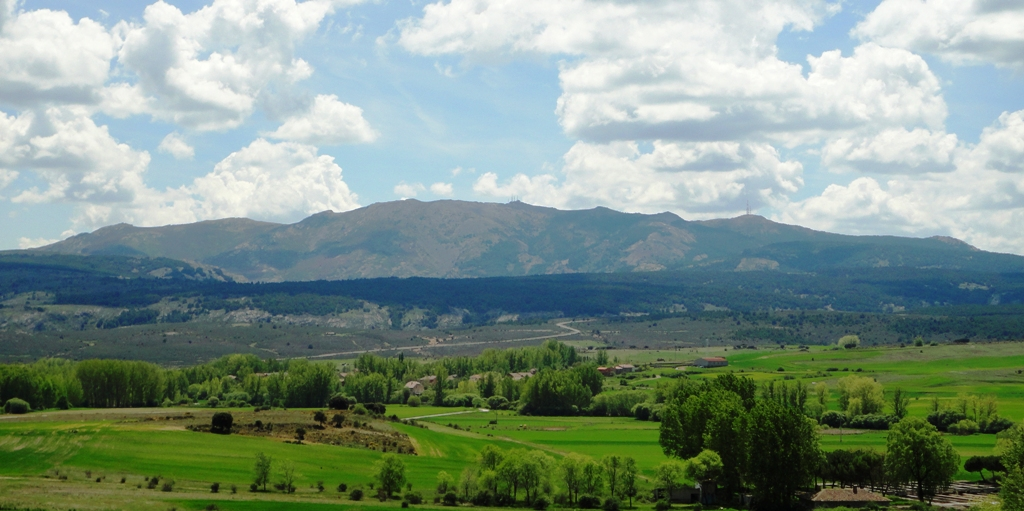

- Location within Province of Guadalajara Location within Castilla-La Mancha Location within Spain
- Country: Spain
- Autonomous community: Castile-La Mancha
- Province: Guadalajara
- Municipality: Albendiego

Area
  - Total: 22.91 km^{2} (8.85 sq mi)

Population (2023)
  - Total: 23
  - Density: 1.7/km^{2} (4.4/sq mi)
- Time zone: UTC+1 (CET)
  - Summer (DST): UTC+2 (CEST)

Albendiego is a municipality located in the province of Guadalajara, Castile-La Mancha, Spain. According to the 2023 census (INE), the municipality has a population of 45 inhabitants. It contains the Hermitage of Santa Coloma de Albendiego.
