= Villa del Prado =

- Municipality
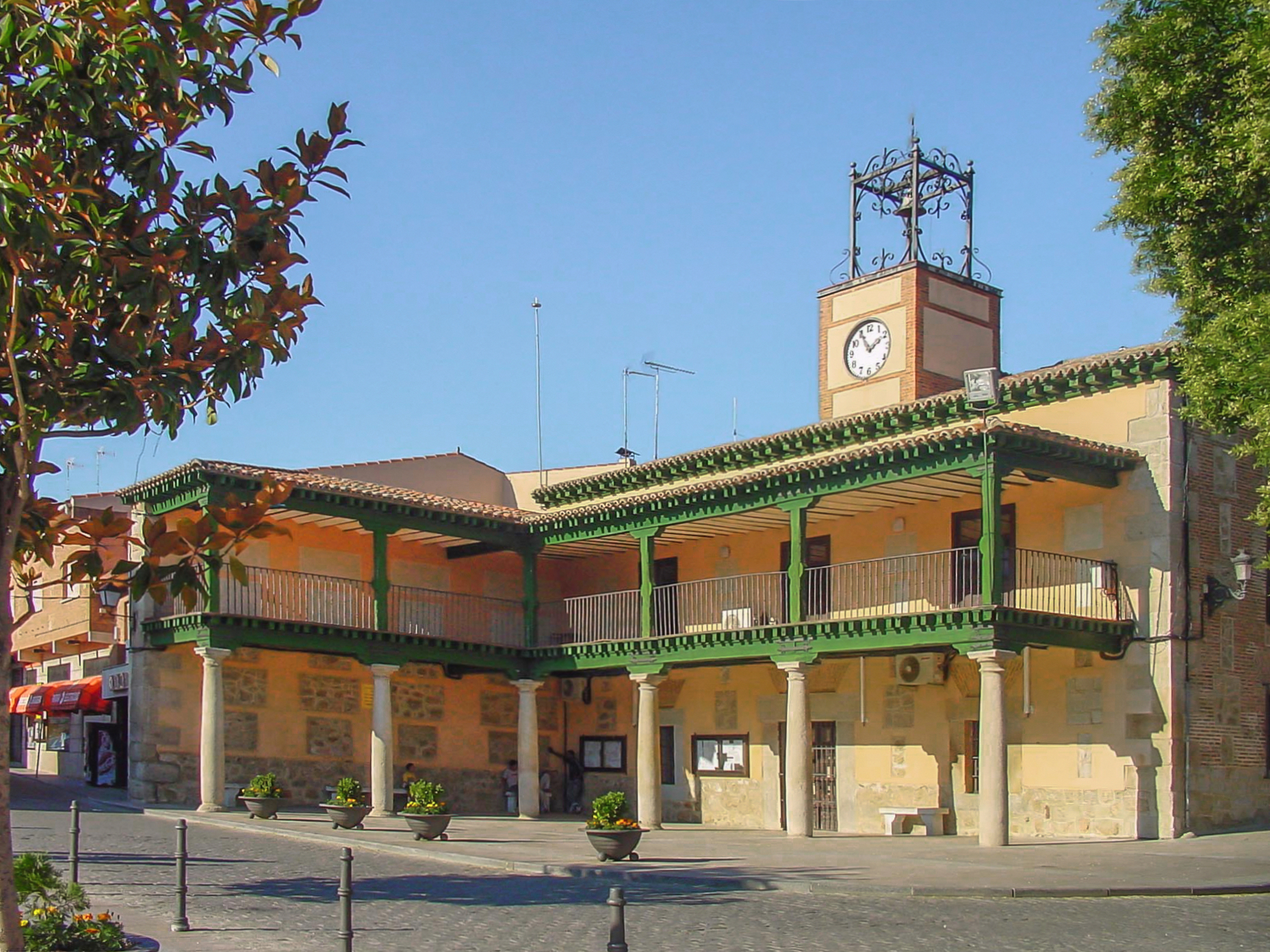
- Town hall

- Coat of arms

- Location in Spain.
- Coordinates: 40.276530°N 4.305773°W
- Country: Spain
- Autonomous community: Community of Madrid
- Province: Madrid
- Comarca: Sierra Oeste de Madrid

Government
  - Mayor: Belén Rodríguez Palomino

Area
  - Total: 78.42 km^{2} (30.28 sq mi)
- Elevation: 510 m (1,670 ft)

Population (2025-01-01)
  - Total: 7,743
  - Density: 98.74/km^{2} (255.7/sq mi)
- Time zone: UTC+1 (CET)
  - Summer (DST): UTC+2 (CEST)
- Postal code: 28630

Villa del Prado is a municipality of the Community of Madrid, Spain. In 2022 it had a population of 7092.

Sights include the church of Santiago Apóstol.
