= Iglesia de Nuestra Señora de la Purificación, Escamilla =

Church of la Purificación
- Iglesia de la Purificación (Spanish)
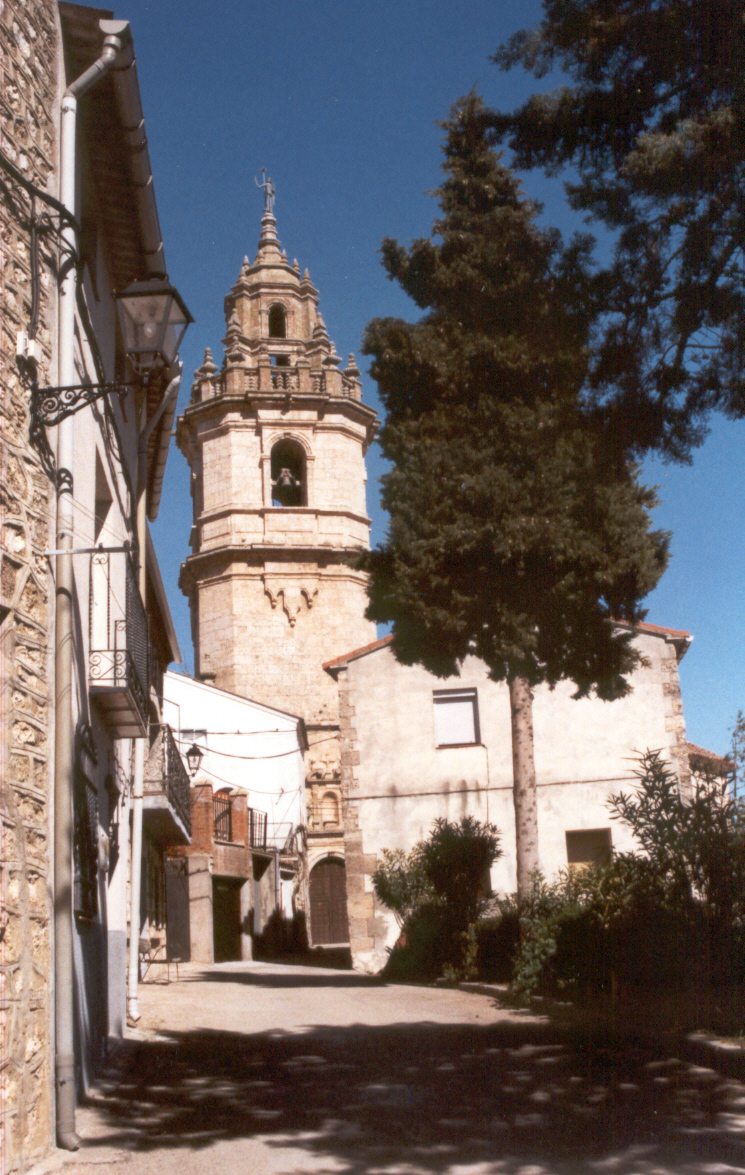

- Location within Spain
- 40.549272°N 2.562315°W
- Location: Escamilla, Spain

Spanish Cultural Heritage
- Official name: Iglesia de la Purificación
- Type: Non-movable
- Criteria: Monument
- Designated: 1979
- Reference no.: RI-51-0004332

The Church of la Purificación (Spanish: Iglesia de la Purificación) is a church located in Escamilla, Spain. It was declared Bien de Interés Cultural in 1979.

The church is best known for its Baroque bell-tower or Giralda. The church itself was built in a Renaissance style. The retablo dates from the 16th century.
