= Lorcha =

Lorcha may refer to:

- Lorcha/L'Orxa, a municipality in the Valencian Community, Spain
- Lorcha (boat), a type of sailing vessel having a Chinese junk rig on a Portuguese or European style hull

== See also ==
- Lorca (disambiguation)
