= Hermitage of San Clemente (Lorca) =

The Hermitage of San Clemente is a hermitage located in Lorca, Spain. It was damaged in the 2011 Lorca earthquake.

== About ==
On the interior, its stucco plant motifs in the domes, with paintings in vaults of angels, plant motifs and curtains, are its most outstanding features.

Built with rubblework and ashlar stone, it has three naves, the middle one being the most outstanding due to its size.

The Hermitage is one of the most important Baroque temples of the Spanish Murcia region and its volume is one of its main values. After construction it was consecrated in 1758 and its ground plan is shaped like a Greek cross.
