= Campisábalos =

Campisábalos, Spain
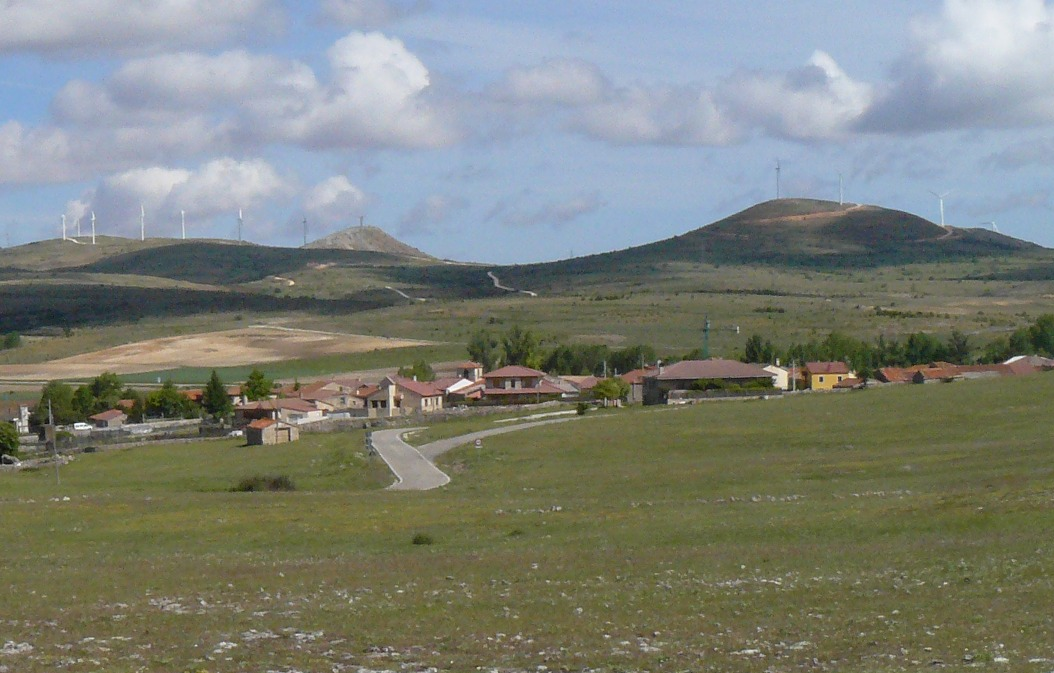

- Flag Coat of arms

- Location within Province of Guadalajara Location within Castilla-La Mancha Location within Spain
- Coordinates: 41°16′02″N 3°08′44″W
- Country: Spain
- Autonomous community: Castile-La Mancha
- Province: Guadalajara
- Municipality: Campisábalos

Area
  - Total: 54.01 km^{2} (20.85 sq mi)
- Elevation: 1,351 m (4,432 ft)

Population (2025-01-01)
  - Total: 72
  - Density: 1.3/km^{2} (3.5/sq mi)
- Time zone: UTC+1 (CET)
  - Summer (DST): UTC+2 (CEST)

Campisábalos is a municipality located in the province of Guadalajara, Castile-La Mancha, Spain. According to the 2004 census (INE), the municipality had a population of 71 inhabitants.

== Main sights ==
- Church of San Bartolomé
