= Battle of Hellín =

Battle of Hellín (1448)
- Part of the Spanish Reconquista
Date	December 1448
Location	Hellín, Crown of Castile 38°31′0″N 1°41′00″W
Result	Granadan victory

Belligerents
Crown of Castile; Kingdom of Murcia	Emirate of Granada

Commanders and leaders
Alfonso Téllez-Girón	Muhammad IX of Granada

Strength
Unknown	Unknown

Casualties and losses
Few survived	Unknown

The battle of Hellín or Disaster of Hellín was a military engagement between the Granadans and the Castilians near the city of Hellín. After initial defeat, the Granadas routed the Castilians and achieved a resounding victory.

== History ==
On December 1448, after previous losses, the Granadan Sultan, Muhammad IX, renewed his attack on Castile, especially the Kingdom of Murcia. He began ravaging the country and making spoils. The governor of Hellín, Alfonso Tellez de Giron, desiring to display his great leadership, went hastily to meet the Granadans in the field. The Castilians found some Granadans disbanded and separated from the main body, charged at them, and massacred them. The Castilians began collecting spoils from this victory and began to lose discipline.

The Granadans who managed to escape the massacre went to the main army and told the others of what had happened. The Granadans went back to the place where the battle had taken place. Finding the Castilians were dispersed and scattered, the Granadans charged at them furiously and managed to slaughter the majority of the Castilians. Few of the Castilians survived the massacre, including Alfonso, and retreated to Hellín. The victory at Hellín opened the way for the Granadans to ravage and loot Castilian territory at will.

== Sources ==
- Edward Grimstone (1612), The Generall Historie of Spaine. ... Translated Into English and Continued Unto These Times by H. Grimeston.
- Ana Echevarria (2009), Knights on the Frontier, The Moorish Guard of the Kings of Castile (1410-1467).
- Abel Soler Molina (2018), L’Europa cavalleresca i la ficció literària, La cort napolitana d’Alfons el Magnànim: el context de Curial e Güelfa. Vol III.
