= Iglesia de San Nicolás (Villoria) =

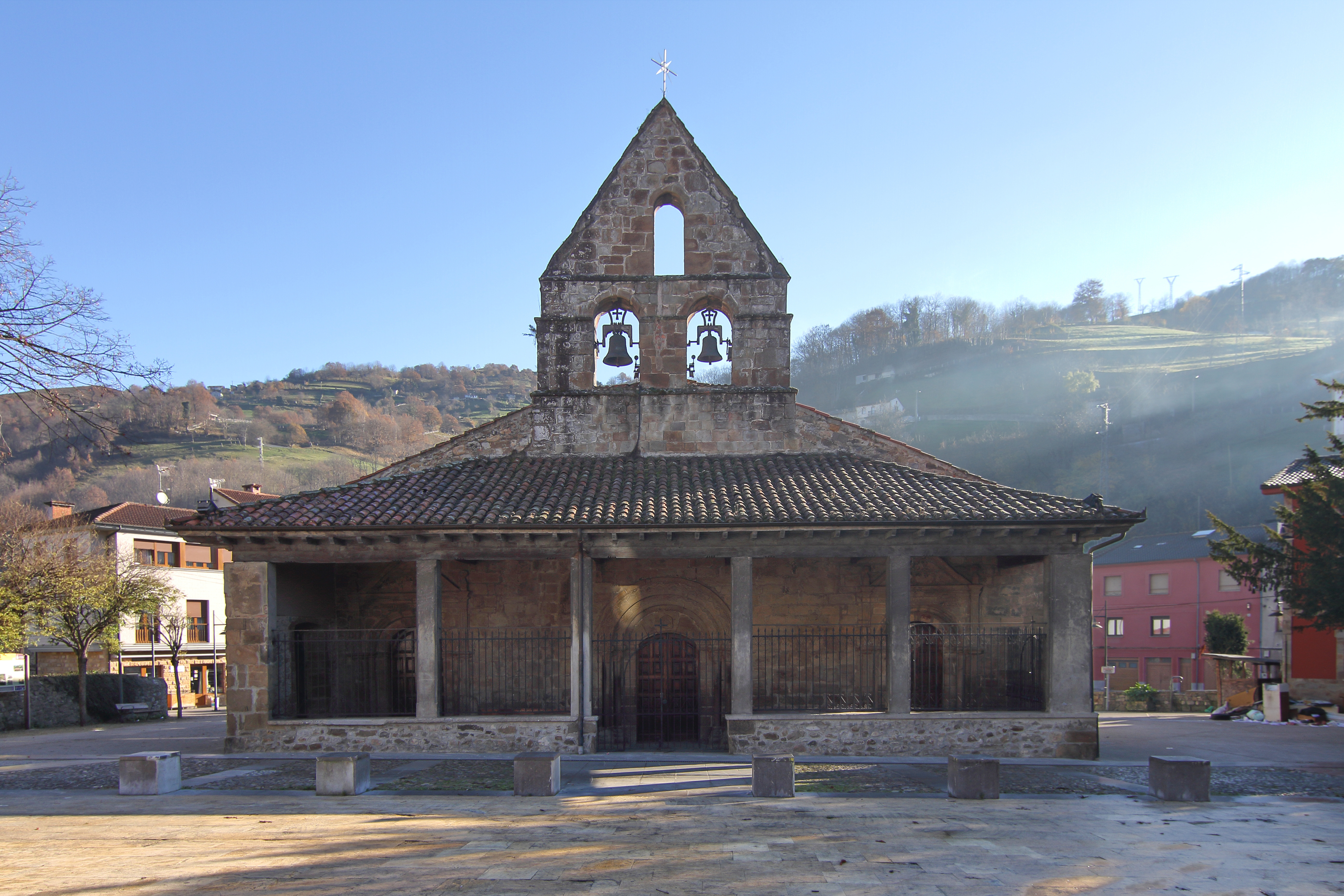
- Iglesia de San Nicolás (Villoria)
- 43.216733°N 5.56498°W
- Location: Asturias, Spain

San Nicolás is a Romanesque-style church in the diocese of Villoria in the concejo de Laviana, community of Asturias, Spain.

== See also ==
- Asturian art
- Catholic Church in Spain
