= Salt mine of Imón =

Salt mine de Imón
- Salinas de Imón (Spanish)
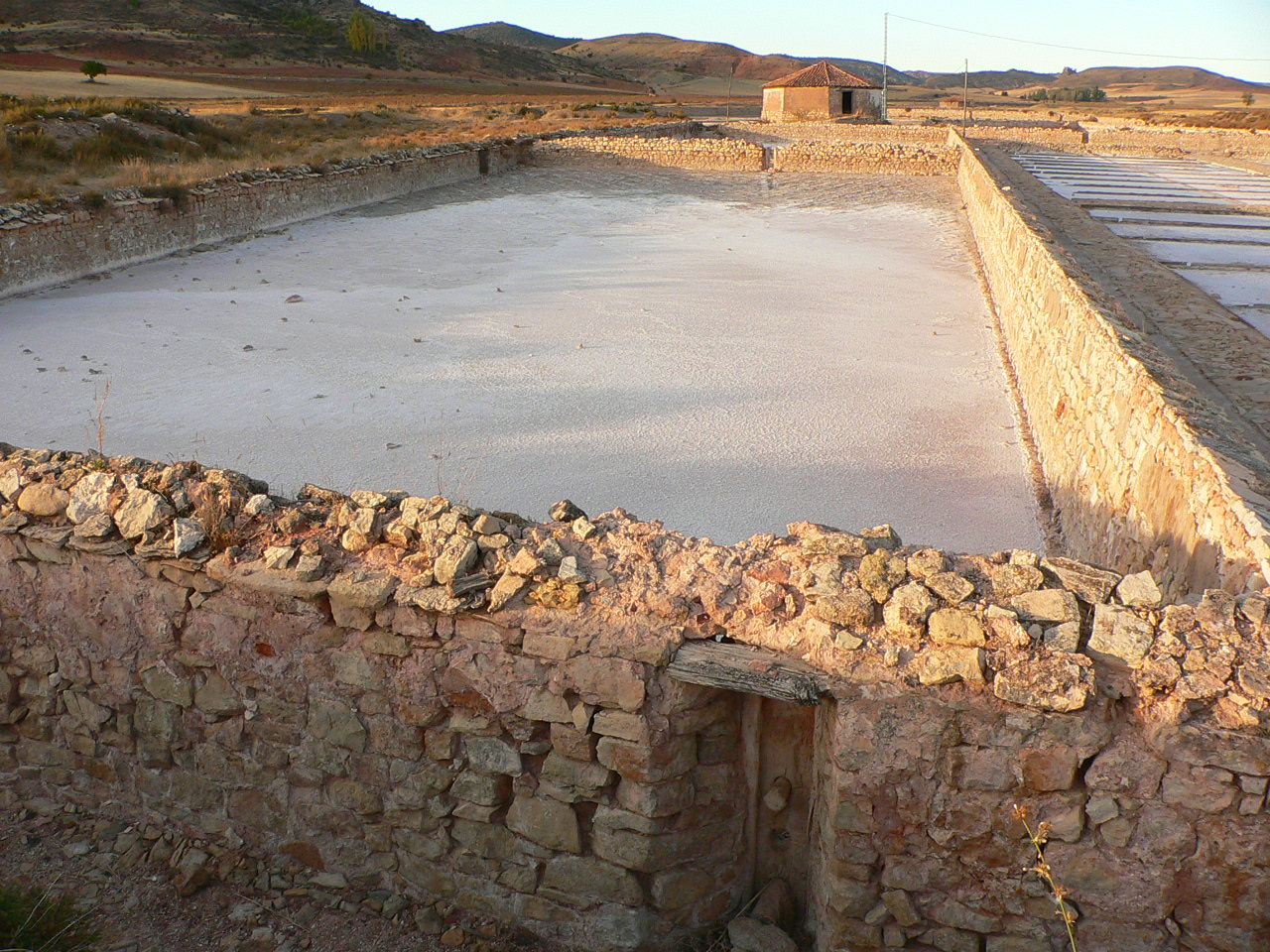

- Location within Spain
- 41.160556°N 2.726944°W
- Location: Sigüenza, Spain

Spanish Cultural Heritage
- Official name: Salinas de Imón
- Type: Non-movable
- Criteria: Monument
- Designated: 1992
- Reference no.: RI-51-0007282

The Salt mine of Imón (Spanish: Salinas de Imón) is a salt mine located in Sigüenza, Spain. It was declared Bien de Interés Cultural in 1992.
