= Castle of Pelegrina =

- Castillo de Pelegrina (Spanish)
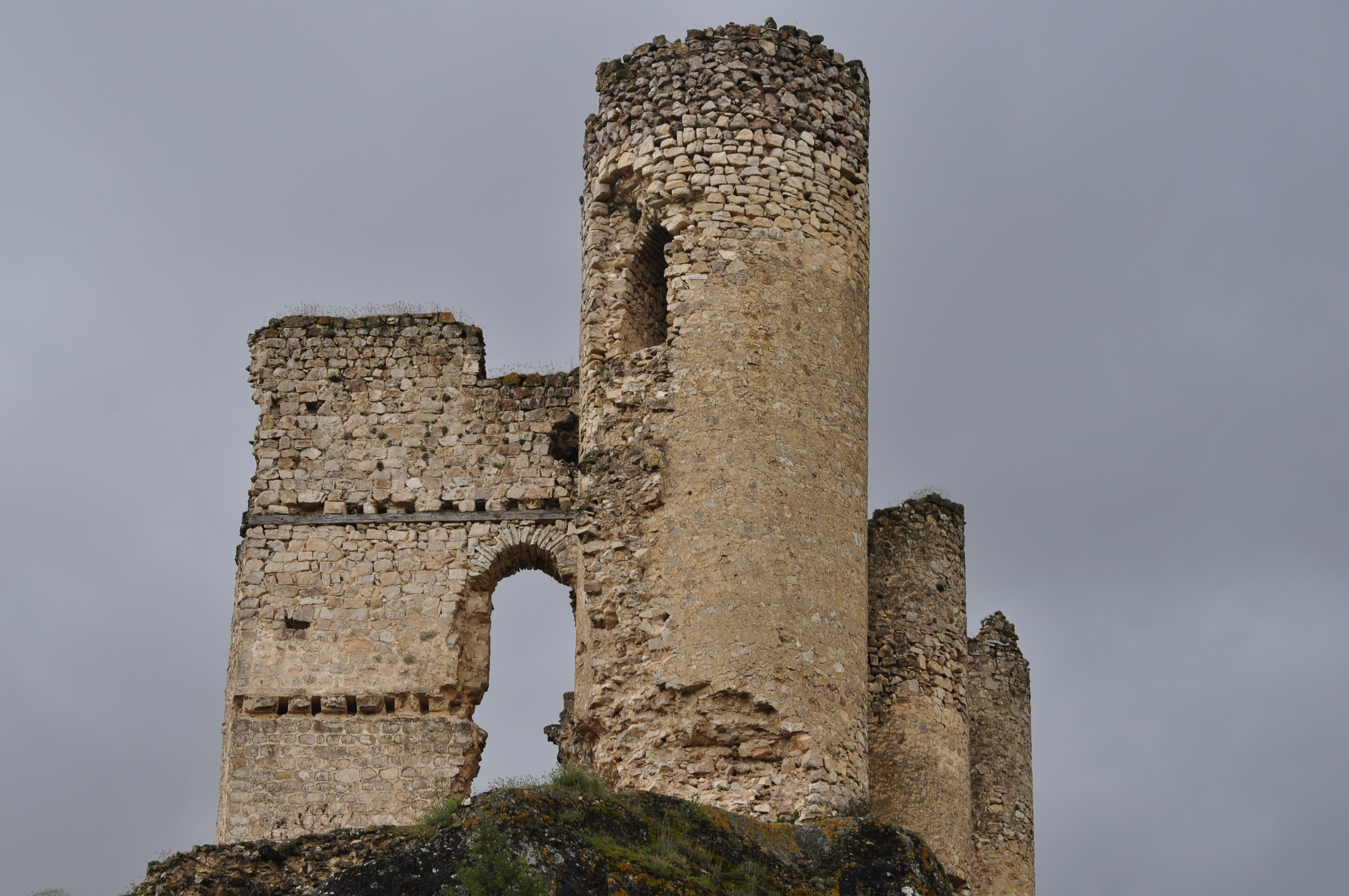

- Location within Spain
- 41.015°N 2.638333°W
- Location: Sigüenza, Spain

Spanish Cultural Heritage
- Official name: Castillo de Pelegrina
- Type: Non-movable
- Criteria: Monument
- Designated: 1949
- Reference no.: RI-51-0010726

The Castle of Pelegrina (Spanish: Castillo de Pelegrina) is a castle located in Sigüenza, Spain. It was declared Bien de Interés Cultural in 1949.
