= Church of San Miguel (Cogolludo) =

- Iglesia de San Miguel (Spanish)
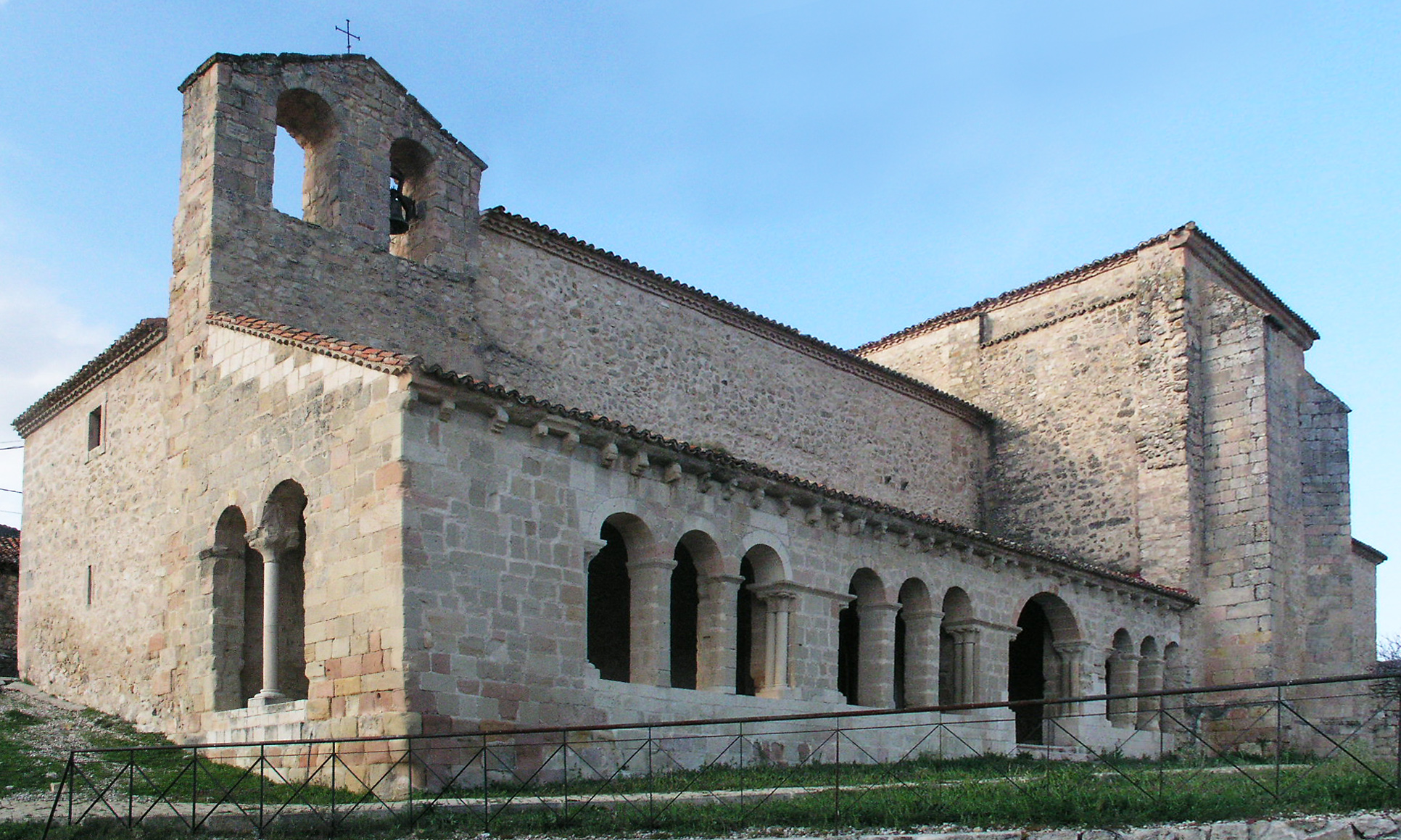

- Location within Spain
- 40.925666°N 3.189029°W
- Location: Cogolludo, Spain

Spanish Cultural Heritage
- Official name: Iglesia de San Miguel
- Type: Non-movable
- Criteria: Monument
- Designated: 1991
- Reference no.: RI-51-0007131

The Church of San Miguel (Spanish: Iglesia de San Miguel) is a Catholic church located in Cogolludo, Spain. It was declared Bien de Interés Cultural in 1991.
