= Church of San Bartolomé (Campisábalos) =

- Iglesia de San Bartolomé (Spanish)
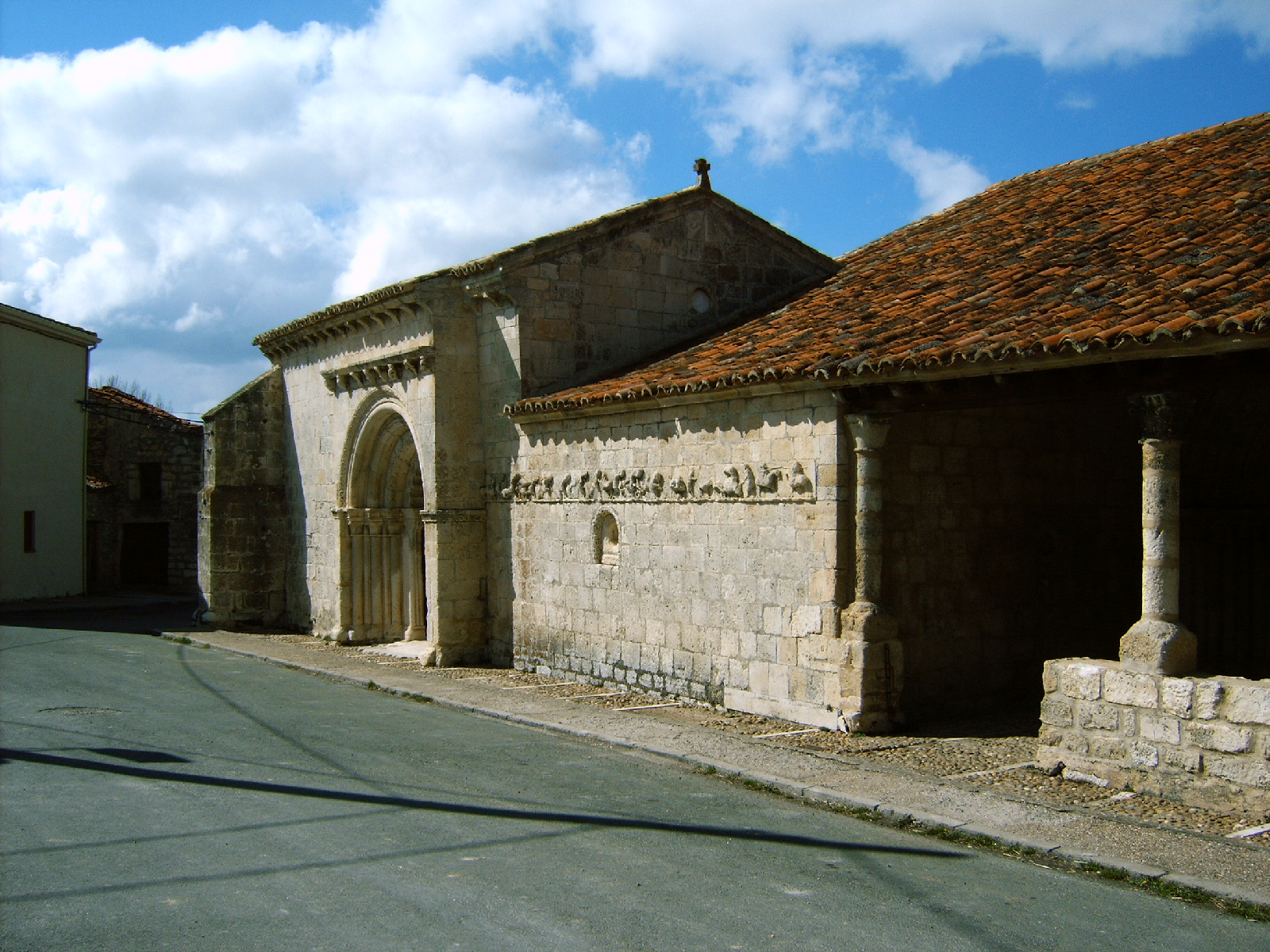

- Location within Spain
- 41.267427°N 3.145915°W
- Location: Campisábalos, Spain

Spanish Cultural Heritage
- Official name: Iglesia de San Bartolomé
- Type: Non-movable
- Criteria: Monument
- Designated: 1965
- Reference no.: RI-51-0001643

The Church of San Bartolomé (Spanish: Iglesia de San Bartolomé) is a Roman Catholic church located in Campisábalos, Spain. It was declared Bien de Interés Cultural in 1965.

The church was erected in Romanesque-style during the 12th and 13th-centuries.
