= Church of El Salvador (Carabias) =

- Iglesia del Salvador (Spanish)
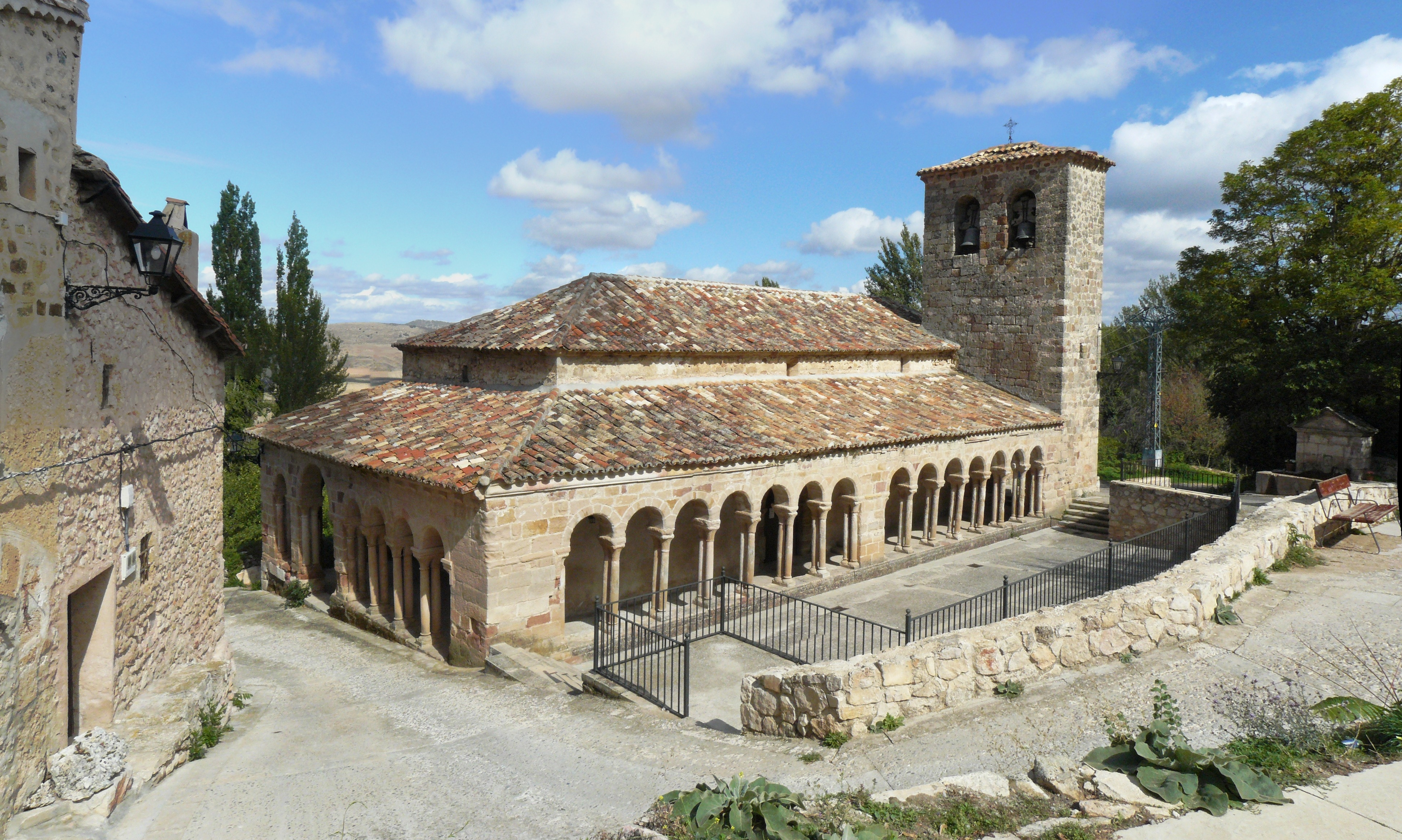
- Church of El Salvador

- Location within Spain
- 41.090123°N 2.717593°W
- Location: Sigüenza, Spain

Spanish Cultural Heritage
- Official name: Iglesia del Salvador
- Type: Non-movable
- Criteria: Monument
- Designated: 1965
- Reference no.: RI-51-0001644

The Church of El Salvador (Spanish: Iglesia del Salvador) is a Roman Catholic church located in Carabias, a settlement in the municipality of Sigüenza, Spain. The stone church was built in a rustic Romanesque style. It was declared Bien de Interés Cultural in 1965.
