= Convent of las Carmelitas de San José =

- Convento de las Carmelitas de San José (Spanish)
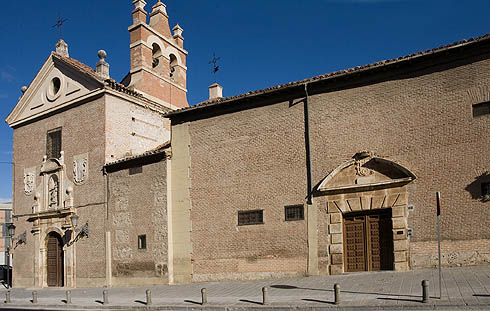

- Location within Spain
- 40.635089°N 3.164181°W
- Location: Guadalajara, Spain

Spanish Cultural Heritage
- Official name: Convento de las Carmelitas de San José
- Type: Non-movable
- Criteria: Monument
- Designated: 1992
- Reference no.: RI-51-0007279

The Convent of las Carmelitas de San José (Spanish: Convento de las Carmelitas de San José) is a Carmelite convent located in Guadalajara, Spain. It was declared Bien de Interés Cultural in 1992.
