= Church of Santiago Apóstol (Villa del Prado) =

Cultural property in Villa del Prado, Spain

- Iglesia Parroquial de Santiago Apóstol (Spanish)
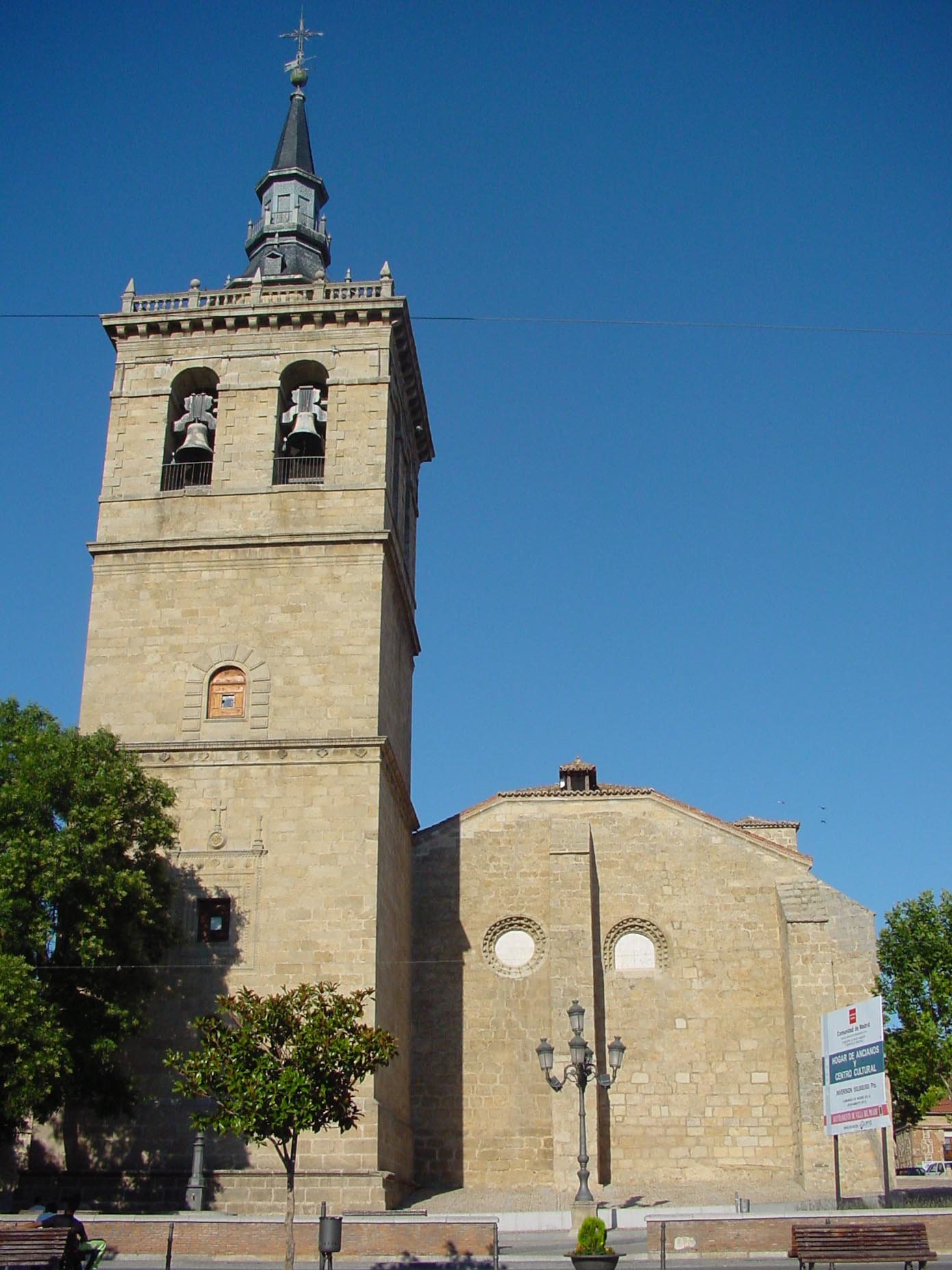

- Location within Spain
- 40.27629°N 4.305161°W
- Location: Villa del Prado, Spain

Spanish Cultural Heritage
- Official name: Iglesia Parroquial de Santiago Apóstol
- Type: Non-movable
- Criteria: Monument
- Designated: 1981
- Reference no.: RI-51-0004453

The Church of Santiago Apóstol (Spanish: Iglesia Parroquial de Santiago Apóstol) is a church located in Villa del Prado, Spain. It was declared Bien de Interés Cultural in 1981.
