= Chapel of Luis de Lucena =

- Capilla de Luis de Lucena (Spanish)
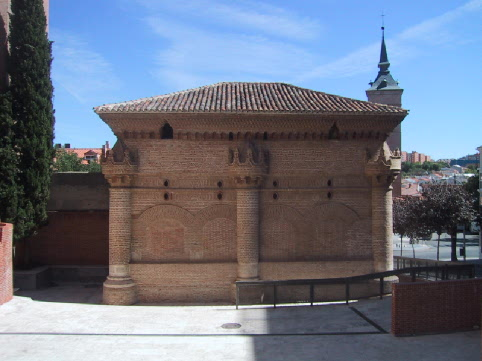

- Location within Spain
- 40.635222°N 3.161975°W
- Location: Guadalajara, Spain

Spanish Cultural Heritage
- Official name: Capilla de Luis de Lucena
- Type: Non-movable
- Criteria: Monument
- Designated: 1914
- Reference no.: RI-51-0000133

The Chapel of Luis de Lucena (Spanish: Capilla de Luis de Lucena o de las Urbinas) is a chapel located in Guadalajara, Spain. It was declared Bien de Interés Cultural in 1914.
