= Church of Santiago (Lorca) =

Church in Lorca, Spain

Coordinates: 37°40′38″N 1°41′53″W

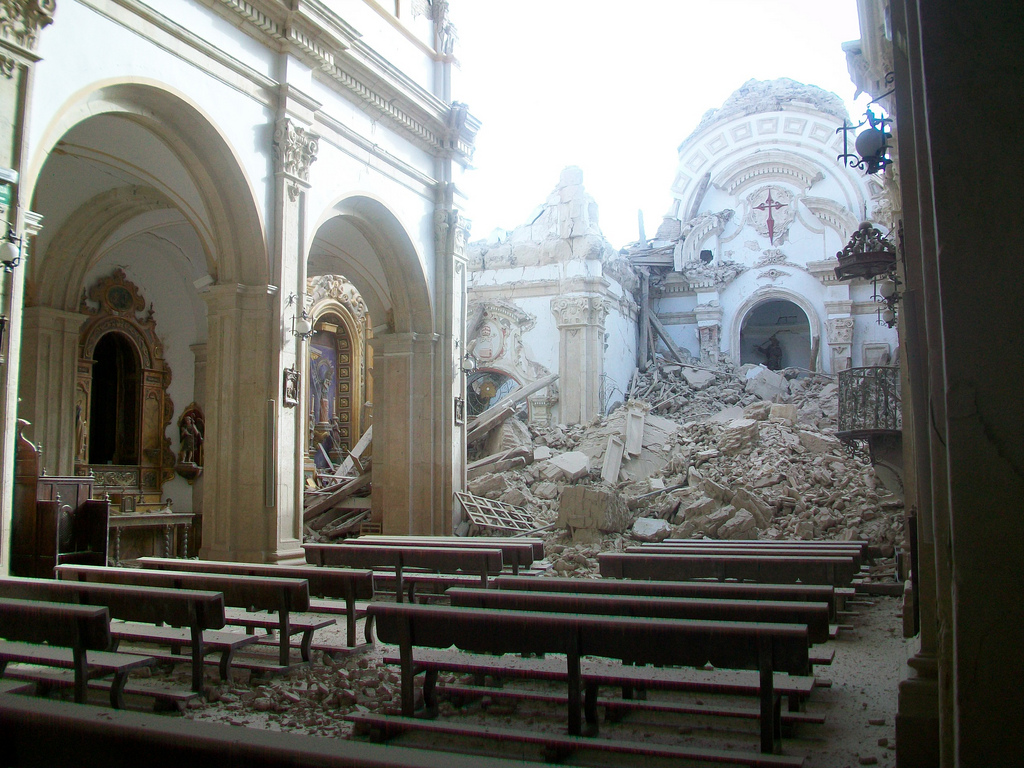
The church damaged

The Church of Santiago (St James) is a church located in Lorca, Spain. It was damaged in the 2011 Lorca earthquake.

== History of earthquakes ==
The Church of Santiago de Lorca was destroyed by a 5.1 magnitude earthquake on May 11, 2011, in Spain. It was suggested that the fault has given rise to unusual earthquakes, posing a threat and potential hazard to people living in the region. According to new research, at least six earthquakes registering above a seven on the Richter magnitude scale have struck the Spanish fault in recent history.

=== Earthquake of 2011 ===
During the 2011 earthquake in Santiago, the collapse of the Church resulted in the complete destruction of domes, roofs and vaults. The building had undergone previous reconstruction efforts prior to the 2011 earthquake, including the addition of a compression layer of a mesh-reinforced concrete that increased its mass. It is suggested that this kind of intervention increased the damages to the walls and caused the roof to collapse.
