= Millana =

Millana, Spain
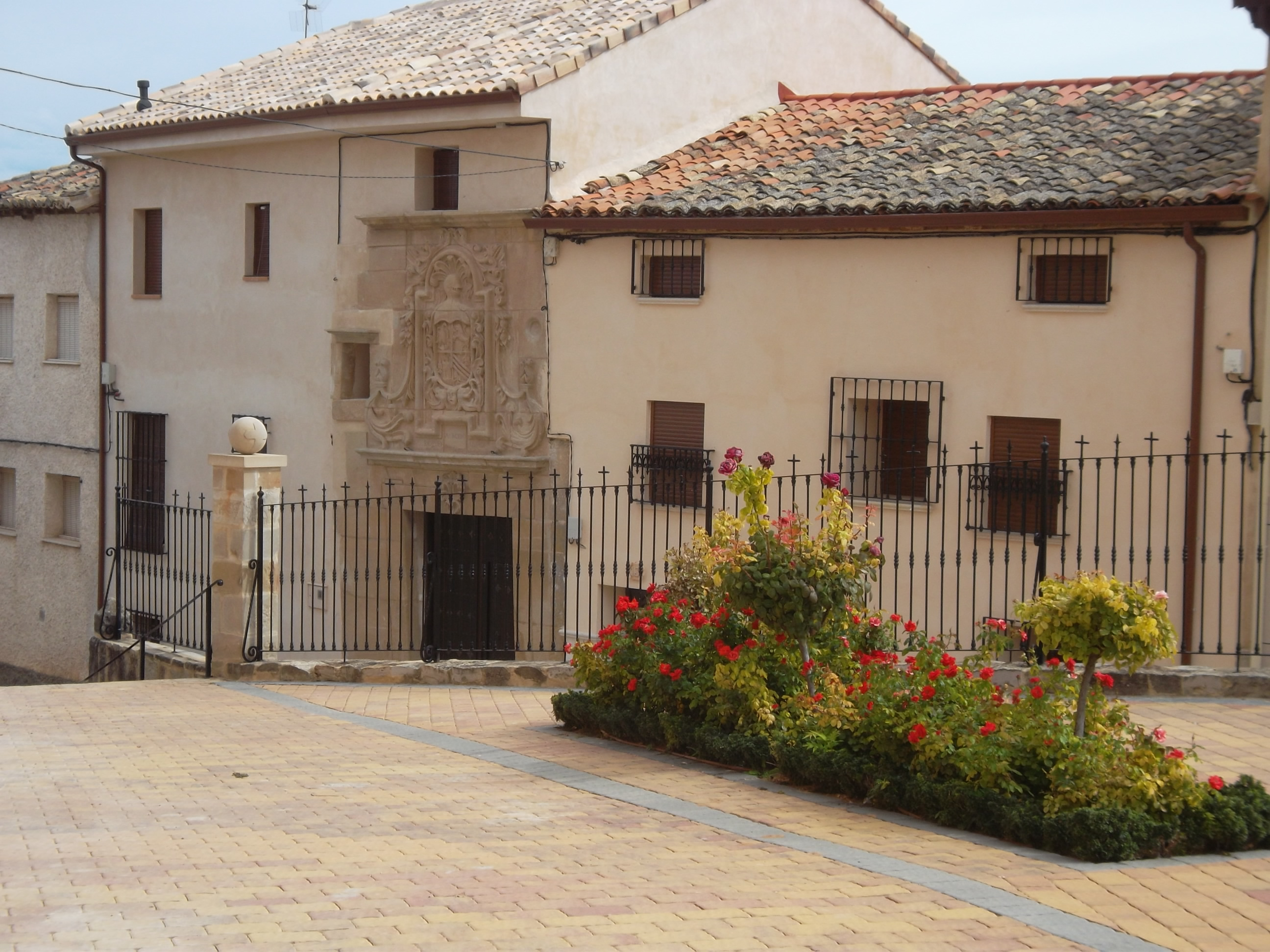
- Church of Santo Domingo de Silos in Millana.

- Coat of arms

- Location within Province of Guadalajara Location within Castilla-La Mancha Location within Spain
- Country: Spain
- Autonomous community: Castile-La Mancha
- Province: Guadalajara
- Municipality: Millana

Area
  - Total: 27 km^{2} (10 sq mi)

Population (2025-01-01)
  - Total: 126
  - Density: 4.7/km^{2} (12/sq mi)
- Time zone: UTC+1 (CET)
  - Summer (DST): UTC+2 (CEST)

Millana is a municipality located in the province of Guadalajara, Castile-La Mancha, Spain. According to the 2004 census (INE), the municipality had a population of 158 inhabitants.

Millana's Church of Santo Domingo de Silos is included on Spain's heritage register, in the category Bien de Interés Cultural.
