= Hermitage of Santa Coloma de Albendiego =

- Ermita de Santa Coloma de Albendiego (Spanish)
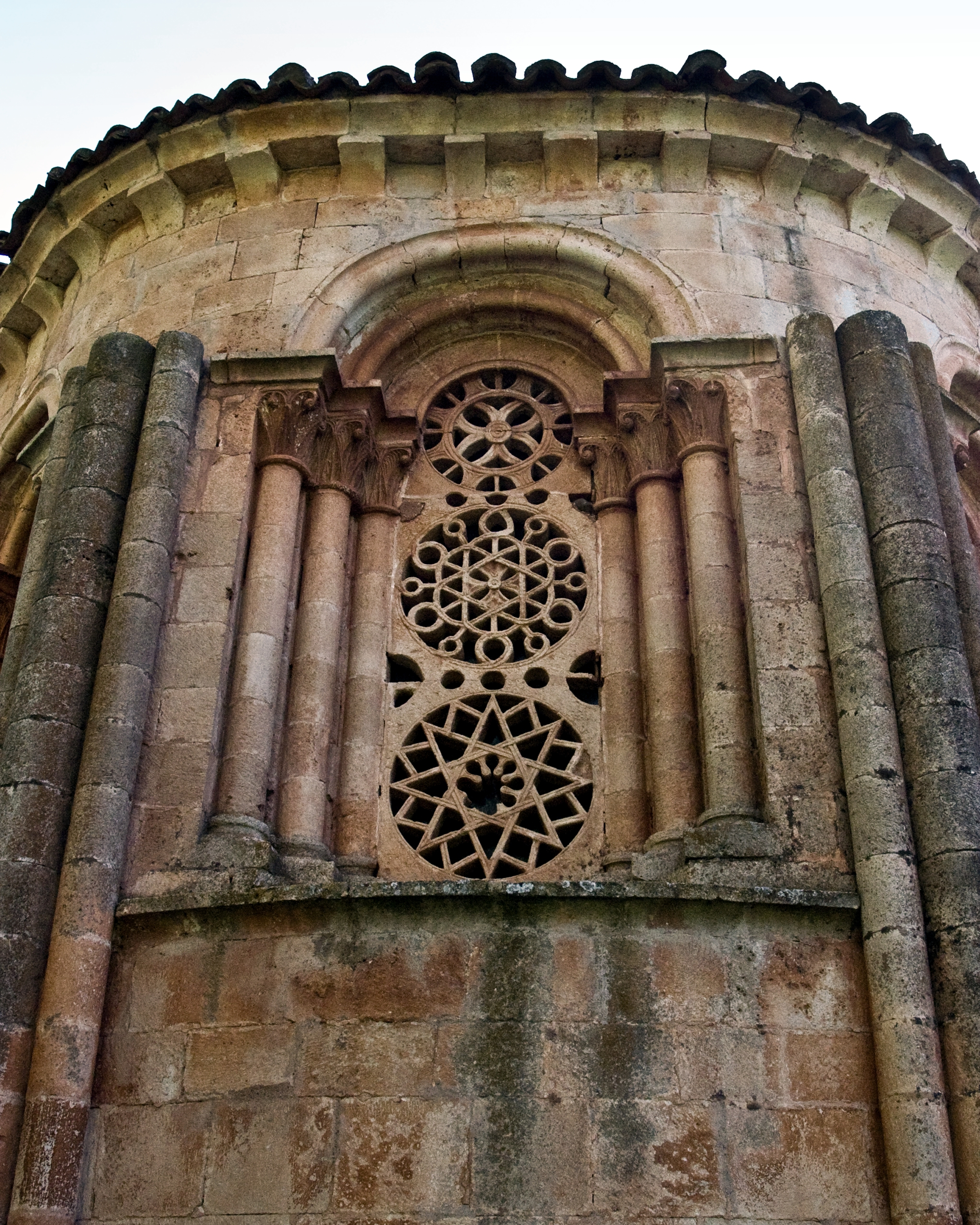

- Location within Spain
- 41.225556°N 3.045833°W
- Location: Albendiego, Spain

Spanish Cultural Heritage
- Official name: Ermita de Santa Coloma de Albendiego
- Type: Non-movable
- Criteria: Monument
- Designated: 1965
- Reference no.: RI-51-0001642

The Hermitage of Santa Coloma de Albendiego (Spanish: Ermita de Santa Coloma de Albendiego) is a hermitage located in Albendiego, Spain. It was declared a Bien de Interés Cultural in 1965.
