= San Antonio de Padua, Avilés =

San Antonio de Padua Church (Avilés)
- San Antonio de Padua (Padres Franciscanos)
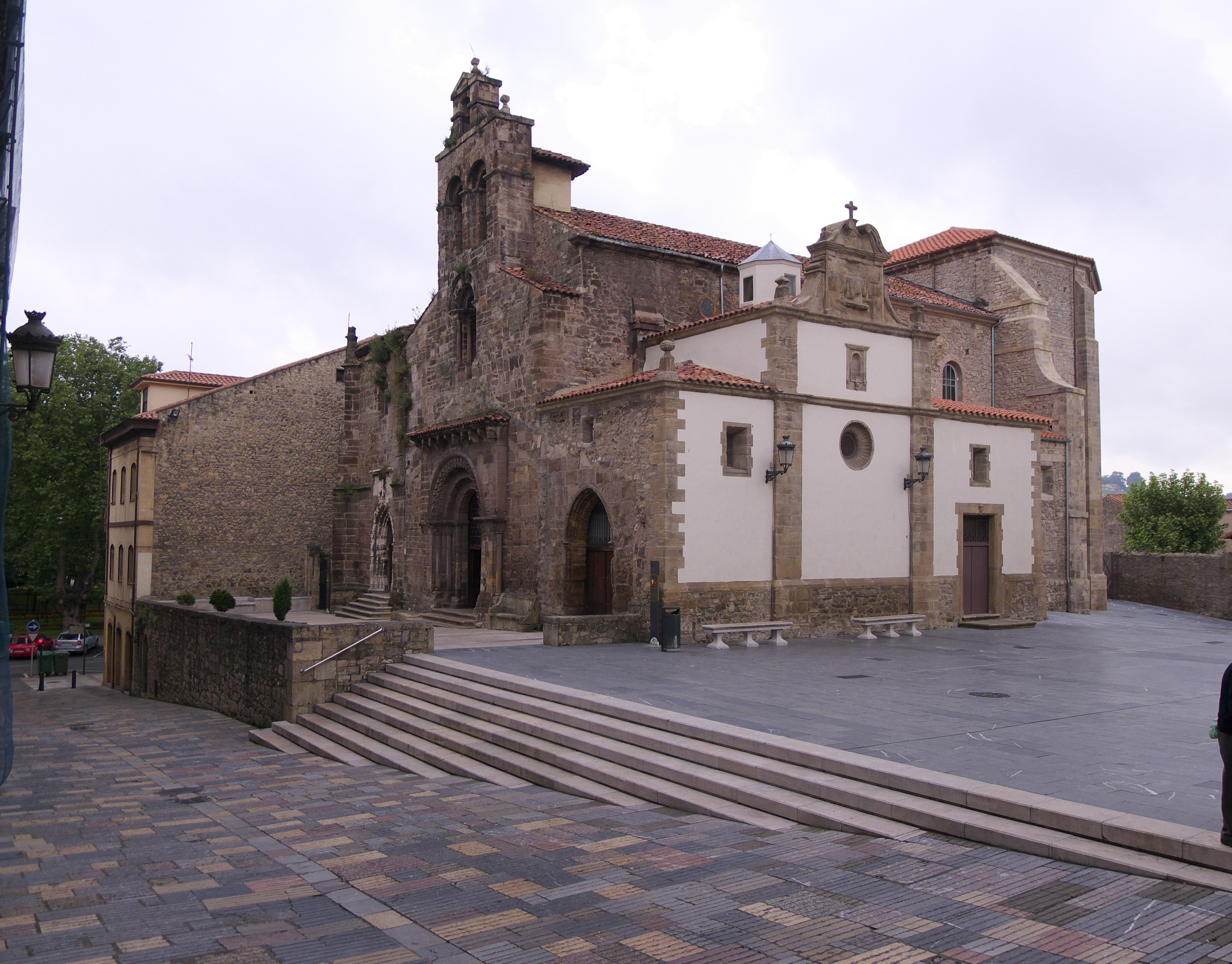

- Location within Spain
- 43°33′26.5″N 5°55′16.2″W
- Location: Asturias, Spain
- Country: Spain

History
- Founded: 12th-13th centuries

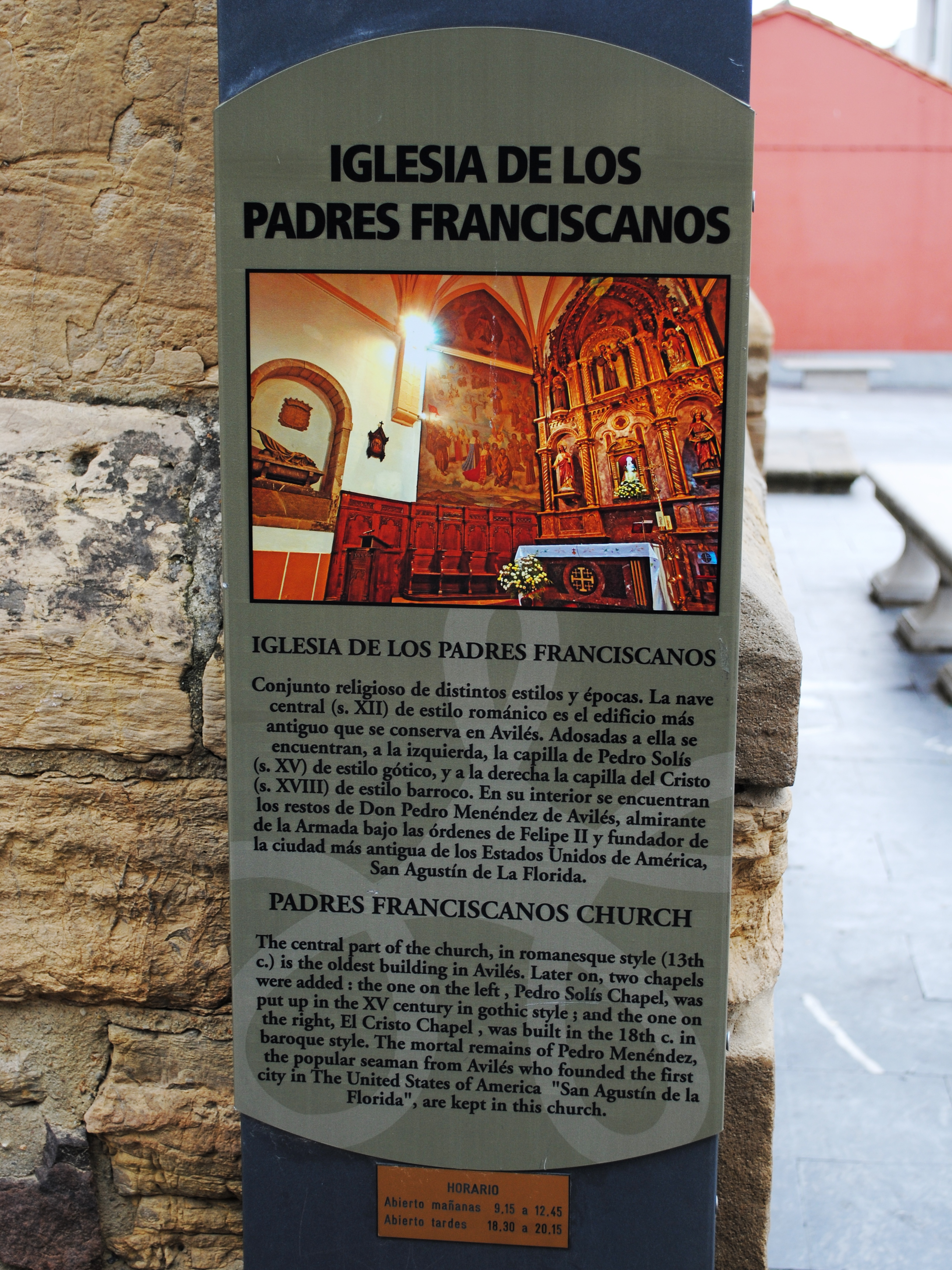
Tourist information

San Antonio de Padua is a Romanesque-style Franciscan church in Avilés, community of Asturias, Spain. Also known as the Church of the Franciscan Fathers, Franciscan monks lived in and ran the church from 1919 until 2013. It is the oldest preserved building in Avilés.

The tomb of Pedro Menéndez de Avilés, the founder of St. Augustine, Florida is located inside the church.

== See also ==
- Asturian art
- Catholic Church in Spain
