= Llorca =

Llorca is a surname. Notable people with the surname include:

- José Pedro Pérez-Llorca (born 1940), Spanish politician
- Ricardo Llorca (born 1962), Spanish composer
- Rubén Torres Llorca (born 1957), Cuban-American artist
- Samuel Llorca Ripoll (born 1985), Spanish footballer
- Álex Llorca Castillo (born 1989), Spanish basketball player
- Lucía Cortez Llorca (born 2000), Spanish tennis player

== See also ==
- Lorca (disambiguation)
