= Castle of Lorca =

Building in Lorca, Murcia, Spain

Coordinates: 37°40′39″N 1°42′21″W

- Castillo de Lorca
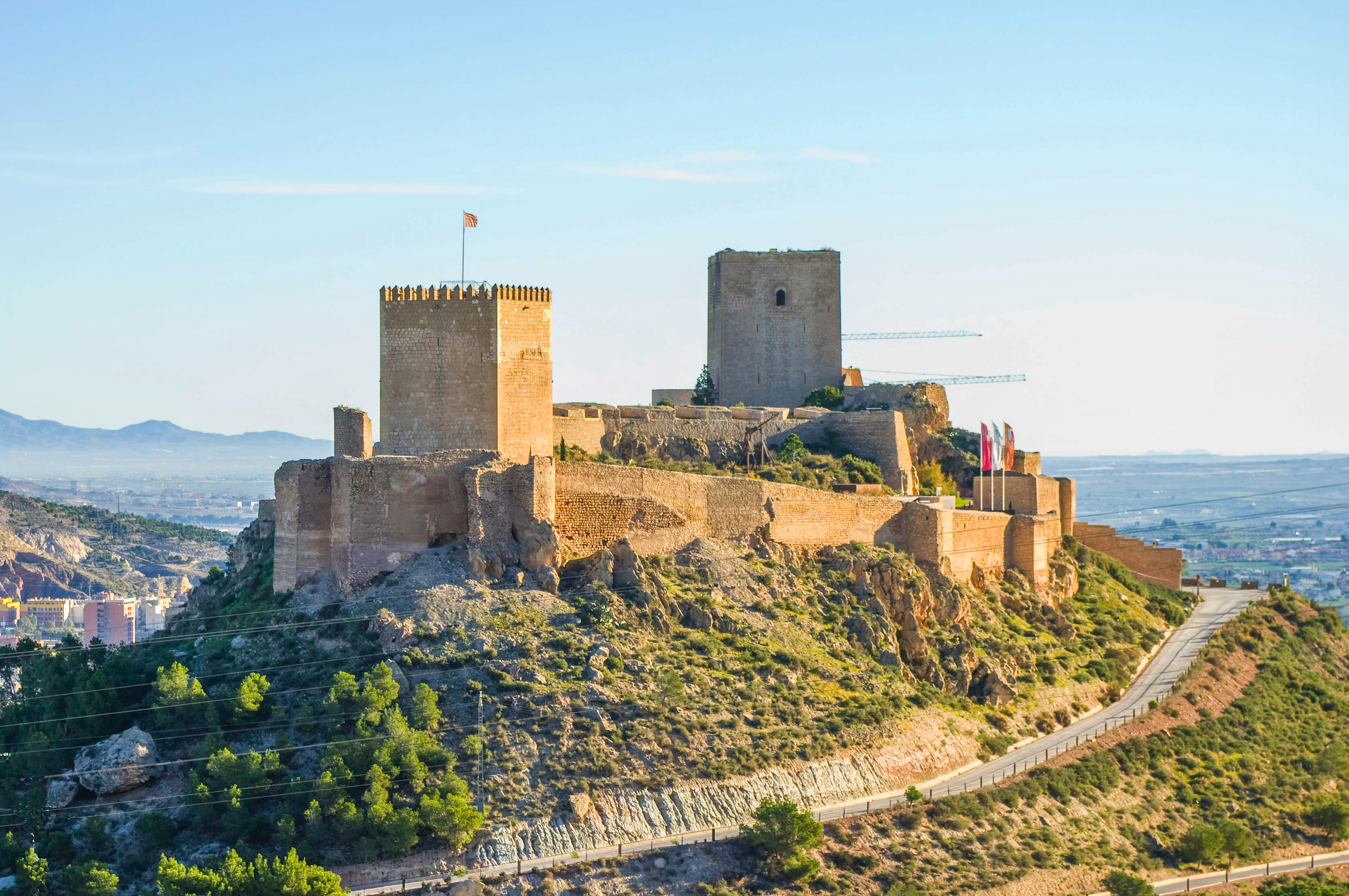
- Interactive map of the Castle of Lorca area
- Alternative names: Parador de Lorca
- Hotel chain: Paradores

General information
- Location: Lorca (Murcia), Spain

Website
- Parador de Lorca

Castle of Lorca (Spanish: Castillo de Lorca) in Lorca, Murcia, Spain, is a fortress of medieval origin constructed between the 9th and 15th centuries. It consists of a series of defensive structures that, during the Middle Ages, made the town and the fortress an impregnable point in the southeast part of the Iberian Peninsula. Lorca Castle was a key strategic point of contention between Christians and Muslims during the Reconquista. It is listed as a Site of Cultural Interest.

It is 640 m long and 120 m wide, and one of the largest castles in Spain.

== History ==
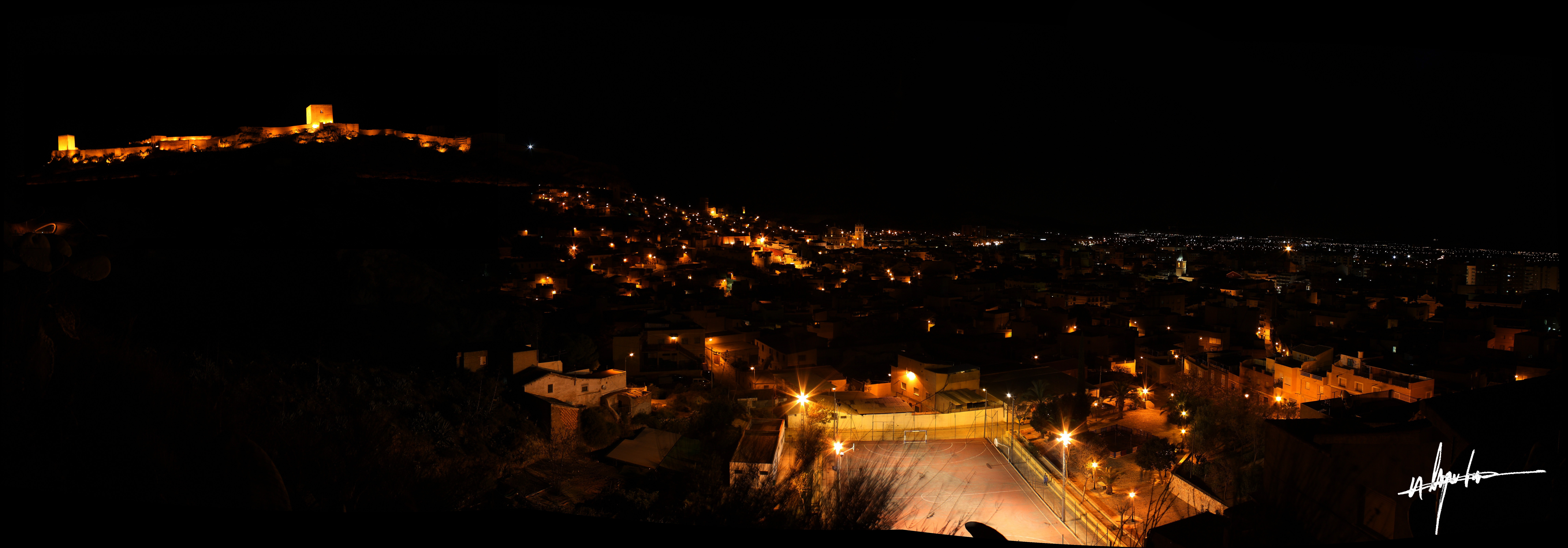
Panoramic view of the town and the castle at night

Archaeological excavations have revealed that the site of the castle has been inhabited since Neolithic times. There were archaeological excavations conducted between 1999 and 2011, in conjunction with other excavations conducted in the centre of the town of Lorca. The excavations revealed the existence of an Argaric town that extended from the castle to the actual site of the current town. The excavations revealed funerary sites, homes, and a wall.

It has not been determined exactly when a castle or fortress was first built on the hill. The first written documentation referring to a castle at Lorca is of Muslim origin, which in the 9th century, indicates that the city of Lurqa was an important town in the area ruled by Theudimer (Tudmir), who ruled seven cities in southeastern Spain, mentioned in the Treaty of Orihuela that was preserved by the Andalusian historian Ibn Adarí in the thirteenth century: Orihuela, Valentila (possibly an equivalent for Valencia), Alicante, Mula, Bigastro, Eyya (probably Ojós), and Lorca.

During Muslim rule, Lorca Castle was an impregnable fortress and its interior was divided into two sections by the Espaldón Wall. In the western part, there was an area used to protect livestock and grain in times of danger. The eastern part had a neighbourhood called the barrio de Alcalá.

Lorca was conquered by the Castilian Infante Don Alfonso, the future Alfonso X, in 1244, and the fortress became a key defensive point against the Kingdom of Granada. For 250 years, Lorca Castle was a watchpoint on the border between the Christian kingdom of Murcia and the Muslim state of Granada.

Due to this geographic position, the Castilian monarchs repopulated the town and maintained the defensive structures of Lorca.

Alfonso X ordered:

...por saber que he de poblar los alcaçares et la villa de Lorca de christianos que yo gane de moros... et porque ayan mas et mas do et otorgo a todos los christianos vezinos et moradores en los alcaçares et en la villa de Lorca [...] casas mayores hy pobladas con sus cuerpos [...] todas cosas pora siempre et jamas

Alfonso X ordered the construction of the towers known as the Alfonsina and Espolón Towers, and strengthened and fixed the walls. Hardly a trace of the Muslim fortress remained due to this reconstruction. Muslim traces remain in the foundation stones and the wall known as the muro del Espaldón.

The neighbourhood of Alcalá, at the base of the castle, was repopulated after the Reconquista and during construction of the hotel, the Parador de Nacional de Turismo, the remains of the Jewish quarter (Judería) of Lorca, of 14th-century origin, were found.

The Jewish Quarter was found within the alcazaba, the Moorish fortification, separated from the rest of the city by its walls. The physical separation had the purpose of protecting the Jewish people in the town from harm, but also had the result of keeping Christians and Jews separate, with the Christians inhabiting the lower part of town.

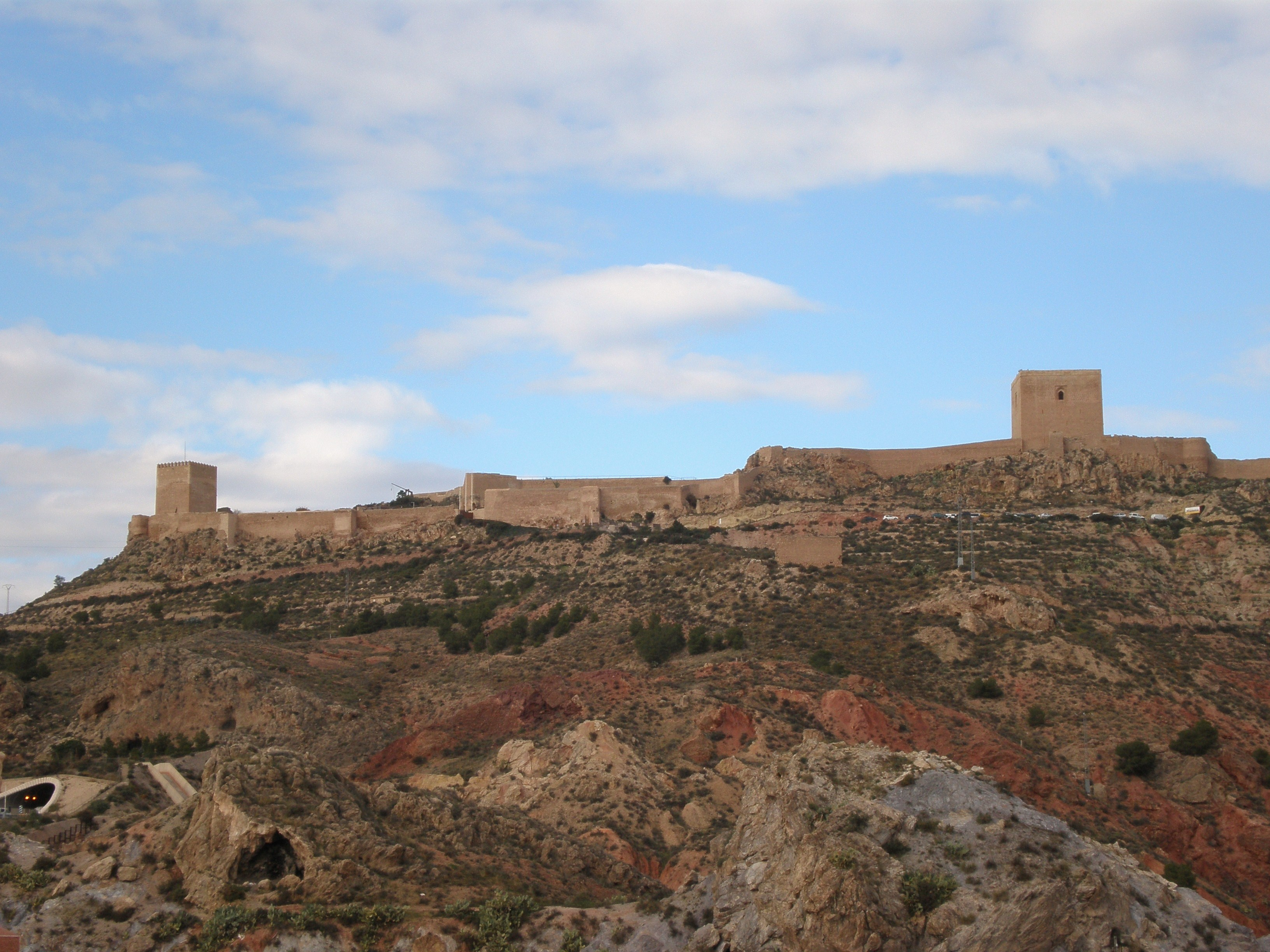
Fortaleza del Sol.

The remains of the Jewish Quarter extended over an area of 5,700 square m, and 12 homes and a synagogue have been found; the synagogue dates from the 14th century and is the only one found in the Murcia. The streets of the town had an irregular layout, adapted to the landscape, and is divided into four terraces. The synagogue was in the central location, and around it were the homes. The homes were of rectangular shape, with various compartmentalized rooms. The living quarters were elevated and a common feature was benches attached to the walls, kitchens, stand for earthenware jars, or cupboards.

The angular stone found in the archaeological excavation is associated with the synagogue. It is found, partially excavated, in the floor to gain height in the interior while on the outside not exceeding in height the rest of the building. In this manner, the building adhered to laws of the period.

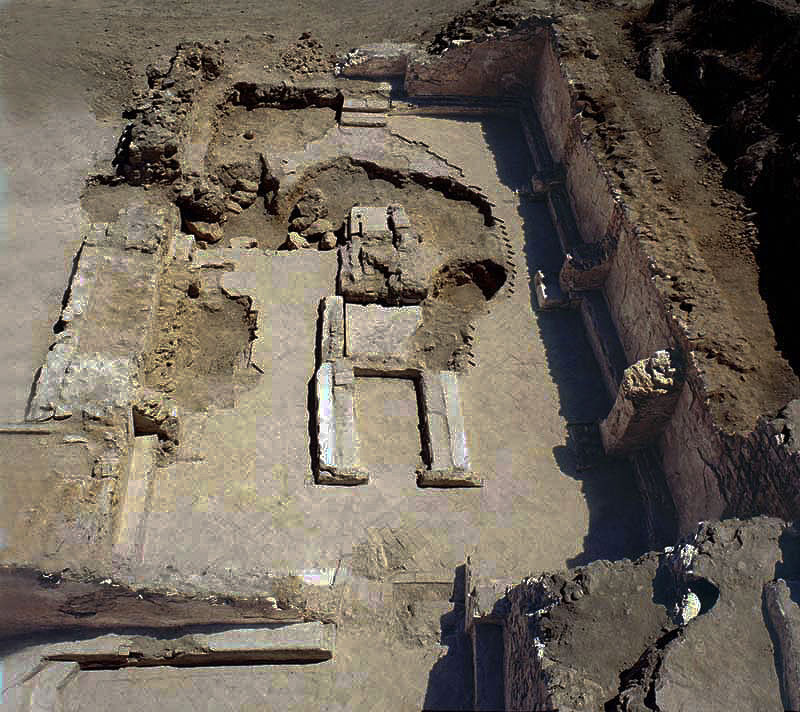
Excavation of the synagogue.

Access to the synagogue is available via a patio in whose side there are two corridors, and the area for women is accessed via a separate corridor. The interior of the synagogue conserves the place where the Torah was kept, and examples of yeseria of Gothic style. The plinth where the bimah was located has also survived, and along the perimeter of the interior of the temple were benches where the male worshippers would sit. The women had a separate area, known as the matroneum; in Lorca's synagogue the matroneum was located above the vestibule.

With the disappearance of the frontier after the conquest of Granada in 1492, Lorca Castle no longer became as important as before. With the expulsion of the Jews by order of Ferdinand and Isabella, Lorca Castle was also depopulated as a result. The castle was abandoned completely, and was almost a complete ruin by the 18th century. In the 19th century, the castle was refurbished due to the War of Spanish Independence. The walls and structures were repaired or modified and its medieval look changed. A battery of cannons was installed, for example, during this time. On 4 June 1931 Lorca Castle was declared a National Historic Monument and on 5 March the historic centre of Lorca including the castle was declared a Conjunto Histórico-Artístico (Historic-Artistic Group).

The wall of the castle and the Espolón Tower were seriously damaged during the 2011 Lorca earthquake.

== Lorca Taller del Tiempo ==
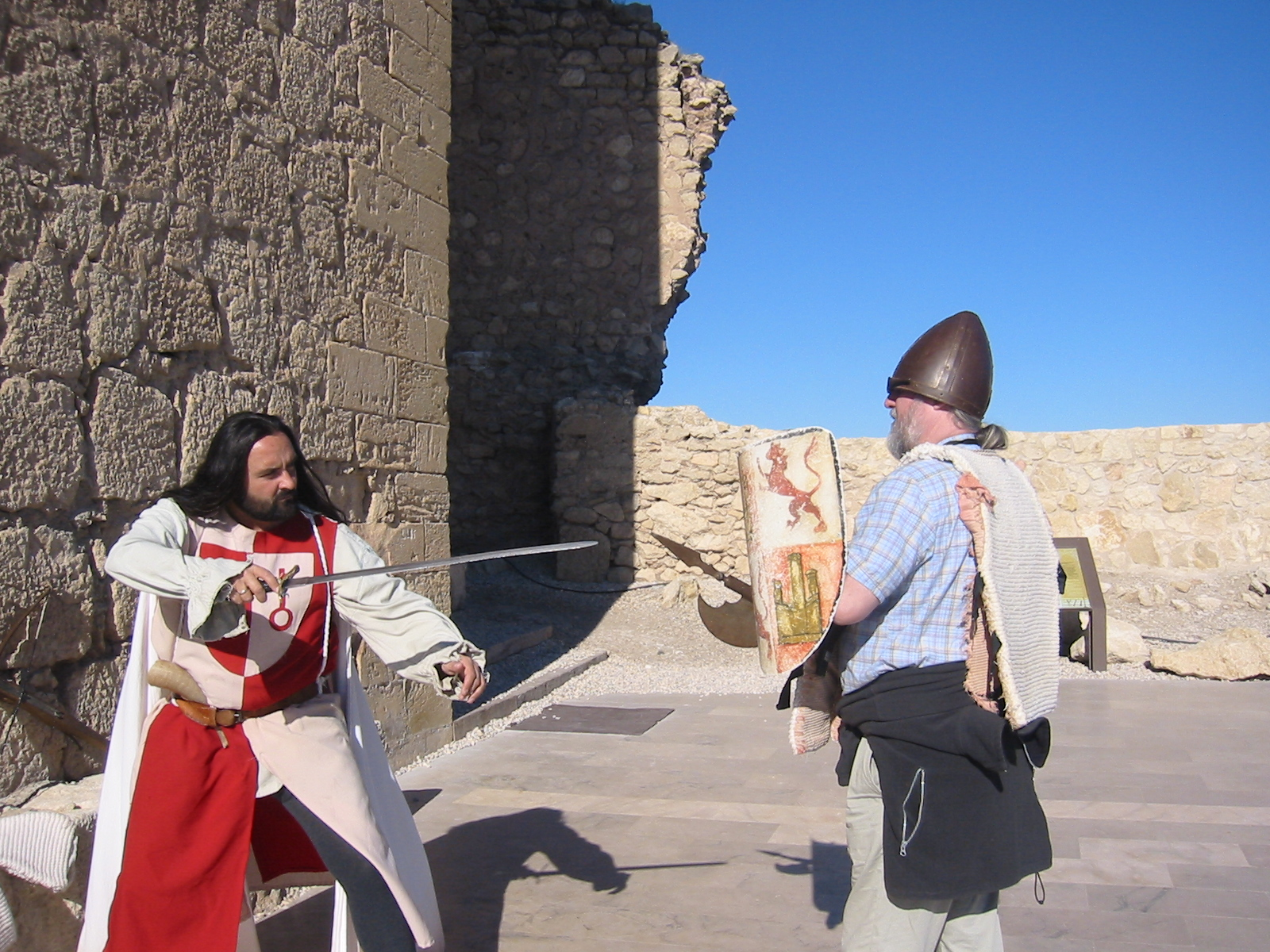
Medieval re-enactment for the "Lorca Taller del Tiempo" in Lorca Castle.

Lorca Taller del Tiempo ("Lorca Time Workshop") is a company that uses the castle as a theme park for medieval re-enactments and includes a touristic train that travels throughout the city, departing from the Visitor Centre (formerly the Convent of La Merced).

== Parador ==
Currently, a parador (luxury hotel) has been built within the castle. As a result, archaeological discoveries have been found, including the Jewish Quarter.

== Sources ==
- Rosalía Sala Vallejo, Lorca y su historia (R. Sala Vallejo, 1998), ISBN 84-923615-0-6.
- VV.AA, Castillos de España (Everest, 1997), ISBN 84-241-3816-3.
