= Church of Santo Domingo de Silos (Millana) =

- Iglesia de Santo Domingo de Silos (Spanish)
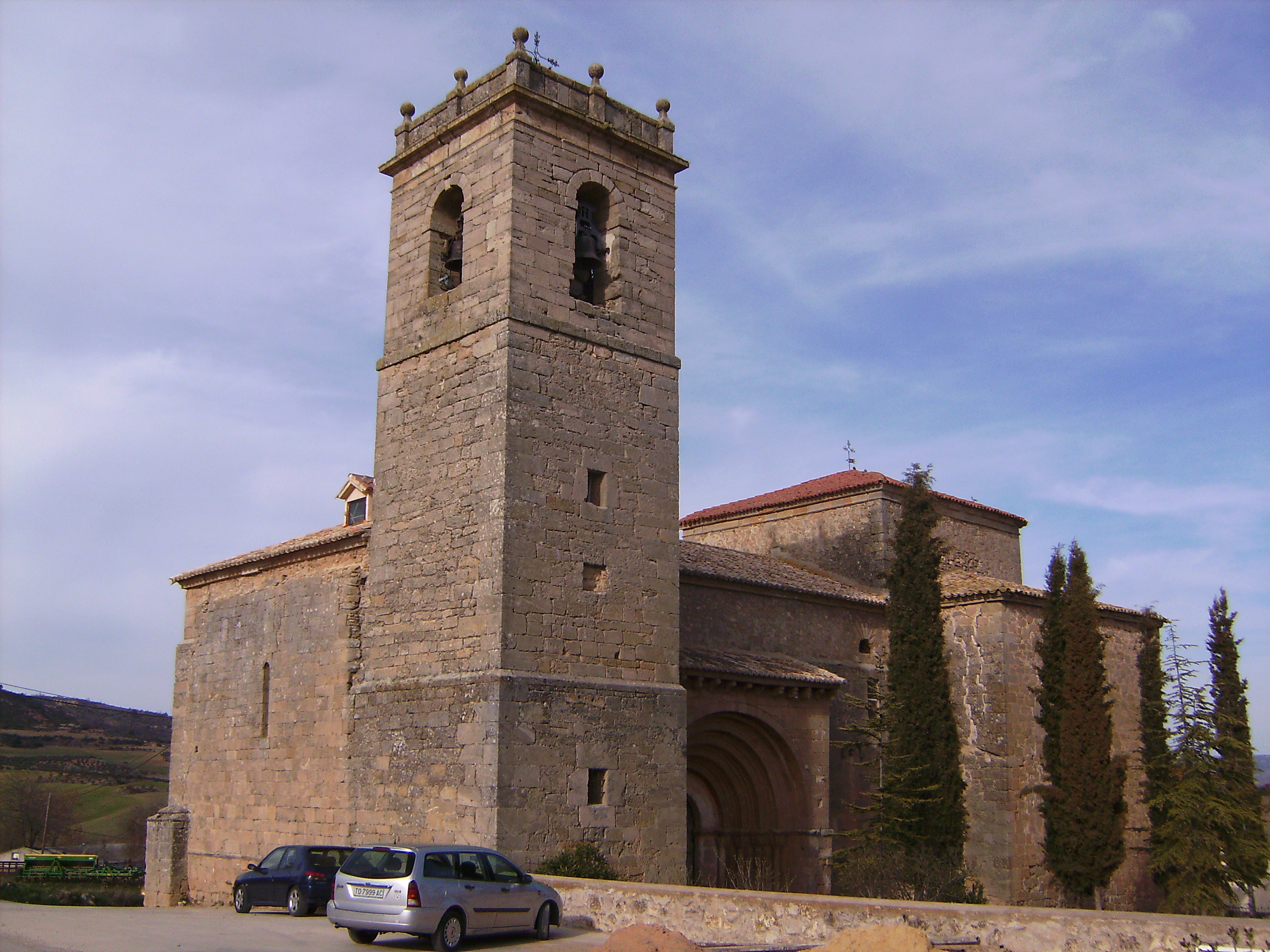

- Location within Spain
- 40.507369°N 2.572175°W
- Location: Millana, Spain

Spanish Cultural Heritage
- Official name: Iglesia de Santo Domingo de Silos
- Type: Non-movable
- Criteria: Monument
- Designated: 1992
- Reference no.: RI-51-0007283

The Church of Santo Domingo de Silos (Spanish: Iglesia de Santo Domingo de Silos) is a church located in Millana, Spain. It was declared Bien de Interés Cultural in 1992.
