= Church of Santiago el Mayor (Guadalajara) =

- Iglesia de Santiago el Mayor (Spanish)
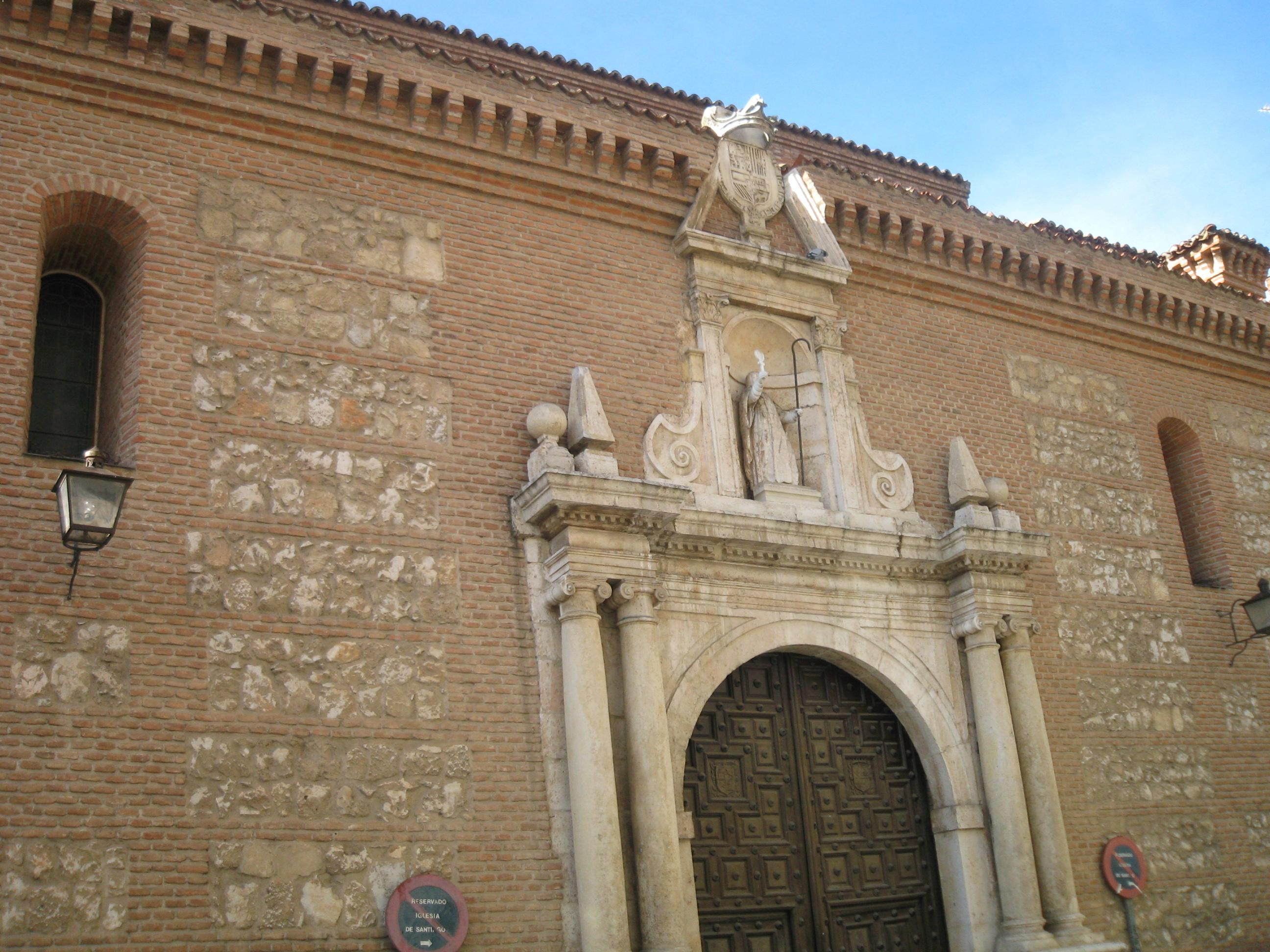

- Location within Spain
- 40.635359°N 3.167464°W
- Location: Guadalajara, Spain

Spanish Cultural Heritage
- Official name: Iglesia de Santiago el Mayor
- Type: Non-movable
- Criteria: Monument
- Designated: 1946
- Reference no.: RI-51-0001175

The Church of Santiago el Mayor (Spanish: Iglesia de Santiago el Mayor) is a church located in Guadalajara, Spain. The church was built in the 14th century, and was declared Bien de Interés Cultural in 1946.
