= Church of San Nicolás (Guadalajara) =

- Iglesia de San Nicolás (Spanish)
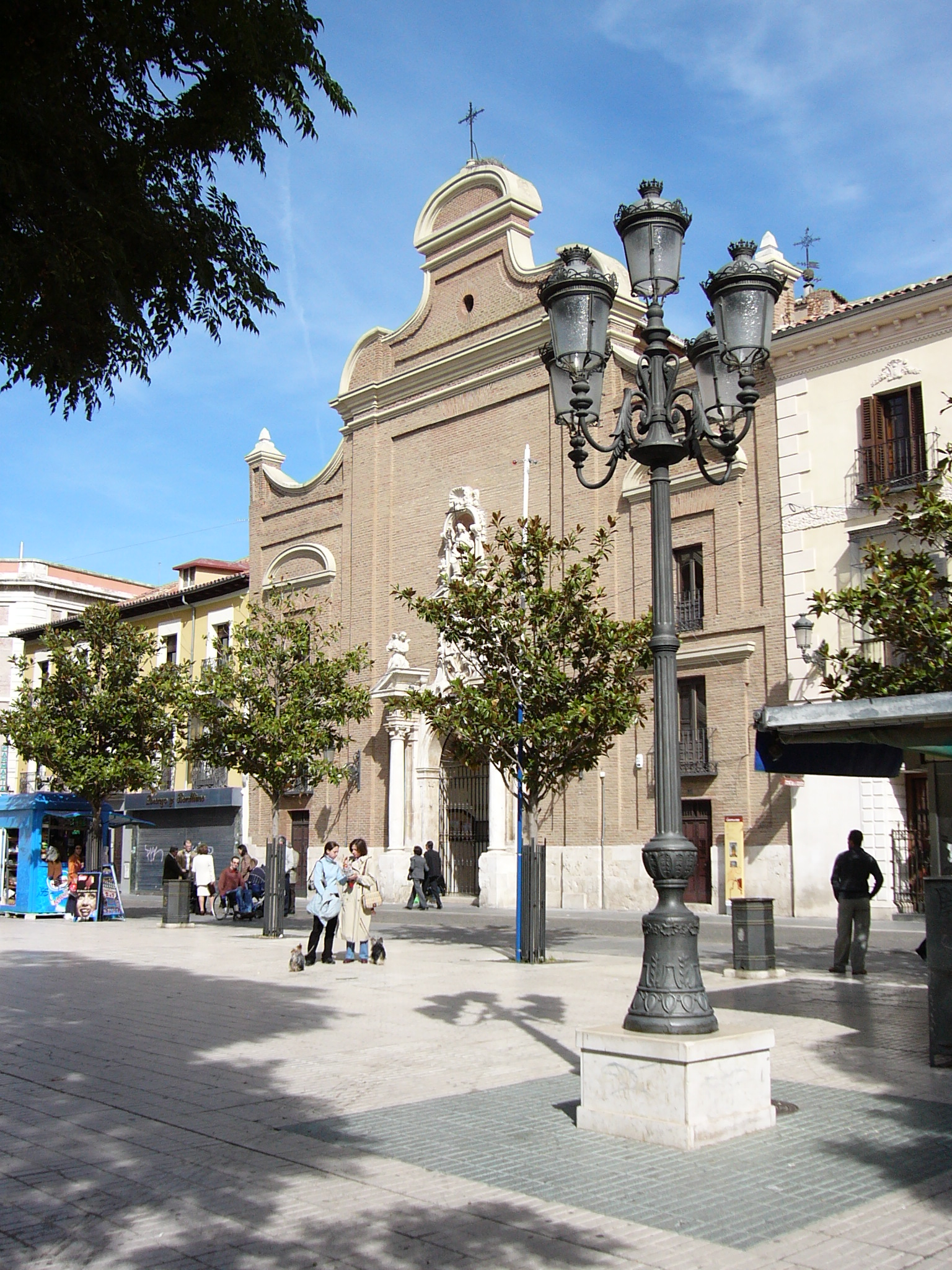

- Location within Spain
- 40.632674°N 3.165863°W
- Location: Guadalajara, Spain

Spanish Cultural Heritage
- Official name: Iglesia de San Nicolás
- Type: Non-movable
- Criteria: Monument
- Designated: 1981
- Reference no.: RI-51-0004528

The Church of San Nicolás (Spanish: Iglesia de San Nicolás) is a church located in Guadalajara, Spain. It was declared Bien de Interés Cultural in 1981.
