= Maratón de los Cuentos =

Storytelling Marathon of Guadalajara
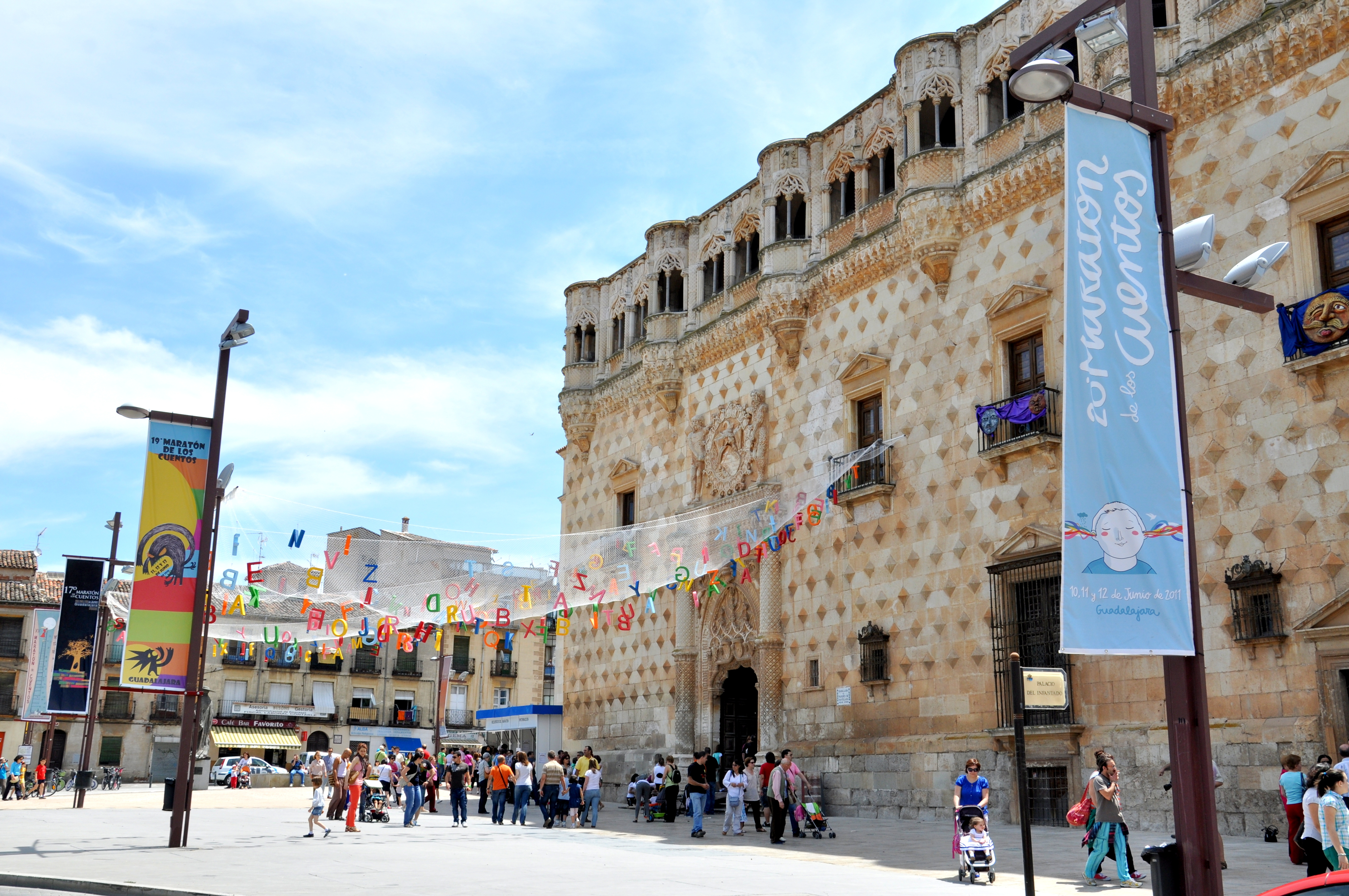
- Genre: Festival de oral tradition
- Dates: Second or third weekend of June
- Begins: 1992
- Locations: Palacio del Infantado; Guadalajara (Spain)
- Participants: 1679 (2017)
- Organiser: Biblioteca Pública de Guadalajara
- Website: Official page event - MaratondelosCuentos.org

The Maratón de los Cuentos (Storytelling Marathon) is an oral narration that takes place every year in the palacio del Infantado de Guadalajara (Spain) during the second or third weekend of June. The festival gather storytellers or cuentacuentos from around the world who narrate uninterruptedly stories over the weekend. Started in 1992, the Maratón de los Cuentos of Guadalajara is celebrated every year since then. It reached its twentieth edition in 2011 achieving 46 hours of storytelling without interruption. It brings together 200 volunteers who help develop more than 70 activities.

== History ==
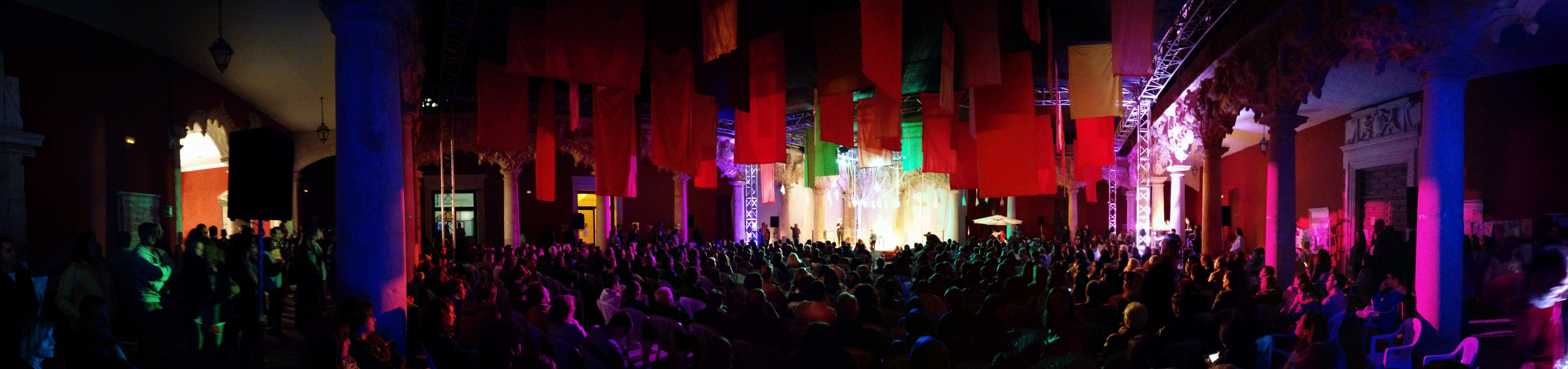
The Maratón de los Cuentos does not stop and the evening is when a greater influx of spectators attends.

The Marathon was born as one of the projects created by Blanca Calvo, director of the Library of Guadalajara, when in 1982 she promoted the Seminary of Children and Youth Literature of Guadalajara, which in addition to the Marathon organized the National Encounters of Animation of Reading between 1984 and 1996

The first edition was held on April 23, 1992, as part of the activities program of the Guadalajara Book Fair, which included oral narration. That first edition lasted 24 hours, from 12 noon on Friday to 12 on Saturday, with the goal in turn to enter the Guinness Book of Records. In this marathon participated personalities such as Antonio Buero Vallejo and José Luis Sampedro.

In 1993 the Marathon was held for the first time in the palace of the Infantado and reached 36 and a half hours.

Since then, and thanks to the collaboration of the Seminary of Children and Youth Literature of Guadalajara, it ended up defining what is now known as the "Marathon of the Tales of Guadalajara", which takes place in the courtyard of the Lions of the Palace of Infantado uninterrupted during the weekend.

In 2016 the festival reached a quarter of a century by telling stories and it is considered as the largest festival of oral narration, aimed at children and adults, adolescents, storytellers and curious in general and known as the world capital of the story. After 25 years, the festival declared to be working to be part of the Intangible Cultural Heritage of Humanity granted by UNESCO.

== Event locations ==
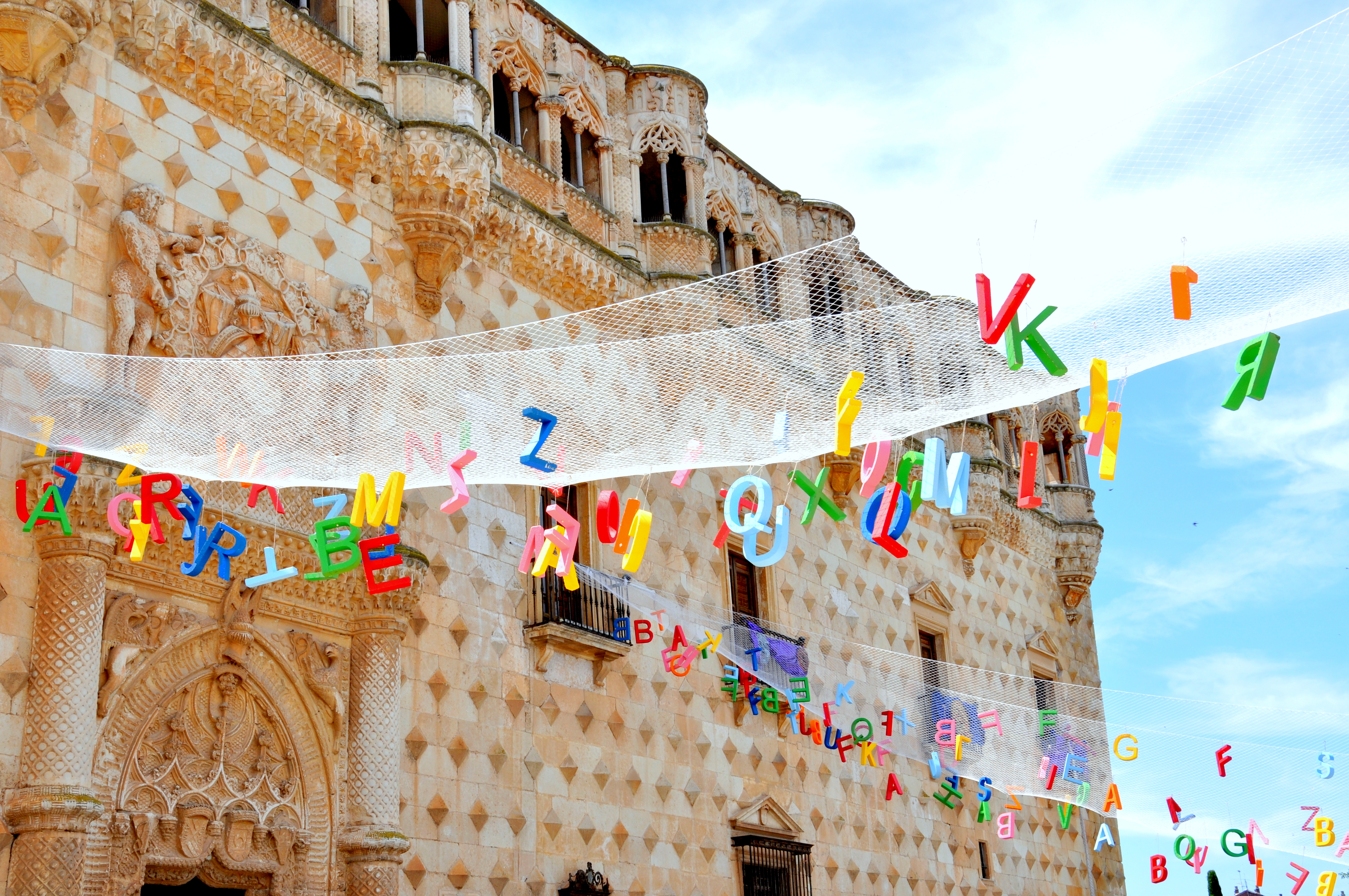
The palace of the Infantado is decorated for the occasion since it is the place where most of the Marathon activities are held, including oral narration.

The palace of the Infantado de Guadalajara has hosted the event since 1993 and is specially decorated for the occasion. Inside, in the Patio de los Leones, the main courtyard, the marathon of oral narration is developed as well as the marathon of illustration, and in the hall, a smaller courtyard at the entrance of the Palacio del Infantado is told stories by more accountants novices or more timid. The entrance hall also houses the main story marathon in case of bad weather, since this courtyard is interior which allows the marathon not to be suspended until its program ends on Sunday, when the concert of the end of the Marathon, also developed in the hall of the palace of the Infantado.

The gardens of the Palace of the Infantado host some activities, although mainly there are several stalls where you can buy books or stalls where you can buy traditional products or have tea. Also in front of the Palacio del Infantado are some stalls with the same objective, as well as activities and shows at different times.

The Plaza del Jardinillo de Guadalajara and the Plaza Mayor de Guadalajara as well as the main street also tend to host some activities and shows.

Among the locations of the event have also included the Chinese Hall of the Cotilla Palace, the Palace of Antonio de Mendoza (Liceo Caracense) or the crypt of the Church of San Francisco.

All locations participating in the event are decorated for the occasion.

== Marathons included in the event ==
There are different activities that are performed in parallel to the Maratón de los Cuentos, like the oral narration marathon, the illustration, radio and photography marathons.

=== Oral Narration marathon ===
Multitude of professional and non-professional storytellers participate during the event telling stories, either alone or accompanied, with or without musical accompaniment, singing or narrating, interpreting history without more, dressed especially for it or even camouflaged behind puppets or puppets, any option is possible.

=== Illustration marathon ===
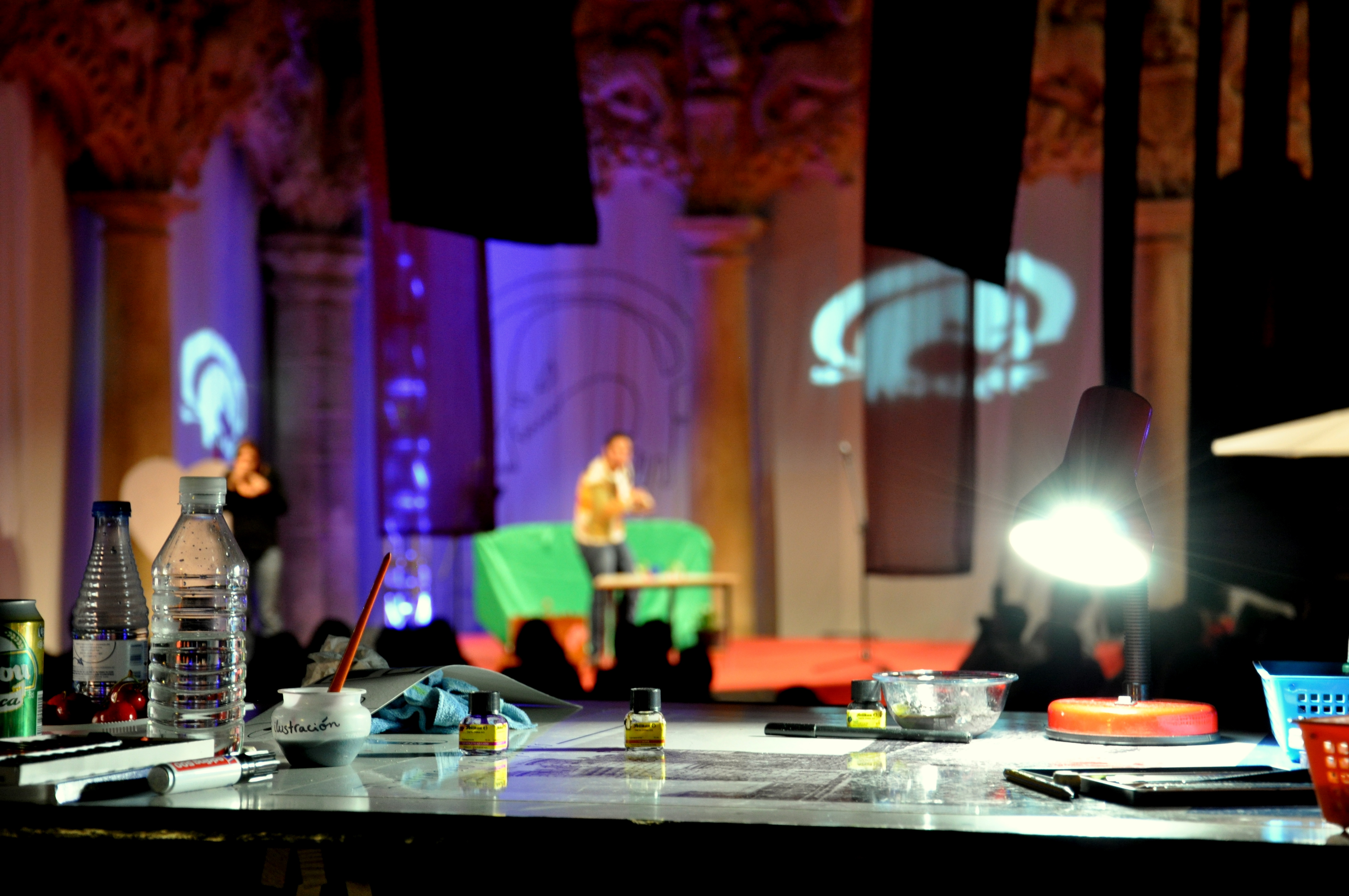
Illustrators stand in front of the storytellers in the Courtyard of the Lions of the palace of the Infantado to draw the narrations.

Different illustrators from around the world are responsible for putting on paper the stories that storytellers are narrating during the weekend. The illustrations are hung in one of the corners of the patio of the lions of the palace of the Infantado so that all can approach to see them.

The illustrators also participate creating the poster of the event each year, which will serve to promote the same serving as an image for posters, shirts and badges in each edition.

=== Photography marathon ===
The Photographic Group of Guadalajara makes this photographic follow-up creating an annual archive of the celebration and providing a souvenir to each participant of the Marathon.

=== Radio marathon ===
Radio retransmission of the stories through Radio Arrebato, both by radio frequency and online at www.radioarrebato.net.

=== Music marathon ===
Since 2002, and depending on the year, the music marathon is performed simultaneously in the gardens of the Infantado Palace.

=== Extra activities for the marathon ===
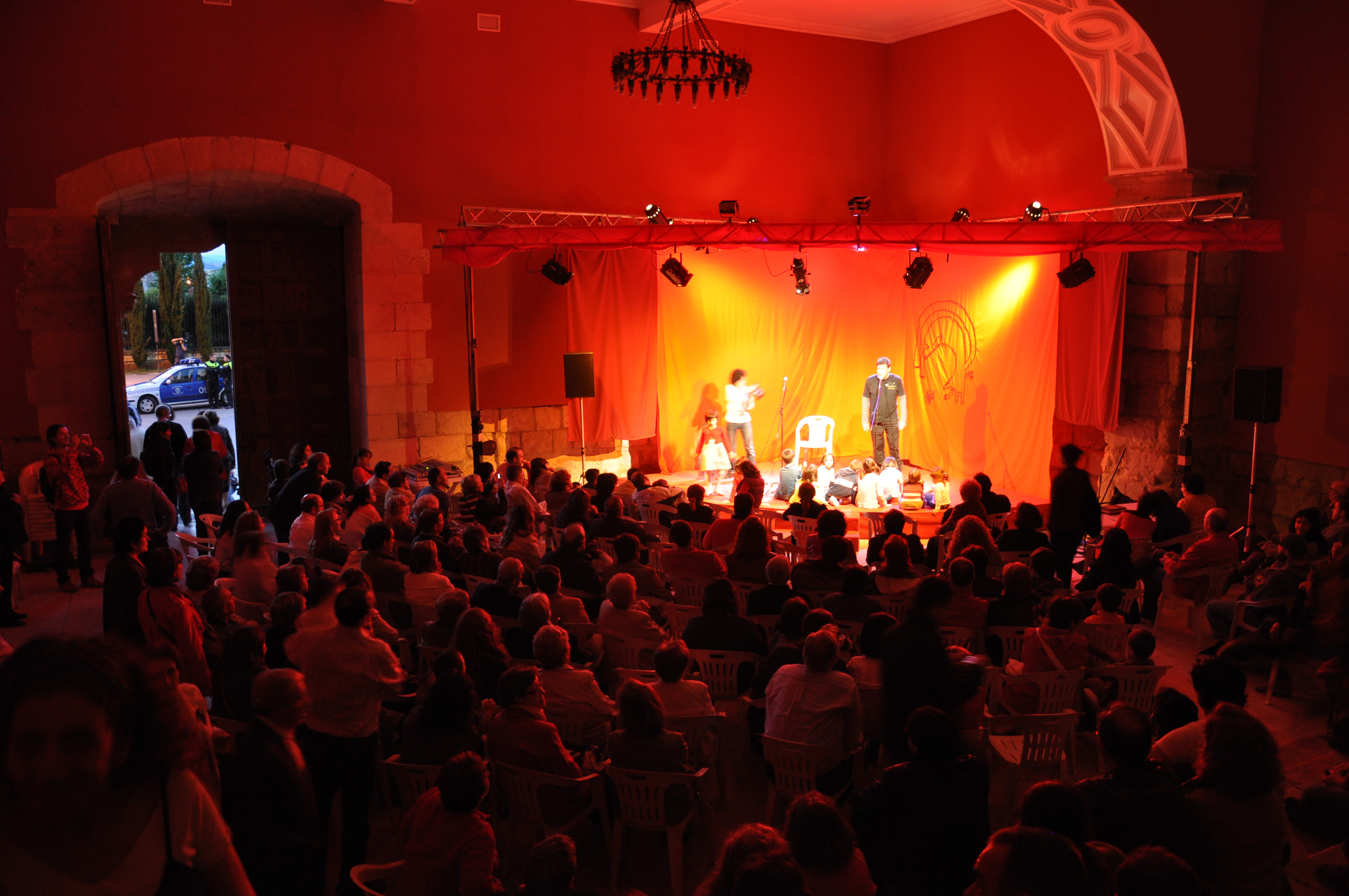
In the Zaguán Palace of the Infantado also tell stories, in case of rain hosts the main program, and is where the concert of the Banda de Guadalajara that closes the marathon is held.

- Translation of the narrations to sign language for deaf people since 2003 and transcription by screen of the stories narrated in languages other than Spanish.
- Different lectures on oral literature.
- Reading workshops.
- Photographic exhibitions of previous marathons.
- Exhibitions of the giant stories created by the schools of the province or in the different activities of the marathon.
- Chimenea de los Cuentos, place where the most timid can tell a story in a smaller environment.
- Various street shows, juggling, counters, mimes, etc.
- The Traveling Word is a program that moves the Marathon to places such as hospitals or nursing homes.
- Since 1999, the Traveler Marathon has traveled through different towns in the province of Guadalajara, performing in each of them a small Marathon of Tales.
- Festival of Professional Oral Narrative since 1997.
- The Bicicubeto travels by bicycle the streets of the city and at each stop a story is told.
- Monuments open at night, such as the Luis de Lucena chapel, the Antonio de Mendoza palace and the Cotilla palace.
- Night walks and guided tours of the city.
- Tourist train that runs through the city.
- Bookmarking workshop.
- Concert of the Provincial Band of Music at the end of the Marathon of the Tales of each year as a farewell, on Sunday between 12:00 and 15:00.
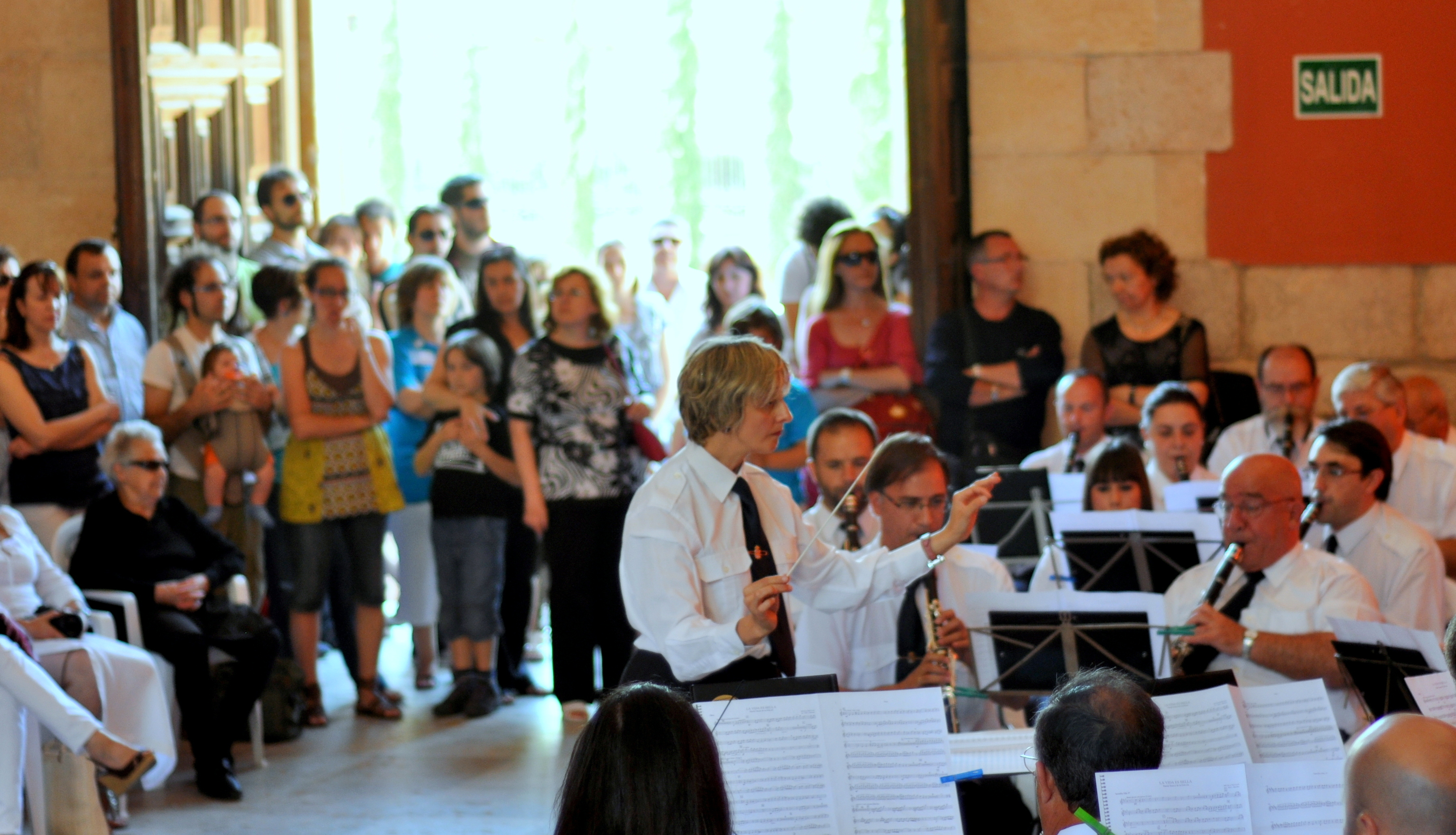
  Concert with which the Marathon of the Stories closes every year.

=== Viernes de los cuentos ===
The Friday of the stories is not included in the festival program, but it completes the story marathon by developing oral storytelling sessions for adults from October to May, including filandón on two of the Fridays during this period, reaching its 21st edition in 2017.

== Editions of the Maratón de los Cuentos of Guadalajara ==
Each year, the Maratón de los Cuentos assigns a theme that gives rise to a theme of the edition:

Year	Topic	num storytellers	num stories
2018	Las estrellas	.	.
2017	Oriente	1679	712
2016	La poesía anda por las calles	1500	850
2015	El Bosque	1364	765
2014	El Agua	1293	781
2013	De Cueva en Cueva	1382	878
2012	Misterios de Europa	1300	940
2011	Silencio, se cuenta	1207	785
2010	Los malos de los cuentos	981	713
2009	El sonido de la memoria	956	850
2008	África, continente de palabras	1054	729
2007	Ciudades de cuento	1084	798
2006	La luna	906	636
2005	Historias de ida y vuelta	1035	789
2004	Lenguas que cuentan	842	615
2003	Otro mundo es posible	1002	640
2002	La magia de la palabra	1039	621
2001	Maratón por Europa	976	573
2000	Maratón del tiempo	874	637
1999	La palabra y el silencio	880	640
1998	Los sueños	920	629
1997	La mar de cuentos	923	570
1996	Las mil y una noches	560	476
1995	El Mar-Ratón de los cuentos	871	367
1994	9º encuentro narradores	268	?
1993	8º encuentro narradores	?	240
1992	Feria del libro	211	212

== See also ==
- Storytelling
- Oral tradition
- Oral storytelling
- Filandón
