= A Town Has Turned to Dust =

A Town Has Turned to Dust may refer to:

- "A Town Has Turned to Dust" (Playhouse 90), a 1958 television play written by Rod Serling
- A Town Has Turned to Dust (1998 film), a 1998 television film
