= The Substitute 3: Winner Takes All =

- Promotional release poster
- Directed by: Robert Radler
- Written by: Roy Frumkes; Rocco Simonelli
- Based on: Characters by Roy Frumkes; Rocco Simonelli; Alan Ormsby
- Produced by: Terry Spazek
- Starring: Treat Williams; Rebecca Staab; Claudia Christian; James R. Black
- Cinematography: Barry M. Wilson
- Edited by: Florent Retz
- Music by: Tor Hyams
- Distributed by: Artisan Entertainment
- Release date: August 14, 1999
- Running time: 90 minutes
- Country: United States
- Language: English

The Substitute 3: Winner Takes All is a 1999 action thriller film directed by Robert Radler and starring Treat Williams as a mercenary who goes undercover as a teacher in order to expose a college football team's steroid-abuse scandal. A sequel to The Substitute 2: School's Out (1998). The film aired on HBO and was later released on DVD and in 2000 where it was bundled with the first film.

== Plot ==
Karl Thomasson (Treat Williams), a former mercenary, arrives on Long Island with a personal mission: to deliver a war medal to the daughter of a fallen comrade, Nicole Stewart, who now teaches English at a local college. Their relationship is tense—Nicole resents her father’s military absence—but Karl hopes the gesture will provide closure.

Shortly after his visit, Nicole has an initial confrontation with some of the college football players, who pressure her to pass them unfairly. Karl intervenes just in time to prevent the situation from escalating. Though Nicole manages to stand her ground, the students retaliate. On her way home, she is brutally attacked, leaving her shaken and hospitalized. Witnessing the dangers she faces, Karl decides to go undercover and poses as a substitute teacher at the university to investigate the perpetrators and protect Nicole.

As Karl assumes his role in the classroom, he begins to uncover a deeper conspiracy. The college football team is secretly using anabolic steroids, orchestrated by the head coach, Bill Braden. But the scheme goes beyond winning games: the steroid program is tied to a local crime syndicate led by Vincent “Vinnie the Brick” Lo Russo and his son Tony, who profit from the illegal steroid trade.

Karl enlists the help of his old mercenary allies, including Ed Lincoln, Rahmel, and Andy. Together, they gather evidence and surveillance on the players and their criminal connections. The investigation intensifies after a teammate dies from a steroid overdose, confirming the lethal stakes of the operation.

The tension escalates when Tony Lo Russo confronts Karl directly. In a violent showdown, Tony is killed, but the confrontation also results in the death of one of Karl’s team members, demonstrating how personal and dangerous the conflict has become. The mob retaliates, forcing Karl to act decisively.

Karl confronts Coach Braden and exposes the steroid and criminal operation. The climactic confrontation dismantles the syndicate, and justice is served: the criminal network is neutralized, the corrupt football program is exposed, and a news report later reveals that Coach Braden has committed suicide, highlighting the consequences of his actions.

In the aftermath, Karl’s mission is complete: he has protected Nicole, avenged wrongdoing, and dismantled a criminal enterprise, all while maintaining his role as a disciplined and methodical mercenary. The film ends with Karl walking away from the chaos, leaving the college and Nicole safe and the corrupt system exposed.

== Cast ==
- Treat Williams as Karl Thomasson
- Rebecca Staab as Professor Nicole Stewart
- Claudia Christian as Andrea 'Andy'
- James R. Black as Rahmel
- Frank Gerrish as Ed Lincoln
- David H. Stevens as Tony Lo Russo
- Richard Portnow as Vincent "The Brick" Lo Russo
- George Fisher as Sylvio
- Maxx Payne as "Muscle"
- Dane Stevens as Jerry Sundheim
- Richard Humphreys as Kirby
- David Jenson as Mason "Macy" Stewart
- Spencer Ashby as Professor Wayne McMurdo
- Barbara Jane Reams as Albanian Girl
- Brian Simpsons as Soldier #1
- Jeff Jenson as Soldier #2
- Erin Chambers as Terri
- Scott Wilkinson as Coach Bill Braden
- Michael Shane Davis as Josh Silver
- Ed Cameron as Bo Robinson
- Christian Jenson as Thad
- Danny Hansen as Jeremy Phillips
- Robert Harvey as Counterman

== Sequel ==
Three direct-to-DVD sequels were made, with Treat Williams replacing Tom Berenger:
