= Reams (surname) =

Reams is a surname. Notable people with the surname include:

- Barbara Jane Reams (born 1976), American actress
- Frazier Reams (1897–1971), American politician, congressman from Ohio
- Frazier Reams Jr. (1929–2020), American politician from Ohio, son of Frazier Reams
- Harry Reems (1947–2013), American real estate owner and former porn star
- Lee Roy Reams (born 1942), American actor, choreographer, and director
