= Treat Williams =

American actor (1951–2023)

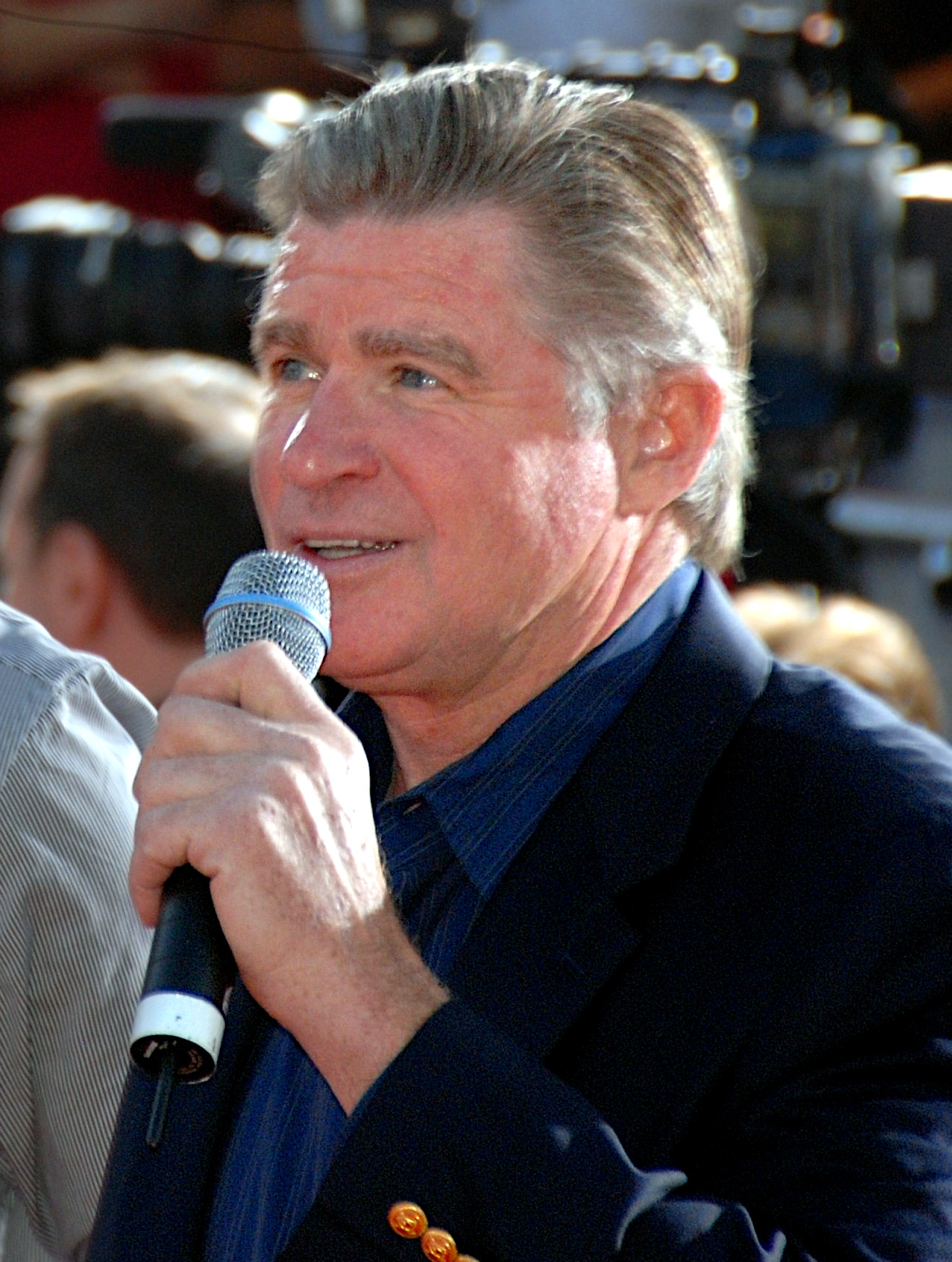
- Williams in 2008
- Born: Richard Treat Williams Jr; December 1, 1951; Stamford, Connecticut, U.S.
- Died: June 12, 2023 (aged 71); Albany, New York, U.S.
- Education: Franklin & Marshall College
- Occupations: Actor; author
- Years active: 1972–2023
- Spouse: Pam Van Sant (m. 1988)
- Children: 2

Richard Treat Williams Jr. (December 1, 1951 – June 12, 2023) was an American actor, whose career on stage and in film and television spanned five decades. He received many accolades for his work, including nominations for three Golden Globe Awards, two Primetime Emmy Awards, two Screen Actors Guild Awards, a Satellite Award, and an Independent Spirit Award.

Williams began his career on Broadway, portraying Danny Zuko in the original run of Grease (1972). After supporting roles in the films The Ritz and The Eagle Has Landed (both 1976), he rose to fame with starring roles in Miloš Forman's film version of the musical Hair and in Steven Spielberg's historical comedy 1941, both released in 1979. He received further acclaim for his performance in the Sidney Lumet crime drama Prince of the City (1981).

He appeared in many other films throughout his career, both in leading and supporting roles, including Once Upon a Time in America (1984), Flashpoint (1984), Smooth Talk (1985), The Men's Club (1986), Dead Heat (1988), The Phantom (1996), The Devil's Own (1997), Deep Rising (1998), the Substitute franchise (1998–2001), The Deep End of the Ocean (1999), Miss Congeniality 2 (2005), 127 Hours (2010) and Daily Wire’s Run Hide Fight (2020). Among his television roles, he starred as Dr. Andy Brown on the drama series Everwood (2002–2006), for which he received a Satellite Award nomination for Best Actor. Subsequent television work included White Collar (2012–2013), Chicago Fire (2013–2018), and Blue Bloods (2016–2023). He also starred as Mick O'Brien on the Hallmark series Chesapeake Shores (2016–2022) and as Bill Paley in the FX miniseries Feud: Capote vs. The Swans (2024), the latter being his final appearance on screen.

Throughout his career, Williams returned to the Broadway stage, appearing in productions of Over Here! (1974), Once in a Lifetime (1978), The Pirates of Penzance (1981), Love Letters (1989), and Follies (2001).

== Early life and education ==
Williams was born in Stamford, Connecticut, on December 1, 1951, the son of Marian (née Andrew), an antiques dealer, and Richard Norman Williams, a corporate executive. He moved with his family to Rowayton, Connecticut, when he was three. His maternal great-great-great-grandfather was William Henry Barnum, a U.S. senator from Connecticut and third cousin of the showman P. T. Barnum. Williams was a distant relative of both Robert Treat Paine—a signatory to the Declaration of Independence—and Herbert Hoover, the 31st President of the United States.

Williams played football in high school and college. He graduated from the Kent School in Connecticut and Franklin & Marshall College in Lancaster, Pennsylvania. As a teenager, he acted in high school and local theatre productions, and began to think seriously about an acting career during his first year of college: "I loved football very much, but I didn't think you could be a jock and be in the theatre company at the same time … I started to get serious about learning as much as possible about the craft of acting in my freshman year." At one point, he was performing in three college shows simultaneously: "a comedy, a Shakespeare and a musical".

== Career ==
=== 1972–1979: Stage work and film breakthrough ===
Williams launched his professional acting career in musical theatre; He starred as Utah in the Sherman Brothers' musical Over Here!. He then starred in Grease on Broadway in the lead role of Danny Zuko for three years, later saying of the experience, "I had grown up learning all of the songs from West Side Story, so I was aware of what a big deal 'Broadway' was. When I got my first little dressing room at the Royale Theatre, [I] thought, 'I've arrived. I'm here. This is fantastic!'".

In 1975, Williams made his feature film debut with a supporting role in the thriller Deadly Hero. He received positive notices the following year for his portrayal of Michael Brick—a squeaky-voiced private detective—in The Ritz, a farcical comedy based on the play of the same name, and next appeared in a small part in the British war film The Eagle Has Landed (1976). Williams came to worldwide attention in 1979 when he starred as George Berger—a leading member of a gang of flower children—in the Miloš Forman film Hair, based on the 1967 musical. Writing for the Sioux City Journal, critic Bob Thomas called it "a rare flight of creative imagination that widens the dimensions of the movie musical" and believed that Williams' performance "could not be better". In her mixed review for The New York Times, Janet Maslin wrote, "As his name might indicate, Treat Williams is one of the better things Hair has to offer … [he is] is the only one of the players who really suggests the spirit of euphoria upon which the original [stage production] meant to capitalize". Williams' performance earned him a nomination for the Golden Globe Award for New Star of the Year. His second film appearance of 1979 was the poorly reviewed Steven Spielberg war comedy 1941, in which he played Corporal Chuck Sitarski.

=== 1980s roles ===
Throughout the next decade, Williams appeared in a variety of supporting and leading film roles, such as the adventure drama The Pursuit of D. B. Cooper (1981), in which he played the titular aircraft hijacker; the Sergio Leone crime epic Once Upon A Time In America (1984); action-thriller Flashpoint (1984); Peter Medak's The Men's Club (1986); and the cult horror-comedy Dead Heat (1988). His portrayal of Daniel Ciello—in Sidney Lumet's 1981 neo-noir crime drama Prince of the City—brought Williams his second Golden Globe nomination and some of the strongest reviews of his career, with Roger Ebert saying of his "demanding and gruelling" performance, "Williams is almost always onscreen, and almost always in situations of extreme stress, fatigue, and emotional turmoil. We see him coming apart before our eyes". In a retrospective review of the film published by Empire in 2000, Simon Braud wrote:

It's doubtful whether a better performance was committed to celluloid in 1981 than Treat Williams' portrayal of the tortured Danny Ciello. In a staggering feat of acting prowess, Williams essays a fundamentally good, yet deeply flawed, human being disintegrating under intolerable pressure with rare courage and intensity.

Williams in 1983

Williams starred as Stanley Kowalski in the 1984 television adaptation of A Streetcar Named Desire, earning his third Golden Globe nomination, and was nominated for the 1985 Independent Spirit Award for Best Male Lead for his portrayal of Arnold Friend in that year's Smooth Talk. In her review of Talk for The Washington Post, Rita Kempley wrote, "The [film's] mood grows progressively darker as Treat Williams, playing a trashy dreamboat, drives up in his LeMans convertible … Matching Dern in her stunning performance, Williams is in his best role since Prince of the City".

=== 1990s–2006: Film, theatre, and Everwood ===
Between 1993 and 1994, Williams starred as cynical divorce attorney Jack Harold on the CBS sitcom Good Advice, which ran for two seasons and was unfavorably reviewed by critics, though some were complimentary of Williams' performance. His film credits throughout the mid-late 1990s included Things to Do in Denver When You're Dead (1995), Mulholland Falls (1996), The Devil's Own (1997), cult action-horror Deep Rising (1998), and The Deep End of the Ocean (1999). In 1996, he co-starred in the big-budget comic book adaptation The Phantom, with his character—villainous Xander Drax—trying his utmost to take over the world and kill the titular superhero. The film received mixed reviews, but many critics were impressed by the visuals and performances. Writing for the Chicago Sun-Times, Roger Ebert said he found the film "smashingly entertaining", adding, "Williams [is] implacably evil … and also slick and oily in the best pulp tradition". That same year, his "messianic" work in The Late Shift, an HBO television film in which he portrayed real-life talent agent Michael Ovitz, was roundly praised by critics and earned him an Emmy Award nomination for Outstanding Supporting Actor.

In 1998, Williams starred as Karl Thomasson, an ally of the previous film's protagonist, in the straight-to-video action film The Substitute 2: School's Out. He continued the role with The Substitute 3: Winner Takes All (1999) and The Substitute: Failure Is Not an Option (2001). He returned to the stage in 1999, earning critical acclaim for his work as Portuguese fisherman Manuel in the off-Broadway production of Captains Courageous, the Musical. Next, he appeared as Buddy in the Broadway revival of Stephen Sondheim's Follies (April–July 2001), and co-starred in the Woody Allen-directed satire Hollywood Ending (2002), with Elvis Mitchell of The New York Times calling his portrayal of film studio boss Hal Jaeger "frightening and impressive". His next major film role was that of egotistical FBI boss Walter Collins in the big-budget action comedy Miss Congeniality 2: Armed and Fabulous (2005).

Between 2002 and 2006, Williams played the lead role of Dr. Andrew Brown on the WB's Everwood, a drama series about a widowed neurosurgeon moving from New York City to Colorado with his two children. The show garnered critical acclaim and a devoted following during its four-season run, with Williams being nominated twice for the Screen Actors Guild Award for Outstanding Performance by a Male Actor (2003; 2004). He later said of his time on the show, "I was a big fan of all the Frank Capra movies [and] I thought Greg Berlanti wrote a Capra-esque show … It was just so full of love and good people and surprises and dealing with real life stuff that hadn't been dealt with on the networks before … I have extraordinarily warm feelings about it … I'm glad other people are discovering it because I think it's probably the best television series I was ever on". Between July and November 2006, he made several appearances on the first season of ABC's Brothers & Sisters, playing David Morton, a friend and potential suitor of protagonist Nora Walker.

=== 2007–2023: Final years ===
In 2007, Williams starred as Nathaniel Grant in the short-lived TNT series Heartland, which was cancelled during its first-season run, and played real-life convicted murderer Michael Peterson in the Lifetime movie The Staircase Murders. Variety's Laura Fries found his performance in the latter to be "effectively enigmatic". His film credits during this time included Pupi Avati's The Hideout (2007), romantic comedy What Happens in Vegas (2008), independent drama Howl (2010), and Danny Boyle's Oscar-nominated biographical drama 127 Hours (2010), in which he played the father of canyon climber Aron Ralston.

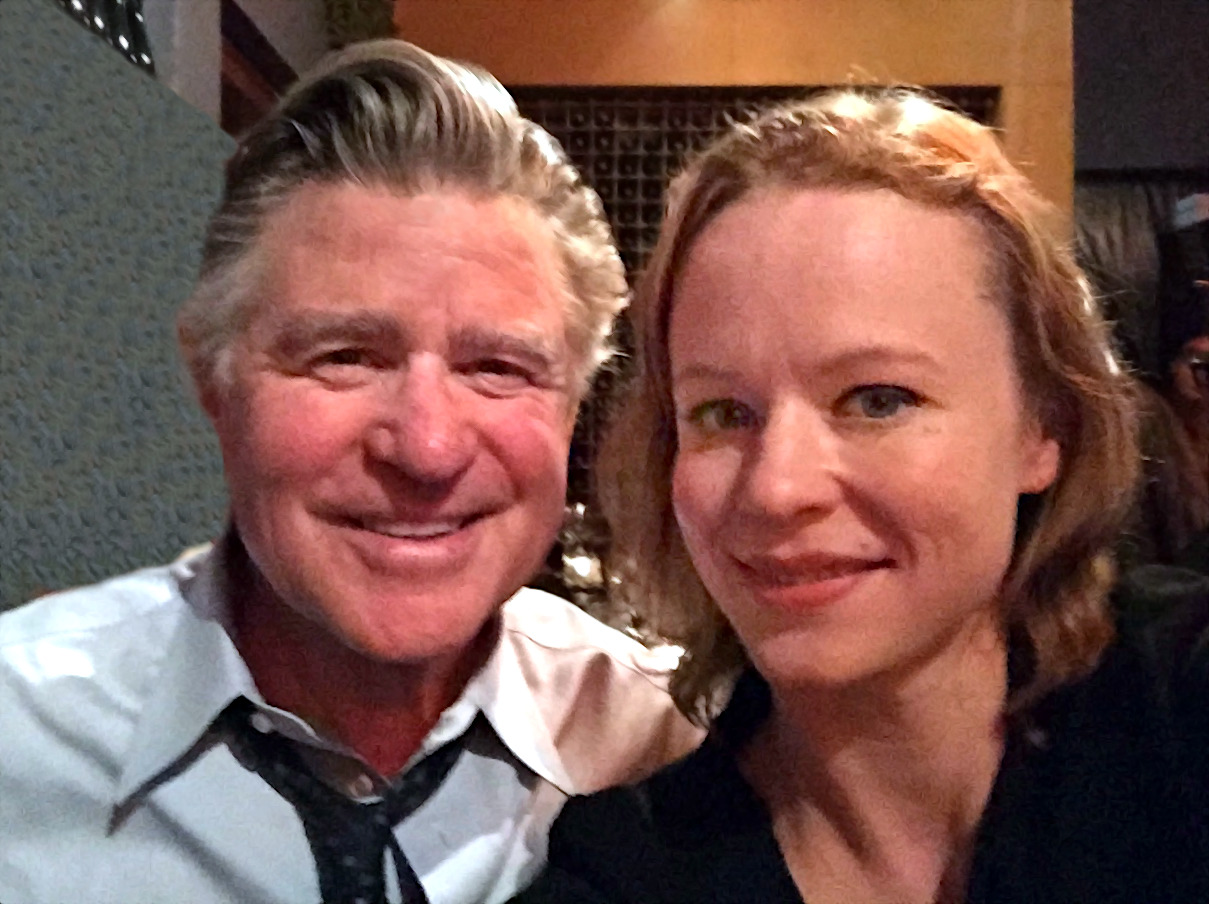
With Thora Birch on the set of The Etruscan Smile (2018)

In 2010, Williams authored the children's book Air Show!, which was published by Disney-Hyperion. Aimed at ages 6–9, it documents an air show with text and illustrations. Williams told Publishers Weekly that the idea for the book came about after attending an air show with his children and seeing the excitement it brought them, especially his daughter: "In the book, [the character] Ellie is the more knowledgeable of the two children, with a real desire to fly ... When I was a kid, books about airplanes were considered 'boy' books. I thought it would be wonderful to empower a little girl with this love of flight".

Williams went on to appear in numerous feature films between 2012 and 2021, including Deadfall (2012), Brazilian drama Reaching for the Moon (2013), Andrew Fleming's Barefoot (2014), romantic comedy Second Act (2018), Drunk Parents (2019), action thriller Run Hide Fight (2020), and the sports drama 12 Mighty Orphans (2021), in which he portrayed Amon G. Carter. Additionally, his performance in the 2018 drama The Etruscan Smile—an adaptation of José Luis Sampedro's novel—was met with praise, with Frank Scheck of The Hollywood Reporter believing that he brought "admirable gravitas" to his role as wealthy patriarch Frank Barron. He also appeared in various television films during this period, such as the acclaimed political thriller Confirmation (2016), playing U.S. senator Ted Kennedy; Hallmark's The Christmas House (2020), which drew attention for being the channel's first Christmas film to feature a same-sex couple; and the award-winning Netflix musical comedy Christmas on the Square (2020).

Williams played the principal role of Mick O'Brien on the Hallmark series Chesapeake Shores from 2016 until its final episode, which aired in October 2022. His other television appearances during the 2010s–2020s included recurring roles on White Collar (2012–2013) as Samuel Phelps; Chicago Fire (2013–2018) as Benny Severide; and Blue Bloods (2016–2023) as Lenny Ross, the former police partner of character Frank Reagan. At the time of his death in June 2023, Williams had completed filming the role of Bill Paley—co-founder of CBS—in Capote vs. The Swans, the second season of anthology series Feud. Created by Ryan Murphy for FX, the show premiered in January 2024 to positive reviews, with Vulture's Jackson McHenry noting, "Treat Williams, in his last filmed performance [is] both warm and brutally chauvinistic — by far the best work in the show". In July 2024, it was revealed that Williams had received a posthumous Emmy Award nomination for the role.

== Accolades ==
His portrayal of Dr. "Andy" Brown on The WB's Everwood (2002–2006) earned him two nominations for the Screen Actors Guild Award for Outstanding Performance in a Drama Series (2003, 2004). Over his career he earned additional nominations for Golden Globe, Primetime Emmy, and Independent Spirit Awards. Williams received a nomination for the Golden Globe Award for Best Actor in a TV Film for his portrayal of Stanley Kowalski in A Streetcar Named Desire (1984) and two nominations for the Emmy Award for Outstanding Supporting Actor for playing Michael Ovitz in The Late Shift (1996) and Bill Paley in Feud: Capote vs. The Swans (2024).

== Personal life ==
Williams lived in Park City, Utah, and Manchester Center, Vermont, with his wife, actress and producer Pam Van Sant (m. 1988), and their two children, Gill and Ellie.

In 1969, Williams' high school football coach, who was also a flight instructor, offered to train him in a Piper PA-18 Super Cub. At age 21, Williams became a private aircraft pilot. He later became an FAA instrument-rated commercial pilot with ratings in both single engine and multi-engine airplanes, as well as rotorcraft. He held a type rating for Cessna Citation jets. He was certified as a flight instructor. Williams owned a Piper J-3 Cub, Piper Cherokee 28-180, Piper Seneca II, and a Piper Navajo Chieftain, which was used for family travel between homes.

Williams learned to scuba dive in 1982 along with then-girlfriend Dana Delany while they spent time on Martha's Vineyard. They both became PADI certified divers.

=== Addiction problems ===
Williams was open about his struggles with drug addiction during the 1980s, which he believed hampered his career at a time when he was being called an "up-and-coming Pacino or De Niro". Speaking in 1995, he said: "[My film career] was stopped by my lack of focus and use of cocaine. I mean, I wanted to party more than I wanted to focus on my work … You don't realize, unfortunately, until later on how fleeting fame and power in Hollywood are … I screwed it up, and I think you have to be true about these things to move on. Otherwise you've always got that little skeleton". He added: "I think in a way your life goes where it needs to go, and maybe I needed [to] go through what I went through to grow up so I could be the actor that I'm really meant to be — the clear-headed guy that I want to be in my work and not somebody who's living life in the fast lane".

== Death ==
On June 12, 2023, Williams was involved in a motorcycle crash on Route 30, in Dorset, Vermont. According to the Vermont State Police, a car in the southbound lane turned into the path of Williams's motorcycle in the northbound lane, and Williams was unable to avoid colliding with it. He was airlifted to Albany Medical Center, where he was pronounced dead at the age of 71. The cause of death was "severe trauma and blood loss," according to medical examiner. Williams was wearing a helmet at the time of the accident.

On March 8, 2024, 35-year-old Ryan Koss, the driver of the car that hit Williams, pleaded guilty to one misdemeanor charge of negligent driving resulting in death, after initially being charged with a felony. Sentencing was deferred for a year, and Koss was required to undergo mental health counseling and a restorative justice program. Koss knew Williams and had called his wife after the crash. Williams's family said they did not want Koss to serve prison time.

== Tributes ==
In September 2023, Williams received a posthumous Lifetime Achievement Award at the Boston Film Festival during recognition of the film American Outlaws (2023), in which he appeared. On March 1, 2024, Blue Bloods dedicated its latest episode at that time, "Fear No Evil", to Williams. At the end of the fourth episode—"It's Impossible"—of Feud: Capote vs. The Swans (2024), a title card paid tribute to Williams' life.

On April 24, 2024, Williams' family announced a memorial event celebrating the life and work of Treat Williams at the Southern Vermont Arts Center (SVAC) in Manchester, Vermont on June 9.

On June 1, 2026, Vermont Highschool Burr and Burton Academy debuted the 'Treat Williams Scholarship,' commemorating seniors who excel in the performing arts. The first student to receive this award was Julian Cullinane.

== Acting credits ==
=== Film ===
Year	Title	Role	Notes
1975	Deadly Hero	Billings	
1976	The Ritz	Michael Brick	
1976	Marathon Man	Central Park Jogger	Uncredited
1976	The Eagle Has Landed	Captain Harry Clark	
1979	Hair	George Berger	
1979	1941	Corporal Chuck 'Stretch' Sitarski	
1980	The Empire Strikes Back	Echo Base trooper Jess Allashane	Uncredited
1980	Why Would I Lie?	Cletus	
1981	Prince of the City	Daniel Ciello	
1981	The Pursuit of D. B. Cooper	D. B. Cooper	
1983	Neapolitan Sting	Ferdinando	
1984	Once Upon a Time in America	James Conway O'Donnell	
1984	Flashpoint	Ernie Wyatt	
1985	Smooth Talk	Arnold Friend	
1986	The Men's Club	Terry	
1988	Sweet Lies	Peter	
1988	Night of the Sharks	David Ziegler	
1988	The Third Solution	Mark Hendrix	
1988	Dead Heat	Detective Roger Mortis	
1989	Heart of Dixie	Hoyt Cunningham	
1990	Beyond the Ocean	Christopher	
1993	Where the Rivers Flow North	Champ's Manager	
1994	Hand Gun	George McCallister	
1994	Texan	Man in Chinos	Short film; also director
1995	Things to Do in Denver When You're Dead	Bill 'Critical Bill'	
1996	Mulholland Falls	Colonel Nathan Fitzgerald	
1996	The Phantom	Xander Drax	
1997	The Devil's Own	Billy Burke	
1998	Deep Rising	John Finnegan	
1998	The Substitute 2: School's Out	Karl Thomasson	
1999	The Deep End of the Ocean	Pat Cappadora	
1999	The Substitute 3: Winner Takes All	Karl Thomasson	
2000	Critical Mass	Mike Jeffers	
2001	Crash Point Zero	Jason Ross	
2001	Skeletons in the Closet	Will	
2001	The Substitute: Failure Is Not an Option	Karl Thomasson	
2001	Venomous	Dr. David Henning	
2002	Gale Force	Sam Garrett	
2002	Hollywood Ending	Hal	
2002	The Circle	Spencer Runcie	
2005	Miss Congeniality 2: Armed and Fabulous	FBI Assistant Director Walter Collins	
2007	Moola	Luis Gordon	
2007	The Hideout	Father Amy	
2008	What Happens in Vegas	Jack Fuller Sr.	
2010	Maskerade	Mr. Tucker	
2010	Howl	Mark Schorer	
2010	127 Hours	Larry Ralston	
2010	Martino's Summer	Captain Jeff Clark	
2011	A Little Bit of Heaven	Jack Corbett	
2011	Oba: The Last Samurai	Colonel Wessinger	
2012	Attack of the 50 Foot Cheerleader	Dr. Grey	
2012	Deadfall	Sheriff Marshall T. Becker	
2013	In the Blood	Robert Grant	
2013	Reaching for the Moon	Robert Lowell	
2014	Barefoot	Mr. Wheeler	
2014	Operation Rogue	General Hank Wallace	
2016	The Congressman	Charlie Winship	
2018	The Etruscan Smile	Frank Barron	
2018	Second Act	Anderson Clarke	
2019	The Great Alaskan Race	Dr. Welch	
2019	Drunk Parents	Dan Henderson	
2020	Run Hide Fight	Sheriff Tarsy	
2020	Dolly Parton's Christmas on the Square	Carl	
2021	12 Mighty Orphans	Amon Carter	
2023	American Outlaws	Agent Jameison R. Donovan	

=== Television ===
Year	Title	Role	Notes
1983	Dempsey	Jack Dempsey	TV movie
1984	A Streetcar Named Desire	Stanley Kowalski	TV movie
1987	J. Edgar Hoover	J. Edgar Hoover	TV movie
1985	American Playhouse	Hudley T. Singleton III	Episode: "Some Men Need Help"
1987	Faerie Tale Theatre	Prince Andrew	Episode: "The Little Mermaid"
1987	Echoes in the Darkness	Rick Guida	2 episodes
1989	Third Degree Burn	Scott Weston	TV movie
1990	Drug Wars: The Camarena Story	Ray Carson	3 episodes
1990	Max and Helen	Max Rosenberg	TV movie
1991	Final Verdict	Earl Rogers	TV movie
1991	Eddie Dodd	Eddie Dodd	Main role
1992	Tales from the Crypt	Howard Prince	Episode: "None But the Lonely Heart"
1992	Batman: The Animated Series	Dr. Achilles Milo	Voice, 2 episodes
1992	Till Death Us Do Part	Alan Palliko	TV movie
1992	The Water Engine	Dave Murray	TV movie
1992	Deadly Matrimony	Alan Masters	TV movie
1993	Bonds of Love	Robby Smith	TV movie
1993	Road to Avonlea	Zak Morgan	Episode: "Moving On"
1993–1994	Good Advice	Jack Harold	Main role
1994	Parallel Lives	Peter Barnum	TV movie
1995	In the Shadow of Evil	Jack Brenner	TV movie
1995	Johnny's Girl	Johnny	TV movie
1996	The Late Shift	Michael Ovitz	TV movie
1998	Escape: Human Cargo	John McDonald	TV movie
1998	Every Mother's Worst Fear	Mitch Carson	TV movie
1999	36 Hours to Die	Noah Stone	TV movie
1999	Journey to the Center of the Earth	Theodore Lytton	2 episodes
2000	Hopewell	David Jonas	TV movie
2002	Guilty Hearts	Stephen Carrow	TV movie
2002	UC: Undercover	Teddy Collins	Episode: "Teddy C"
2002	Going to California	Officer Terrence 'Terry' Miller	Episode: "The West Texas Round-up and Other Assorted Misdemeanors"
2002–2006	Everwood	Dr. Andrew 'Andy' Brown	Main role
2006	Brothers & Sisters	David Morton	4 episodes
2007	Heartland	Dr. Nathaniel "Nate" Grant	Main role
2007	The Staircase Murders	Michael Peterson	TV movie
2008	Good Behavior	Burt Valencia	TV movie
2008	Front of the Class	Norman Cohen	TV movie
2009	Safe Harbor	Doug	TV movie
2009	Chasing a Dream	Gary Stiles	TV movie
2009	The Storm	Robert Terrell	2 episodes
2010	Boston's Finest	Jack Holt	TV movie
2011	Beyond the Blackboard	Dr. Warren	TV movie
2011	Against the Wall	Don Kowalski	Main role
2011	Law & Order: Special Victims Unit	Jake Stanton	Episode: "Spiraling Down"
2012	Leverage	Pete Rising	Episode: "The Blue Line Job"
2012	The Simpsons	Himself/William Sullivan	Voice, episode: "A Totally Fun Thing That Bart Will Never Do Again"
2012–2013	White Collar	Samuel Phelps/James Bennett	Recurring role
2013–2018	Chicago Fire	Benny Severide	Recurring role
2013	Eve of Destruction	Max Salinger	2 episodes
2013	Hawaii Five-0	Mick Logan	2 episodes
2013	Age of Dinosaurs	Gabe	TV movie
2014	CSI: Crime Scene Investigation	Sam	Episode: "Dead in His Tracks"
2015	American Odyssey	Col. Stephen Glen	Main role
2016–2022	Chesapeake Shores	Mick O'Brien	Main role
2016–2023	Blue Bloods	Lenny Ross	Recurring role
2016	Confirmation	Ted Kennedy	TV movie
2017	Rocky Mountain Christmas	Roy	TV movie
2020	The Christmas House	Bill	TV movie
2021	The Christmas House 2: Deck Those Halls	Bill	TV movie
2022	We Own This City	Brian Grabler	2 episodes
2024	Feud: Capote vs. The Swans	William S. Paley	Limited series; final role

=== Theatre ===
Year	Title	Role	Venue	Refs.
1974–1975	Over Here!	Utah	Shubert Theatre, Broadway	
1976–1977	Grease	Danny Zuko (Replacement)	Royale Theatre, Broadway	
1978	Once in a Lifetime	Jerry Hyland	Circle in the Square Theatre, Broadway	
1981–1982	The Pirates of Penzance	The Pirate King (Replacement)	Minskoff Theatre, Broadway	
1982	Some Men Need Help	Hudley T. Singleton III	47th Street Theatre, Off-Broadway	
1989	Bobby Gould in Hell	Bobby Gould	Mitzi E. Newhouse Theater	
1989–1990	Love Letters	Andrew Makepiece Ladd III (Replacement)	Promenade Theatre, Broadway	
1991	Speed-the-Plow	Bobby Gould	Williamstown Theatre Festival	
1992–1994	Oleanna	John	Orpheum Theatre, Los Angeles	
1999	Captains Courageous, the Musical	Manuel	Manhattan Theatre Club	
2001	Follies	Buddy Plummer	Belasco Theatre, Broadway	

== Awards and nominations ==
Year	Association	Category	Project	Result	Ref.
1979	Golden Globe Awards	New Star of the Year - Actor	Hair	Nominated	
1981	Golden Globe Awards	Best Actor in a Motion Picture – Drama	Prince of the City	Nominated	
1984	Golden Globe Awards	Best Actor - Miniseries or Television Film	A Streetcar Named Desire	Nominated	
1985	Independent Spirit Awards	Best Male Lead	Smooth Talk	Nominated	
1985	Chicago International Film Festival Award	Best Short	Texan	Won	
1996	Primetime Emmy Awards	Outstanding Supporting Actor in a Miniseries or Movie	The Late Shift	Nominated	
1996	Satellite Awards	Best Supporting Actor in a Limited Series or Television Movie	The Late Shift	Nominated	
2003	Screen Actors Guild Awards	Outstanding Actor in a Drama Series	Everwood	Nominated	
2004	Screen Actors Guild Awards	Outstanding Actor in a Drama Series	Everwood	Nominated	
2005	Satellite Awards	Best Actor - Television Series Drama	Everwood	Nominated	
2005	Teen Choice Awards	Choice TV Parental Unit	Everwood	Nominated	
2023	Boston Film Festival	Lifetime Achievement Award	American Outlaws	Won	
2024	Primetime Emmy Awards	Outstanding Supporting Actor in a Limited or Anthology Series or Movie	Feud: Capote vs. The Swans	Nominated	
2025	Critics' Choice Television Awards	Best Supporting Actor in a Movie/Miniseries	Feud: Capote vs. The Swans	Nominated	
