= Royal Order of Sports Merit =

Spanish civil order of merit

Royal Order of Sports Merit Real Orden del Mérito Deportivo
- Badge of the Royal Order of Sports Merit.

Awarded by His Majesty The King of Spain
- Type: Order of Merit
- Awarded for: Recognition of activities in the fields of sport and physical education.
- Chancellor: Minister of Education, Culture and Sport

Precedence
- Next (higher): Orden de las Artes y las Letras de España
- Next (lower): Orden al Mérito del Plan Nacional sobre Drogas
- Ribbon of the Order

The Royal Order of Sports Merit (Spanish: Real Orden del Mérito Deportivo) is a Spanish civil order of merit established on 18 June 1982. The order is intended to recognise distinguished service in sports, in teaching physical education, or the management, organisation, promotion and development of physical education and sports. The order may be presented to individuals in one of four classes. It may also be presented to legal personalities, organizations, and other entities in one of three classes.

The Spanish Constitution of 1978 contains in article 43.3, a guiding principle in the conduct of public authorities to promote physical education and sport. The Royal Order of Sports Merit is a tool of this constitutional mandate to promote, advertise, and propagate physical culture and sports.

== Classes of the order ==
Individuals may be awarded the Royal Order of Sports Merit in one of four classes:

- Grand Cross, awarded by Royal Decree in accordance with the Council of Ministers.
- Gold Medal, awarded by the Minister of Education, Culture and Sport, on the proposal of the President of the Sports Council.
- Silver Medal, awarded by the President of the Sports Council.
- Bronze Medal, awarded by the President of the Sports Council.

Groups and organizations may be awarded in one of three different classes:

- Gold Plaque, awarded by Royal Decree in accordance with the Council of Ministers.
- Silver Plaque, awarded by the President of the Sports Council.
- Bronze Plaque, awarded by the President of the Sports Council.
