= La sonrisa etrusca =

José Luis Sampedro

The Etruscan Smile
- Author: José Luis Sampedro
- Original title: La sonrisa etrusca
- Language: Spanish
- Publication date: 1985
- Publication place: Spain

La sonrisa etrusca ("The Etruscan Smile") is a bestselling novel written by the Spanish economist and author José Luis Sampedro in 1985. Originally, it was written in Spanish. The story was inspired by the birth of the author's grandson.

== Plot outline ==
A tough old farmer from southern Italy takes pride in his time served as a partisan during World War II. Due to a serious medical condition, he must move in with his son and daughter-in-law in Milan. While disliking life in the northern city, the relations between the old man and his tender grandson evolve, transforming his life during his final days.

== Adaptations ==
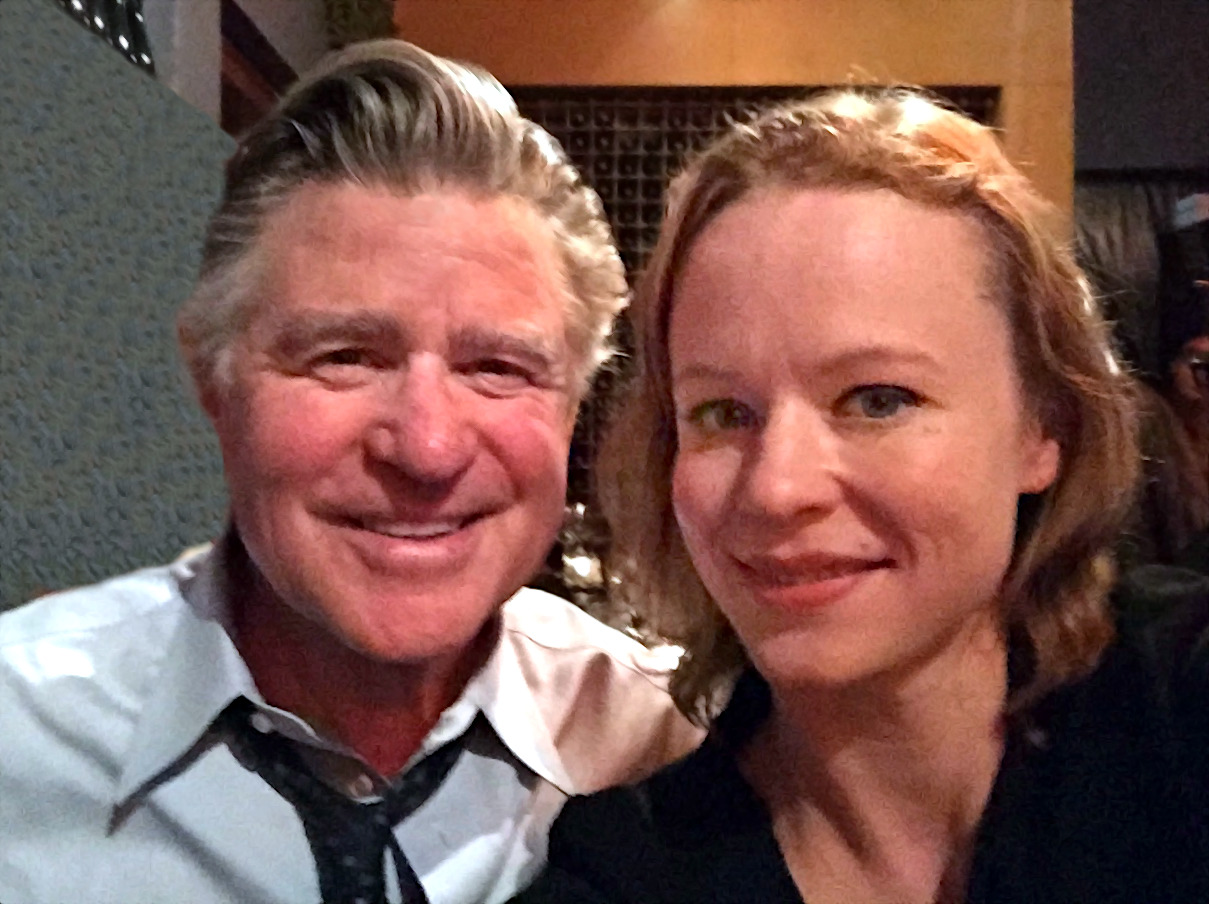
Thora Birch and Treat Williams on the set of The Etruscan Smile

- The Etruscan Smile (2018), film directed by Oded Binnun and Mihal Brezis
  A film adaptation was released in 2018. It was produced by multiple Academy Award winner Arthur Cohn and directed by Oscar nominated filmmakers Oded Binnun and Mihal Brezis. It stars Brian Cox, Thora Birch, JJ Feild, Treat Williams, Rosanna Arquette and Peter Coyote. The film's score is composed by Frank Ilfman, and it is performed by the London Metropolitan Orchestra and orchestrated and conducted by Matthew Slater.
  Several changes to the novel were made for the screenplay. Written by Michael McGowan, Michal Lali Kagan and Sarah Bellwood, the adaptation has changes such as the nationalities of the main character (Scottish) and his grandson (American) as well as the location where the old man moves (San Francisco). In the UK the film was released under the title Rory's Way.
