= Museum of Guadalajara =

- Museo de Guadalajara
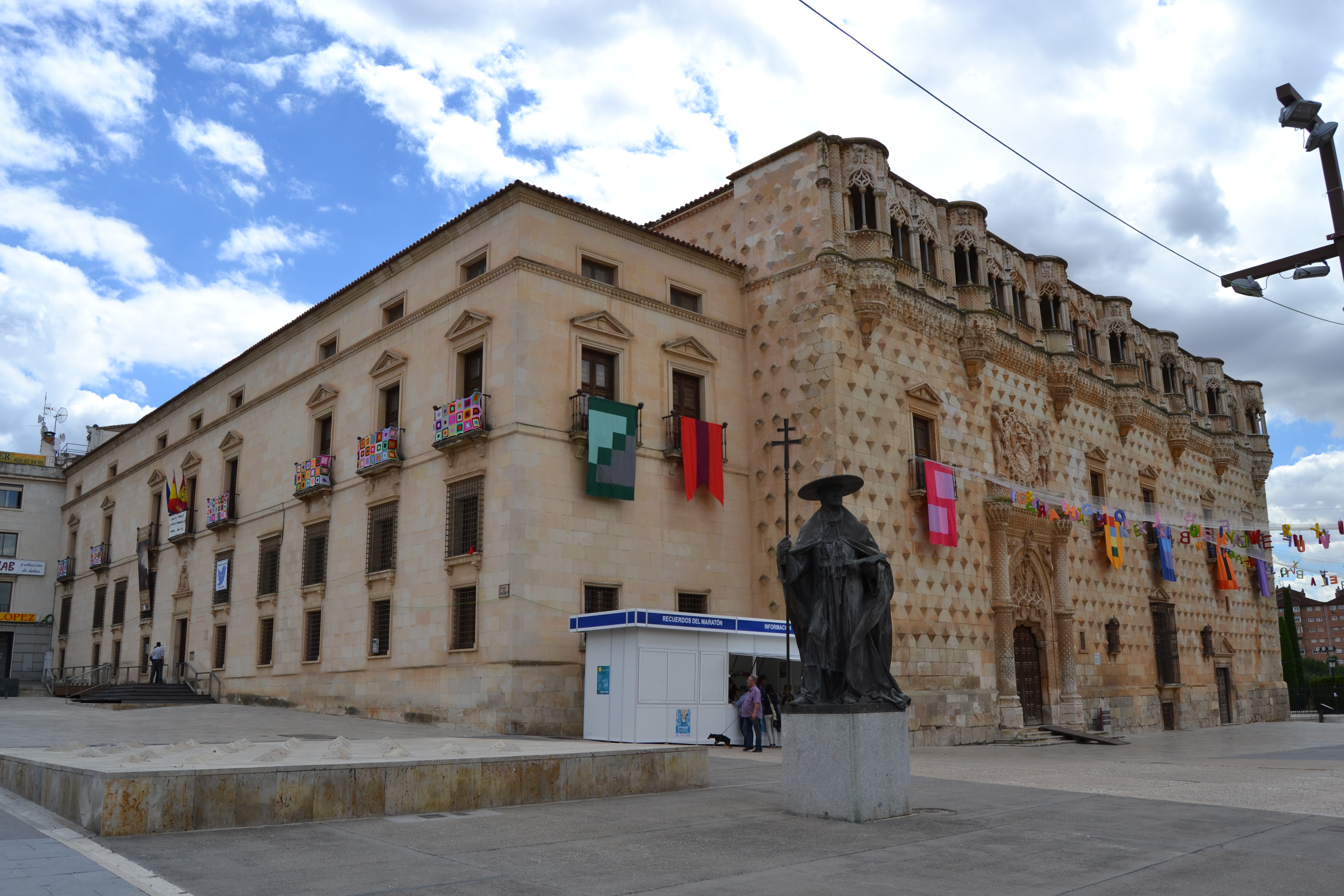
- Museum's facade
- Established: 1838
- Location: Palacio del Infantado, Guadalajara, Spain
- Coordinates: 40°38′13″N 3°10′03″W
- Type: Archaeological museum, fine art museum, ethnographic museum
- Owner: General State Administration

The Museum of Guadalajara (Spanish: Museo de Guadalajara, also Museo Provincial de Guadalajara) is a State-owned museum in Guadalajara, Spain. Opened in 1838, it is the oldest provincial museum in the country. It features sections of Fine Arts, Archaeology and Ethnography. It is hosted at the Palacio del Infantado since 1973.

== History ==
Created by means of a May 1837 Royal Order, the provincial museum was opened on 19 November 1838. It was originally hosted at the Convent of La Piedad. It moved to different premises, including the Palace of El Infantado, the former convent of La Concepción, back to La Piedad and the Palace of the Provincial Deputation. Following decades of discontinued existence, it was opened again at the Palacio del Infantado on 11 July 1973.

Its management (not the ownership, retained by the Spanish State) was transferred to the Regional Government of Castile-La Mancha by means of a 1984 agreement.

== Collection ==
The museum displays items from the province of Guadalajara distributed in sections of Fine Arts, Archaeology and Ethnography.

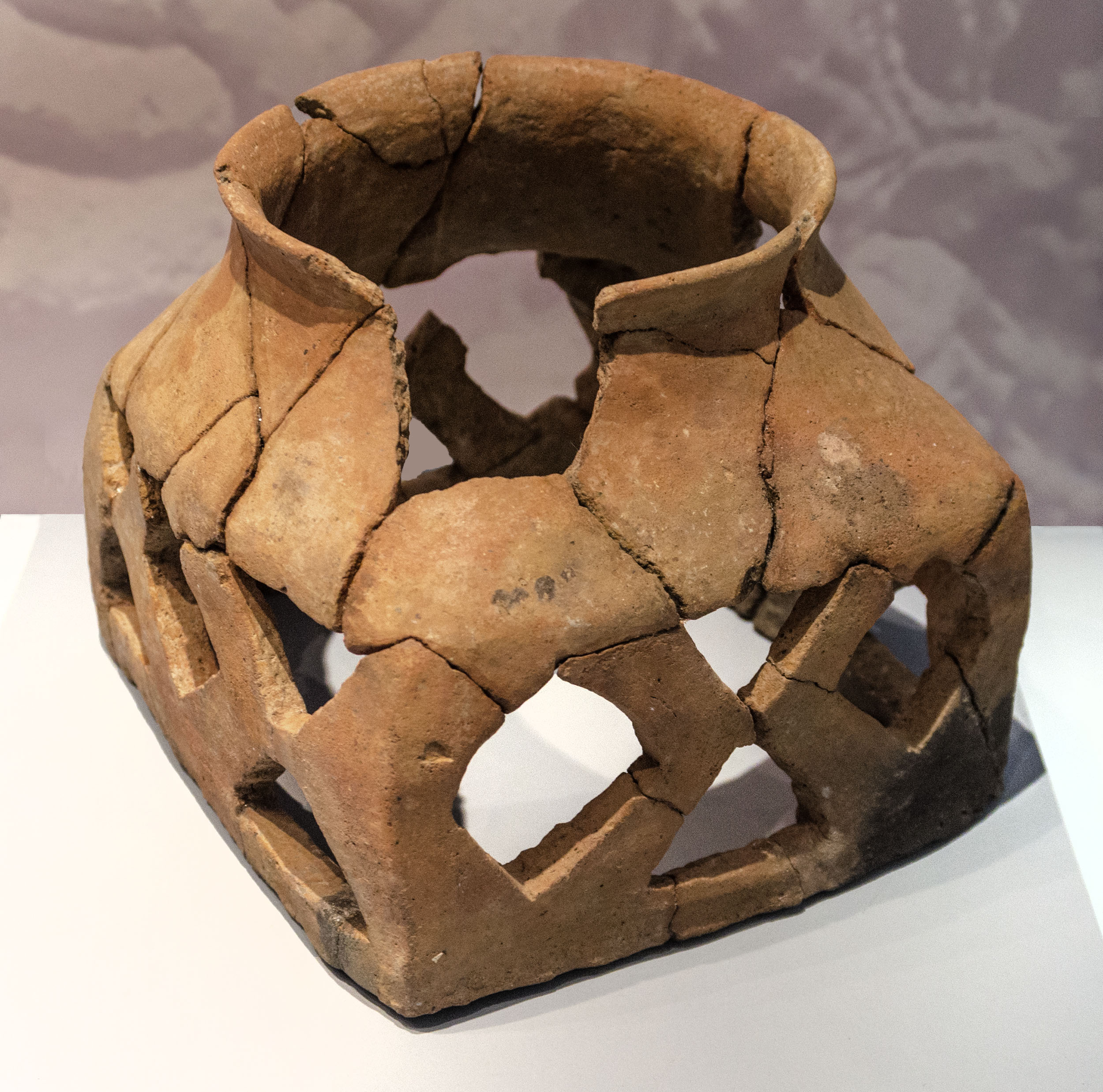
Clay brazier from Herrería (6th century BCE)

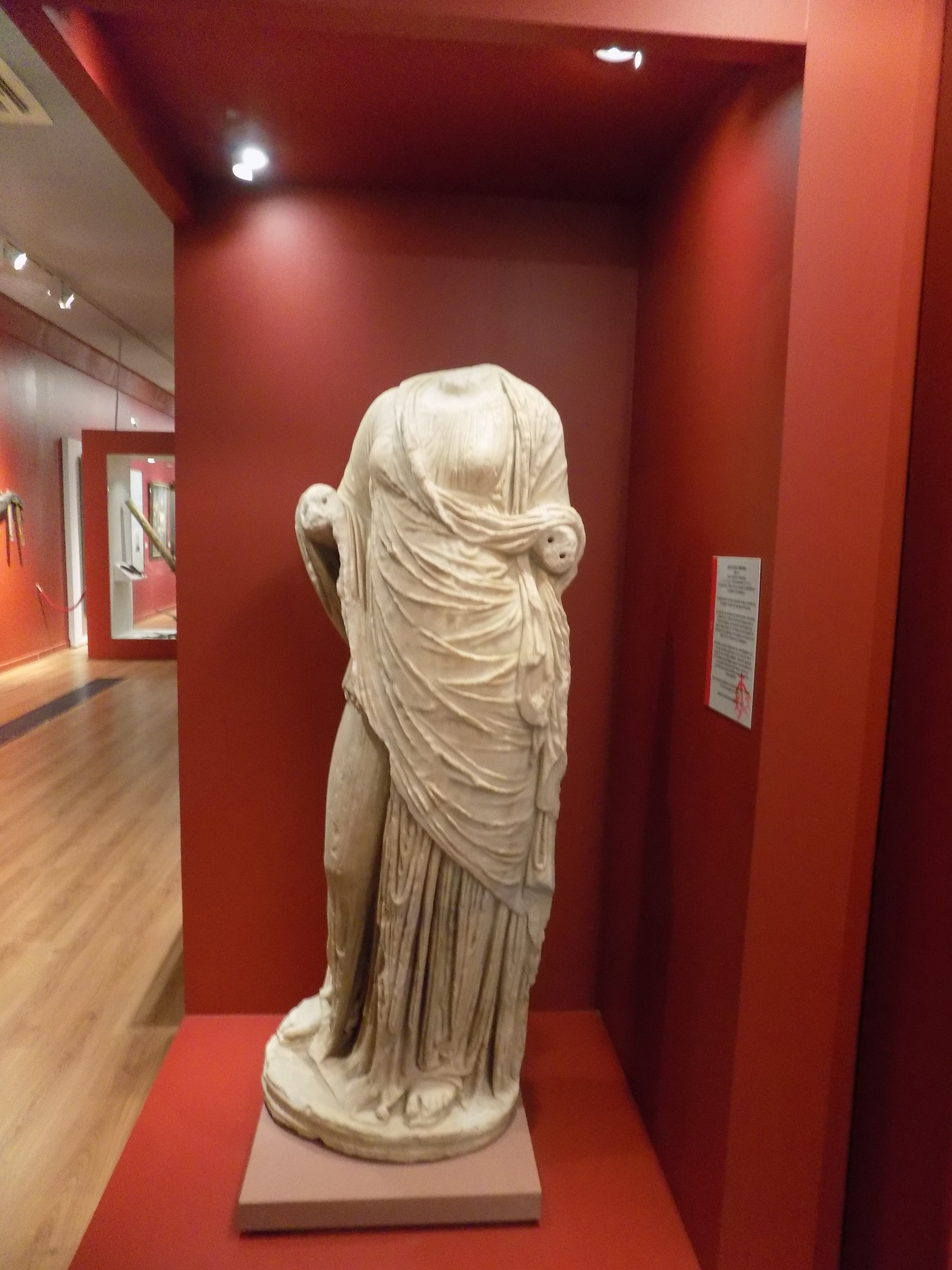
Female Roman-era statue from the Palace of the Dukes of Medinaceli in Cogolludo (2nd century)

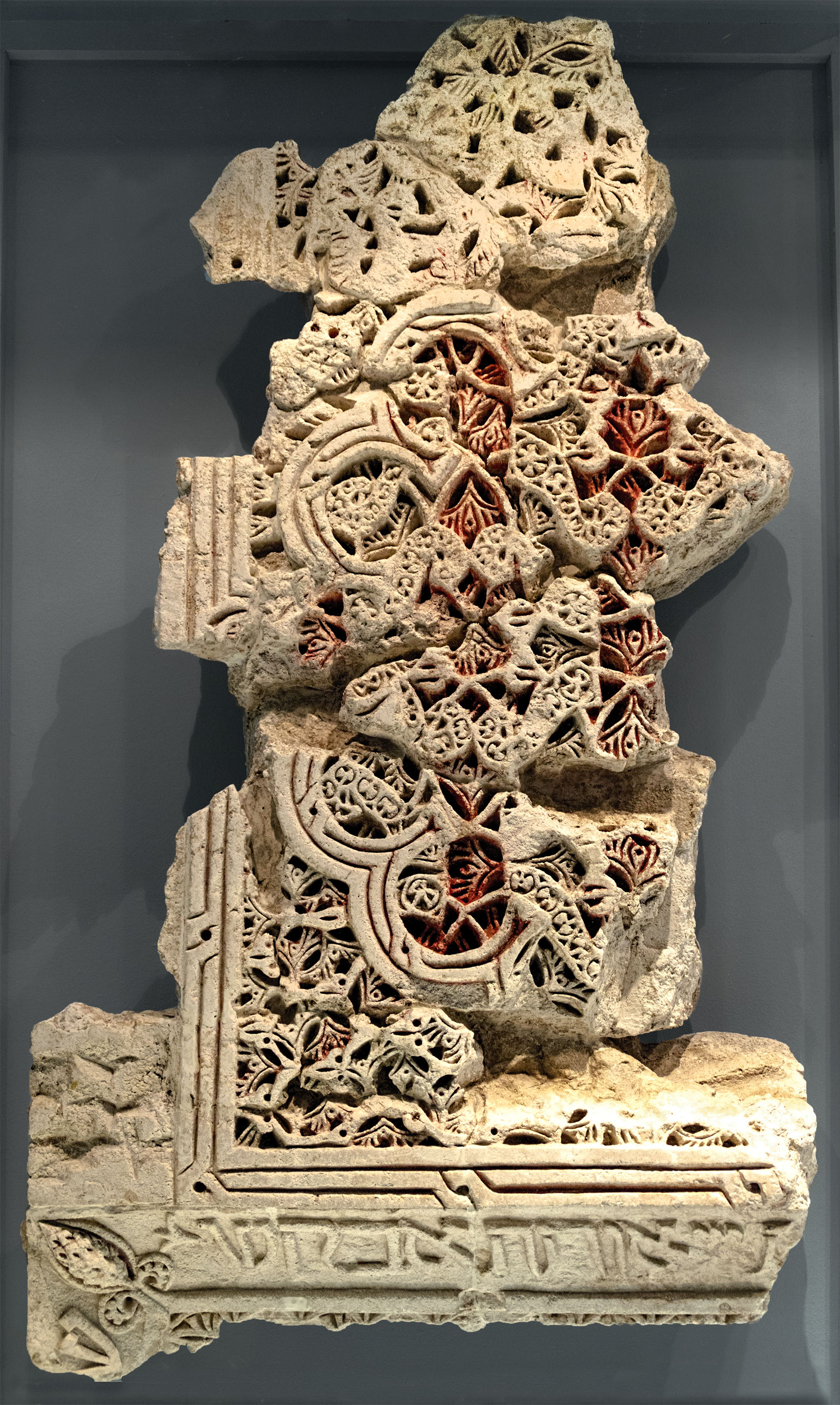
Plasterwork with Hebrew inscriptions, from Molina de Aragón (14th century)

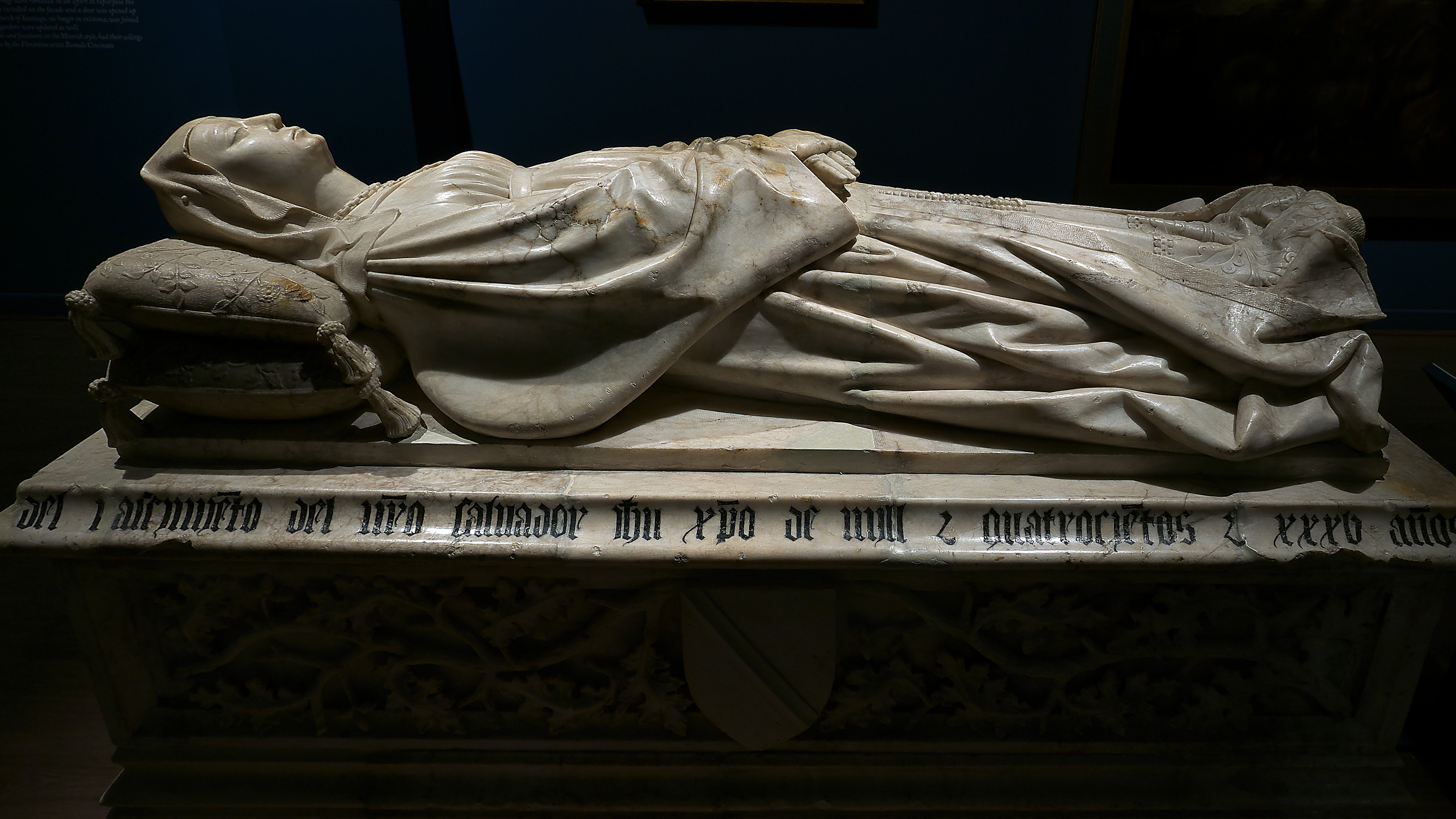
Sepulcro de doña Aldonza de Mendoza, from the monastery of Lupiana (15th century)

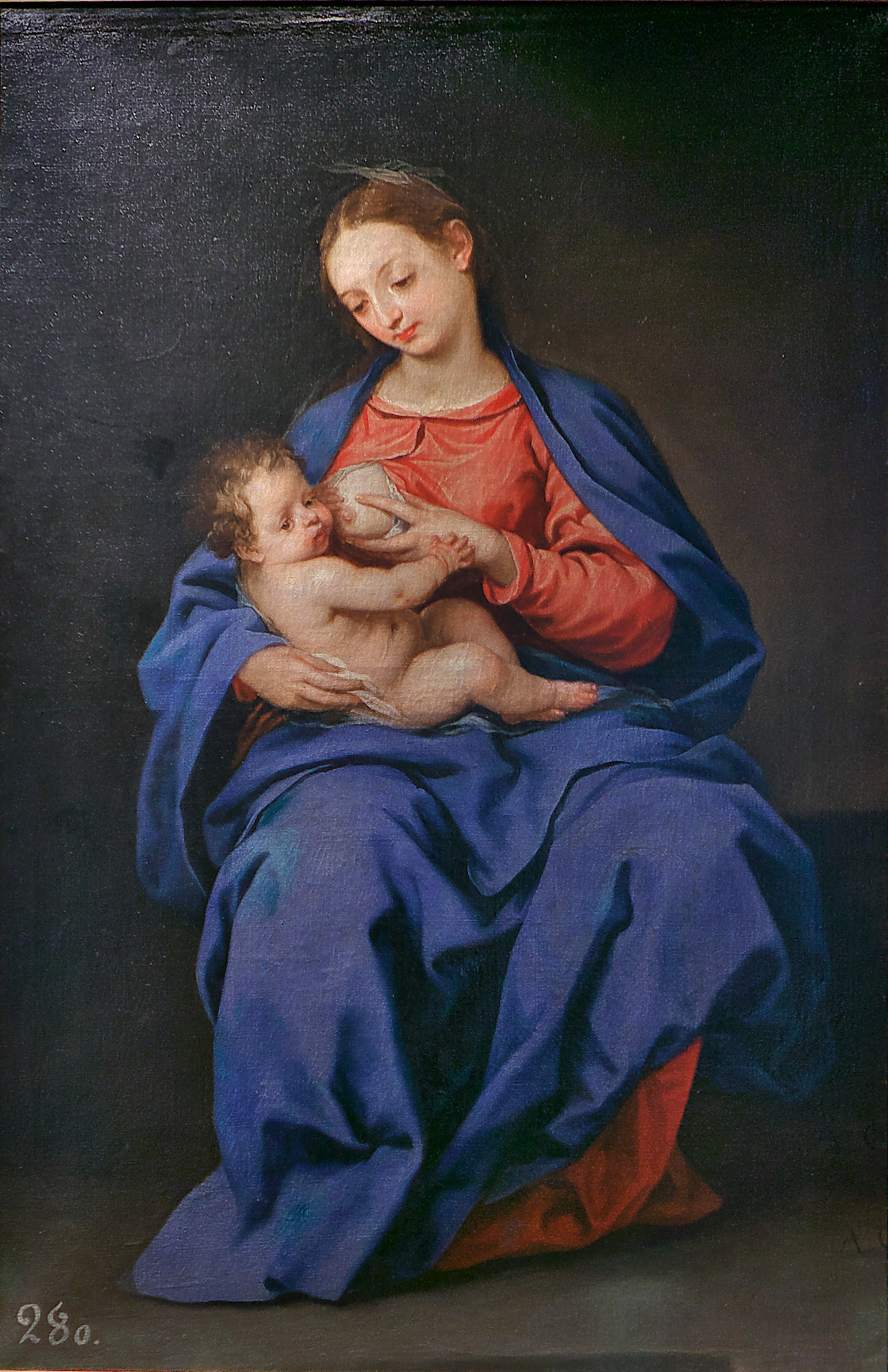
La Virgen de la leche, by Alonso Cano (17th century)

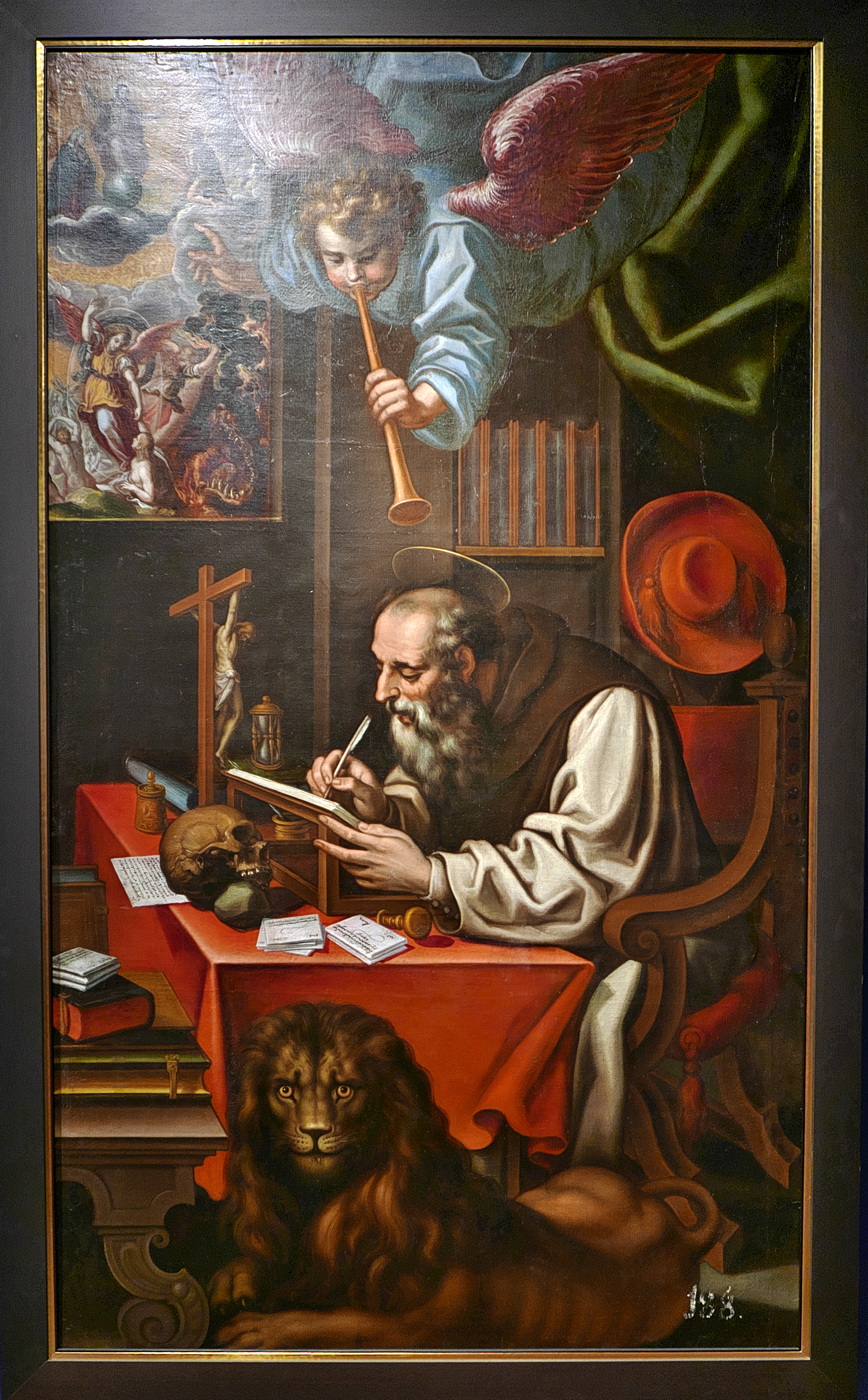
San Jerónimo pintando, attributed to Romulo Cincinato, from the Monastery of San Bartolomé
