= Àngels Martínez Castells =

Spanish economist and politician (1948–2024)

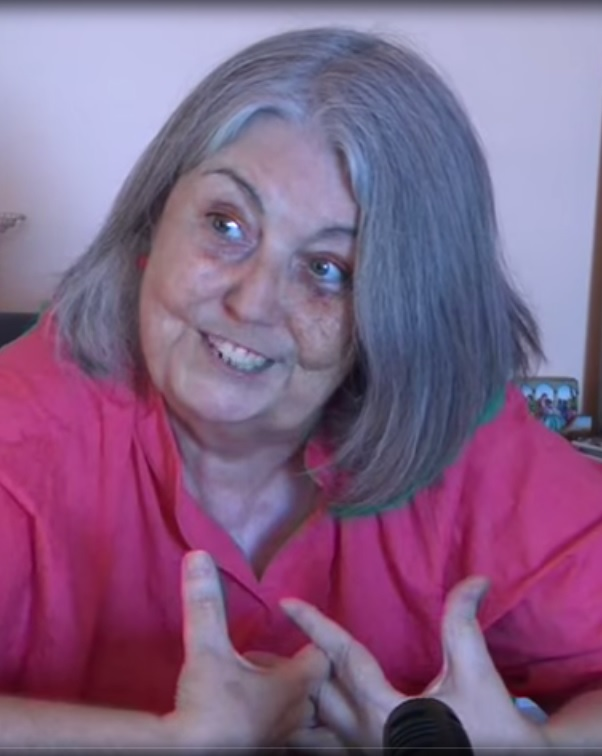
- Martínez Castells in 2011

Member of the Parliament of Catalonia
- In office 26 October 2015 – 28 October 2017
- Parliamentary group: Catalunya Sí que es Pot
- Constituency: Barcelona

Personal details
- Born: 9 May 1948 Mollet del Vallès, Spain
- Died: 1 September 2024 (aged 76)
- Occupation: Economist; Politician

Àngels Martínez i Castells (9 May 1948 – 1 September 2024) was a Spanish economist and politician in Catalonia. From 2015 to 2017 she represented Barcelona in the Parliament of Catalonia.

== Life and career ==
Martínez Castells was born in Mollet del Vallès. She attended the University of Barcelona, where she graduated with a doctorate in economics, having previously also studied commerce, philosophy, literature, and law. Her thesis was directed by Fabián Estapé, in which she studied governance in Portugal following the Carnation Revolution.

After her PhD, Martínez Castells became a professor of economic policy in the Faculty of Economic and Business Sciences at the University of Barcelona. In 1999 she became the first woman candidate of EUiA in the elections to the European Parliament representing the PCC in the IU-EUiA candidacy and in 2004 she was second in the ICV-EUiA candidacy led by Raul Romeva but was not elected.

In 2000, Martínez Castells was the Vice President of the Pere Ardiaca Foundation.

Martínez Castells was a founding member of the United and Alternative Left, a Catalonian political party. She served for years as a member of the National Council of that party.

Martínez Castells ran for European Parliament for the United and Alternative Left in 1999, and in 2004 she was again on the United and Alternative Left ticket, but she was not elected.

In 2009, Martínez Castells co-founded, and then chaired, the public health platform Dempeus per la Salut Pública. In 2013, she was elected to the Scientific Council of the Association for the Taxation of Financial Transactions and for Citizens' Action.

In May 2015, Martínez Castells was ranked in the 32nd place on the party list of the Barcelona en Comú in the municipal elections. In July 2015, she was elected in a primary election to hold the second position on the list of Podemos for the Catalonian parliamentary elections. After the coalition Catalunya Sí que es Pot was formed, she was also highly placed on the resultant party list, and she was elected to the Parliament of Catalonia where she served until 2017.

Martínez Castells died on 1 September 2024, at the age of 76.

=== Controversy ===
In the session of 7 September 2017 in which the Parliament was voting on the Law of juridical transition and foundation of the Republic, the deputies of Citizens and the People's Party of Catalonia left their seats in protest against the discussion, which, according to these parties, implied a violation of the Spanish Constitution and the Statute of Autonomy, and left Spanish and Catalan flags on their seats. Martínez Castells got up from her seat and removed the Spanish flags, leaving the Catalan flags. This controversial gesture, which was reprimanded by the president of the chamber, Carme Forcadell, was reported in the press.
