= Order of Merit for Agriculture, Fisheries and Food =

Order of Merit for Agriculture, Fisheries and Food Orden del Mérito Agrario, Pesquero y Alimentario
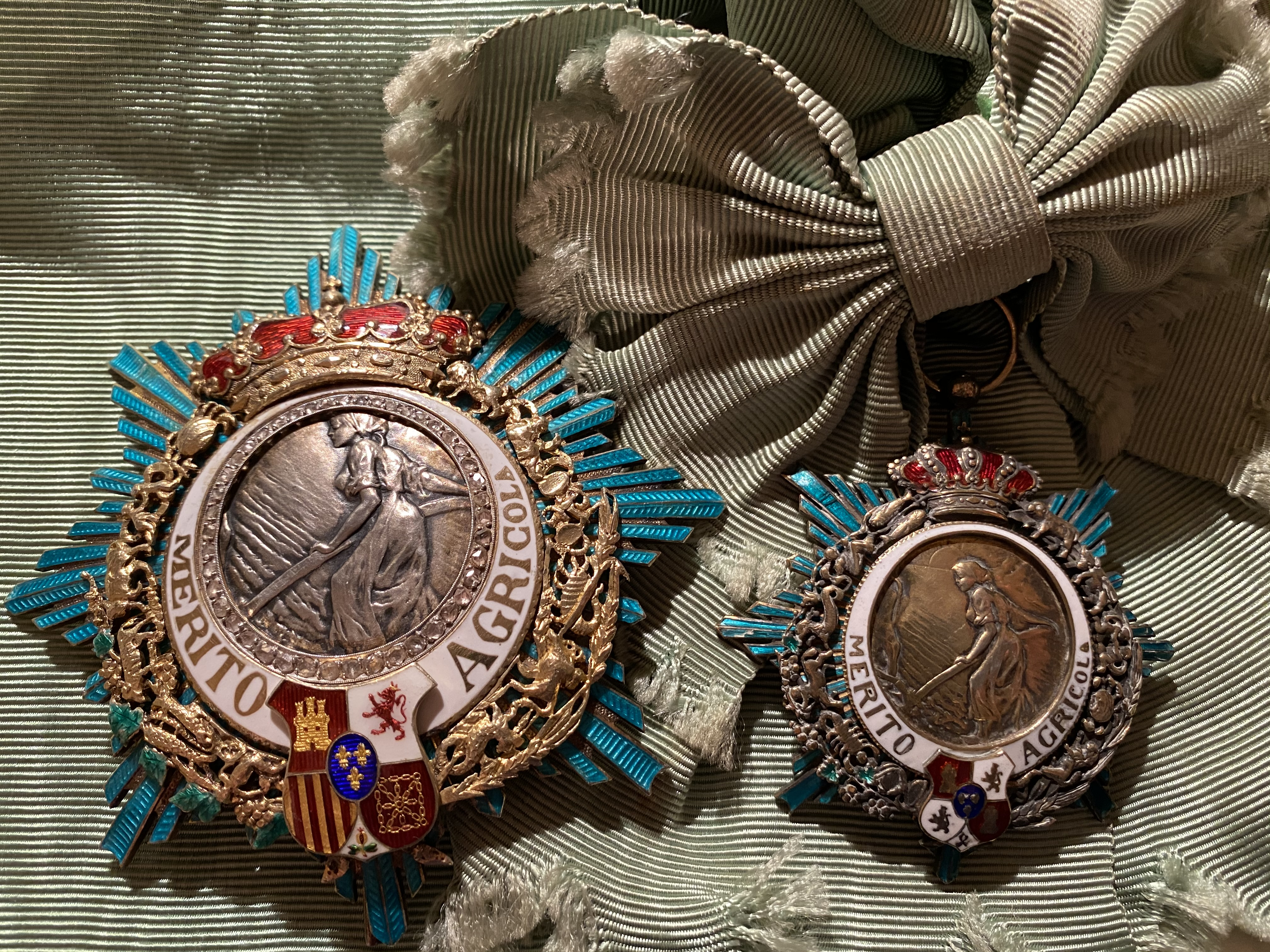
- Grand Cross with diamonds of the Order of Agricultural merit (model 1905-1931).

Awarded by Council of Ministers
- Type: Order of Merit
- Awarded for: Outstanding performance in agriculture, fisheries, and food.
- Grand Chancellor: Minister of Agriculture, Food and Environment

Precedence
- Next (higher): Orden Civil del Mérito Postal
- Next (lower): Orden de las Artes y las Letras de España
- Ribbon bar of the Grand Cross of the order.

The Order of Merit for Agriculture, Fisheries and Food (Spanish: Orden del Mérito Agrario, Pesquero y Alimentario) is a Civil Order of Merit awarded by Spain. It is awarded to recognize people and organizations for outstanding performance in agriculture, fisheries, and food in all its manifestations. The order was established by Royal Decree 421/1987, on 27 February 1987.

== History ==
This order replaced the former Order of Merit for Agriculture (Spanish: Orden Civil del Mérito Agrícola), created on 3 December 1905 and established by Royal Decree on 9 February 1906.

== Classes ==
The classes of the order may be awarded in one of three divisions, agriculture, fisheries, and food. Individuals are awarded one of six classes of the order, while organizations and groups may be recognized by one of three classes of plaque. Awards of the Grand Cross and Gold Plaque are granted by Royal Decree. The Grand Cross and Gold Plaque may be awarded to cover all three divisions.

=== Individuals ===
Individuals are recognized with one of the following six classes of the order:

- Grand Cross (Gran Cruz)
- Commander by Number (Encomienda de Número)
- Commander (Encomienda)
- Officer's Cross (Cruz de Oficial)
- Cross (Cruz)
- Bronze Medal (Medalla de Bronce)

=== Other entities ===
Groups, organizations, and other legal entities are recognized with one of the following three classes:

- Gold Plaque (Placa de Oro)
- Silver Plaque (Placa de Plata)
- Bronze Plaque (Placa de Bronce)
