= Order of Arts and Letters of Spain =

Order of Arts and Letters of Spain Orden de las Artes y las Letras de España
- Badge of the Order of Arts and Letters of Spain

Awarded by His Majesty The King of Spain
- Type: Order of Merit
- Awarded for: Distinguished career in the dissemination of the culture and image of Spain, through its active participation in work or related fields of literary or artistic creation.
- Grand Master: HM The King of Spain
- Chancellor: Minister of Education, Culture and Sport

Precedence
- Next (higher): Orden del Mérito Agrario, Pesquero y Alimentario
- Next (lower): Real Orden del Mérito Deportivo
- Ribbon of the Order

The Order of Arts and Letters of Spain (Spanish: Orden de las Artes y las Letras de España) is a Civil Order of Merit of Spain. Established 24 July 2008, it is awarded to individuals and other entities, both Spanish and foreign, who have distinguished themselves in spreading the culture and image of Spain, through active participation in or work in related fields of literary or artistic creation.

The Order of Arts and Letters of Spain is granted by the King of Spain by Royal Decree, from the nominations of the Ministry of Education, Culture and Sport or other department responsible for cultural action. Before granting the order to a foreign recipient, the Ministry of Foreign Affairs is consulted. The order is presented by the head of the Ministry for culture.

This order has a single category and is purely honorary and carries no monetary reward with its presentation. The order is regulated by Royal Decree 1320/2008, and was initiated by César Antonio Molina, who was then serving as the Minister of Culture.

== Recipients ==
2008

- Richard Serra

2009

- Zahi Hawass
- Claudio Magris
- Predrag Matvejevic
- Hans Magnus Enzensberger
- Dong Yanseng
- Jean-Claude Carrière
- Konstantinos Gavras
- Oscar Niemeyer
- Haruki Murakami

2010

- Metropolitan Museum of Art
- Musée d'Art et d'Histoire
- Royal Museums of Fine Arts of Belgium
- Musée du Louvre
- National Gallery of London
- Direction des Musées de France
- Rijksmuseum
- Tate
- Wallace Collection
- Joan Baez
- Richard Peña
- José Luis Sampedro
- José Andrés
- Aúdio Iturra Seidenglanz
- Luis Rojas Marcos

2011

- Plácido Domingo
- Jorge Semprún (posthumous)
- Hubert Taffin de Givenchy
