= Fabián Estapé =

Spanish economist

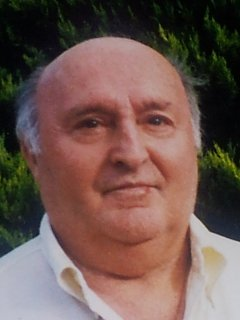
Fabián Estapé in 1997

Fabián Estapé Rodríguez (14 September 1923 – 1 February 2012) was a Spanish economist. He was born in Portbou.

Estapé is considered to have been the person who introduced Joseph A. Schumpeter and John Kenneth Galbraith to Spain. He was an emeritus professor of the University of Barcelona, where he was twice "rector" (vice-chancellor), and a visiting professor at the Universitat Pompeu Fabra. He was also Dean of the Faculty of Economics at the University of Barcelona.

As a "Comisario Adjunto" special advisor in the "Plan de Desarrollo" development plan he was in the Spanish government under Generalisimo Francisco Franco.

Estapé was the author among other works of La reforma tributaria de 1845 (The tax reform of 1845) (1971), Ensayos sobre historia del pensamiento económico (Essays in the history of economic thought) (1971), Una perspectiva española (A Spanish view) (1990) and hundreds of articles and studies on economic policy and the history of economics.

Notoriously opportunistic from a political viewpoint, before the Transición he was a major power player within the neoliberal clique led by Laureano López Rodó during the pragmatic period of economic expansion of the Francoist State and, by his own admission, a highly influential official within the Francoist State; during the latter years of the dictatorship, however, he ostensibly switched his allegiances to the leftist social and political milieu, namely to the Workers' Commissions and the Unified Socialist Party of Catalonia. In 2008 he would publicly recant his past collaboration with Francoist Spain.

Estapé died in León, aged 88.
