= A Town Has Turned to Dust (Playhouse 90) =

- Playhouse 90 episode
- William Shatner as Jerry Paul
- Episode no.: Season 2 Episode 38
- Directed by: John Frankenheimer
- Written by: Rod Serling
- Original air date: June 19, 1958
- Running time: 90 minutes

Guest appearances
- Rod Steiger as Harvey Denton; William Shatner as Jerry Paul; Fay Spain as Annamay Paul; James Gregory as Hennify

Episode chronology
← Previous "The Innocent Sleep"	Next → "The Great Gatsby"

"A Town Has Turned to Dust" is an American television play broadcast live on June 19, 1958, as part of the second season of the CBS television series Playhouse 90. Rod Serling wrote the teleplay, and John Frankenheimer directed. Rod Steiger and William Shatner starred.

Serling originally wrote the story about the lynching of a young African-American in the Southern United States. Due to objections from the program's commercial sponsors, who were concerned with offending white Southern viewers, it was not produced and aired until Serling moved the story's setting out of the South and changed the victim from black to Mexican.

== Plot ==
The production opens with a reporter, Hennify, dictating the story of a lynching to be wired back to his newspaper in St. Louis. The teleplay then flashes back with Hennify serving as the narrator.

Pancho Rivera, a 19-year-old Mexican boy, is jailed in Dempseyville, a small southwestern town suffering from drought and heat. Pancho is charged with attempted robbery of the general store and assault on the wife of the shopkeeper, Jerry Paul. Paul leads a mob to the jail. Rather than defend Pancho from the mob, the sheriff, Harvey Denton, turns Rivera over to the mob. Pancho is hanged.

The mob celebrates at the saloon after the lynching. Hennify confronts Paul and Denton. He asks what the penalty would have been if Rivera had been convicted rather than lynched. Hennify is told the penalty would have been five to ten years in prison.

The next day, Hennify visits Paul's store. Hennify observes a mark on the face of Paul's wife, Annamay, and notes that the mark matches the ring on Paul's hand. After Hennify leaves, Annamay accuses Paul of killing an innocent boy. Paul warns her not to damage his good name and throws her to the ground. Denton enters the store and confronts Paul with his suspicion that Paul killed Pancho. Denton suspects that Annamay was in love with Pancho.

The town's Mexican residents stop patronizing Paul's store. They stand in silent protest outside the store. Paul taunts Pancho's brother, Ramon, challenging him to enter the segregated saloon. Ramon enters the saloon and strikes Paul three times with a whip. Paul stirs up the white patrons by blaming the Mexicans for the town's problems. He again leads a mob to the jail, demanding that Ramon be turned over. This time, Denton refuses and speaks to the mob. Annamay appears and tells the mob that she loved Pancho and that was why Paul killed Pancho. Paul and Denton exchange gunfire. Denton is wounded, and Paul is killed.

Denton tells the priest that there is no absolution for him or for the mob. He confesses that he led a mob 16 years earlier that killed an elderly man. Denton then collapses and dies. That night, the drought that has plagued Dempseyville ends as rain begins to fall. Hennify writes that the rain came too late, because the town had already turned to dust due to prejudice and violence.

== Cast ==
Robert Ryan hosted the show, in which the following cast received screen credit for their performances.

- Rod Steiger as Harvey Denton
- William Shatner as Jerry Paul
- Fay Spain as Annamay Paul
- James Gregory as Hennify the reporter
- Mario Alcalde as Ramon Rivera
- Martin Garralaga as Priest
- Eugene Iglesias as Pancho Rivera
- Malcolm Atterbury as Jenkins
- Paul Lambert as Danny
- Sandy Kenyon as Billy
- Clegg Hoyt as Flagg
- Eddie Ryder as Pete Ankers
- Helen Kleeb as Mrs. Flagg
- Míriam Colón as Dolores

== Production ==
Martin Manulis was the producer, and John Frankenheimer directed. Rod Serling wrote the teleplay. The production was broadcast live on June 19, 1958, from Television City in Los Angeles. It was part of the second season of Playhouse 90, an anthology television series that was voted "the greatest television series of all time" in a 1970 poll of television editors.

The production received three nominations for the 11th Primetime Emmy Awards: Frankenheimer for best direction of a single dramatic program, one hour or longer; Serling for best writing of a single dramatic program, one hour or longer; and Rod Steiger for best single performance by an actor.

Serling's teleplay was remade in 1998 as a science fiction film for the Sci-Fi Channel.

=== Censorship ===
Serling originally wrote the story about lynching in the Southern United States based on the killing of Emmett Till in particular. Concerned with offending white viewers in the South, the program's commercial sponsors were unwilling to tackle Southern racism. Serling was only able to have the story told by switching the time to the late 19th century, the setting to the southwest, and the victim to a Mexican. Serling recalled:

By the time A Town Has Turned to Dust went before the cameras my script had turned to dust . . . Emmett Till became a romantic Mexican who loved the storekeeper's wife, but 'only with his eye.' . . . The setting was moved to the Southwest in the 1870's . . . The phrase 'twenty men in hoods' became 'twenty men in homemade masks.' They chopped it up like a roomful of butchers at work on a steer.

Despite the compromises, Serling biographer Nicholas Parisi observed, "the true target" of Serling's contempt "could hardly have been clearer" than in Sheriff Denton's reply when the mob's leader claims the Mexicans "need to be taught a lesson". In particular, Denton replied:

That's all they've had for a hundred years is a lesson! We've been the teacher. We taught 'em to turn their cheeks, we taught 'em to bow their heads, we taught 'em to say 'yessir.' . . . That's all they've ever had is a lesson! Now, what is left to teach 'em? How to stop breathing in a noose?

Another sponsor, Prudential Insurance Co., objected to the original ending of the story in which Sheriff Denton committed suicide. The ending was therefore changed so that Denton died from a gunshot wound.

== Reception ==
In The New York Times, Jack Gould called it "powerful drama" and "a raw, tough and at the same time deeply moving outcry against prejudice." He praised Serling's "vivid dialogue, Frankenheimer's "simply superb" direction, and the "superlative" performances of Steiger and Shatner.

William Ewald of the UPI called it "a play with good bones", "plenty of meat", and "dialogue that swirled." However, he felt that production was not wholly successful because the portrayals were "too black and white".

In The Boston Globe, Elizabeth W. Driscoll called it "a taut 90 minutes of live-from-Hollywood theatre."

Bill Fiset of the Oakland Tribune wrote that its tackling of racial intolerance made it "a milestone for television" and "one of the meatiest dramas the program has ever presented"—not "meek or sterile" like so much television drama. He also credited strong acting by Steiger and Shatner and excellent direction.

== BBC version ==
In 1960, the play was remade by BBC Television in the United Kingdom. Broadcast on 3 July that year, Steiger reprised his lead role, with Alvin Rakoff producing and directing. The Daily Telegraph called the production "A stark and savage drama - only occasionally dropping into melodrama," while the Daily Mirror reported that "The usual bunch of lunatics had rung up to protest against children being exposed to a tough scene."
