= Barbara Jane Reams =

American actress

- Born: April 7, 1976 (age 49); Burley, Idaho, United States
- Other names: Barbara Jane Calchera
- Occupation: Actress
- Years active: 1997–1999
- Spouse: Douglas Calchera (m. 1999–present

Barbara Jane Reams (a.k.a. Barbara Jane Calchera; born April 7, 1976, in Burley, Idaho), is a former American television actress.

== Filmography ==
Television

Year	Title	Role	Notes
1997	Promised Land	Charlotte	"Crushed" (season 2, episode 4)
1998	A Town Has Turned to Dust	Maya Paul (Jerry's Wife)	TV movie
1999	The Substitute 3: Winner Takes All	Albanian Girl	Direct to video
2000	Beyond the Prairie: The True Story of Laura Ingalls Wilder	Mary Ingalls	TV miniseries
