= José Luis Sampedro =

Spanish economist and writer (1917–2013)

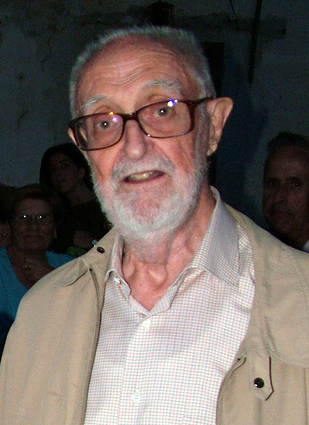
- Born: José Luis Sampedro Sáez; 1 February 1917; Barcelona, Spain
- Died: 8 April 2013 (aged 96); Madrid, Spain
- Citizenship: Spanish
- Education: University Complutense, Madrid
- Occupations: Economist, writer
- Known for: Human rights advocacy

Seat F of the Real Academia Española
- In office 2 June 1991 – 8 April 2013
- Preceded by: Manuel Halcón
- Succeeded by: Manuel Gutiérrez Aragón

José Luis Sampedro Sáez (Barcelona, 1 February 1917 – Madrid, 8 April 2013) was a Spanish economist and writer who advocated an economy "more humane, more caring, able to help develop the dignity of peoples". Academician of the Real Academia Española since 1990, he was the recipient of the Order of Arts and Letters of Spain, the Menéndez Pelayo International Prize (2010) and the Spanish Literature National Prize (2011). He became an inspiration for the anti-austerity movement in Spain.

== Biography ==
In 1917, the year of his birth, his family moved to Tangier (Morocco), where he lived until aged thirteen. In 1936, he was mobilized by the Republican faction in the Spanish Civil War, fighting in an anarchist battalion. He spent the war serving variously in Catalonia, Guadalajara, Castilla-La Mancha, and Huete (Cuenca). After the war, he was again called up and served in the garrison of the Spanish enclave of Melilla in North Africa.

After the war, he obtained work as a customs officer in Santander before moving to Madrid, where, in 1944, he married Isabel Pellicer before completing his university studies in Economics in 1947, winning, in the process, the award of an "Extraordinary Prize".

Thereafter, he started working with a major Spanish financial institution at that moment, the Banco Exterior de España, whilst also teaching at the university. In 1955, he became the professor of Economic policy at the Complutense University of Madrid, which post he held until 1969, combining teaching with various positions in the Banco Exterior de España, where he reached the post of deputy general manager. Meanwhile, he published academic works about the post economic reality and structural analysis and the European future of Spain and also wrote his first theatrical play A place to live (1955).

Around 1965 and 1966, there was a purge of prominent university professors in Spain including the philosopher es:José Luis López Aranguren and socialist lawyer Enrique Tierno Galván, as a result of which he decided to become a visiting professor at the Universities of Salford and Liverpool in North West England.

Along with other teachers, Sampedro created the Spanish Center for Studies and Research (CEISA), a symbol of intellectual independence which would be closed in Francoist Spain three years later. In 1968, he was appointed as Anna Howard Shaw lecturer at Bryn Mawr College for women in Philadelphia, USA.

On his return to Spain, he requested a leave of absence from Complutense University and published a satirical play called the naked horse. After the death of Francisco Franco, he returned in 1976 to the Banco Exterior de España as a consultant economist. In 1977, he was appointed senator by Royal prerogative of King Juan Carlos, then, following the first democratic Spanish general election, 1977, he was elected as a socialist senator, a post he held until 1979.

In parallel to his professional activity as an economist, he published several novels and continued to write after his official retirement, achieving great successes with works like October, October, Etruscan smile, or Old siren. Sadly, his literary successes coincided with the tragic news of the death of his wife, Isabel Pellicer, in 1986.

In 1990, he was appointed member of the Royal Spanish Academy, the definitive authority on the Castilian Spanish where his heterodox inaugural address, From the border related to the subject of his novel The old siren, published that same year, which can be considered a Spanish hymn to life, love and tolerance.

In 2003, the widowed Sampedro was remarried to the writer, poet and translator es:Olga Lucas in the spa town of Alhama de Aragón. Thereafter, he spent part of the year in Tenerife, in the Canary Islands, whose symbol, the Dracaena draco tree, is home to the Tenerife blue chaffinch on the volcanic peak of Mount Teide, which inspired him to write The path of the dragon tree.

He exercised his critical humanism about what he viewed as the moral and social disruption arising from Western style Neoliberalism and Capitalism. In reference to this, he collaborated with the Anti-austerity movement in Spain during May 2011 by writing the preface to the Spanish edition of the book Time for Outrage by the French diplomat Stéphane Hessel.

Sampedro died on 8 April 2013, in Madrid, aged 96.

== Awards ==
In 2002, Sampedro was appointed honorary non-executive chairman of the Spanish telecommunications company Sintratel, along with Nobel prizewinner José Saramago. Sintratel is a skit on sin trabajo telecoms or telecommunications workers without work.

In 2008, he was awarded the Medal of the Order of Charlemagne by the Principality of Andorra. In April 2009 he was invested as Doctor Honoris Causa of the University of Seville.

In 2010, was awarded the XXIV Menéndez Pelayo International Prize for his "many contributions to human thought" as, variously, an economist, writer, and teacher. Additionally, the Spanish Council of Ministers awarded Sampedro the Order of Arts and Letters of Spain on 15 November 2010 for "his outstanding literary career and his thought committed to the problems of his time". In 2011, he received the Premio Nacional de las Letras Españolas.

On 24 May 2012, he was invested Doctor Honoris Causa by the University of Alcalá near Madrid.

=== Aranjuez ===
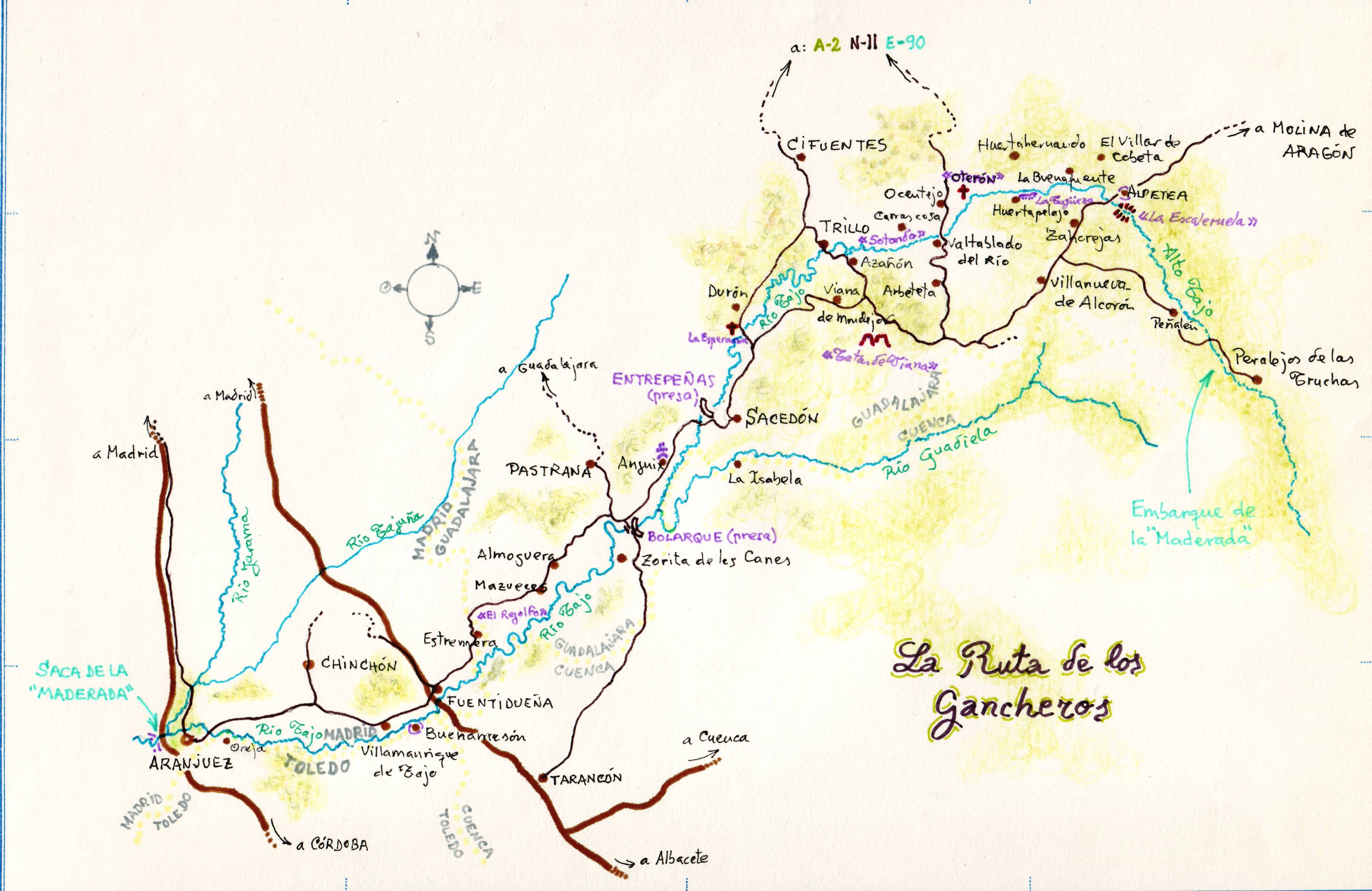
Route followed by wood transporters of the Tagus River in The river that leads...

In his novel Royal Site, Sampedro takes a tour of the Royal Palace of Aranjuez and its gardens. Echoing the sentiments of the geographer es:Thomas Lopez. That Aranjuez is the real and true center of Spain. Aranjuez is also the final terminal of a route followed by timber rafters floating timber to the sawmills along the Rio Tajo in the novel A river that leads.

He is celebrated locally in the José Sampedro Centro de Educación de Adultos and a conference room of the municipal cultural center.

== Works ==
=== Novels ===
Los círculos del tiempo trilogy:

1. Octubre, octubre (1981), ISBN 9788420420547
2. La vieja sirena (1990), ISBN 9788423318704
3. Real Sitio (1993), ISBN 9788466336444

Stand-alones:

- La estatua de Adolfo Espejo (1939, published 1994), ISBN 9788420481456
- La sombra de los días (1947, published 1994), ISBN 9788420481463
- Congreso en Estocolmo (1952), ISBN 9788420420035
- El río que nos lleva (1961), ISBN 9788422628002
- El caballo desnudo (1970), ISBN 9788420421810
- La sonrisa etrusca (1985), ISBN 9780679763383
- El amante lesbiano (2000), ISBN 9788401341526
- La senda del drago (2006), ISBN 9788401341878
- Cuarteto para un solista (2011), cowritten with Olga Lucas, ISBN 9788401340000

=== Short stories ===
Collections:

- Mar al fondo (1992), collection of 10 short stories, ISBN 9788423322114:
  "Ártico", "Mediterráneo", "Báltico", "Índico", "Land's End", "Caribe", "Egeo", "Mar del Sur", "Mar Amarillo", "Antártico"
- Mientras la tierra gira (1993), collection of 32 short stories, ISBN 9788423322565:
  "Primer grupo": "La sombra de los días", "Etapa", "Trayecto final", "La sierva y el ángel", "Un día feliz", "El tratado con Laponia", "La felicidad", "El agostero", "Una visita", "El buen pan", "Tormenta en el campo", "Gregorio Martín"
  "Segundo grupo": "La noche de Cajamarca", "Viajero", "Arca número dos", "Junto a la ventana", "Fantasía de Año Nuevo", "Un puñado de tierra", "El hombre fiel", "La isla sumergida", "Un caso de cosmoetnología: la religión hispánica", "La bendición de Dios", "Sabiduría sufí", "El llanto de la llave perdida"
  "Tercer grupo": "Ebenezer", "Aquel instante en Chipre", "En la misma piel del tigre", "A Erika", "Divino diván", "La Mortitecnia, industria de Occidente", "Felisa", "Iniciación"

Uncollected short stories:

- "La balada del agua" (2008), ISBN 9788415597957

=== Plays ===
- La paloma de cartón (1948, printed in 2007)
- Un sitio para vivir (1955, printed in 2007), ISBN 9788415028017
- El nudo (1982)

=== Poems ===
- Días en blanco: Poesía completa (2020), collection, ISBN 9788401024542

=== Non-fiction ===
Economy

- Principios prácticos de localización industrial (1957), ASIN B000LL7LPA
- Realidad económica y análisis estructural (1959), ASIN B00M0W8JMM
- Lecciones de estructura Económica (1965), ASIN B00DVXPP7G
- Las fuerzas económicas de nuestro tiempo (1967), ISBN 9780303175667
- Estructura económica: teoría básica y estructura mundial (1969), ASIN B00SB7K70W
- Conciencia del subdesarrollo series:
  1. Conciencia del subdesarrollo (1973), ISBN 9788434573246
  2. Conciencia del subdesarrollo veinticinco años después (1996), cowritten with Carlos Berzosa, ISBN 9788430600304
- Inflación: una versión completa (1976)
- La Inflación: Prótesis del sistema, or La inflación (al alcance de los ministros) (1985), ISBN 9788485859924
- El mercado y nosotros (1986), ISBN 9788485337699
- Dulce cintura de América (1991), cowritten with Luis Ramírez Benéytez and Luis de Sebastián, ISBN 9788440498892
- El mercado y la globalización (2002), ISBN 9788423334094
- Los mongoles en Bagdad (2003), ISBN 9788423335756
- Multimegamuchaglobalización (2008), cowritten with Carlos Berzosa and Ángel Martínez González-Tablas, ISBN 9788474919028
- Economía humanista. Algo más que cifras (2009), ISBN 9788483068281
- Economía eres tú (2015), ISBN 9788460817895

Autobiographies

- Escribir es vivir (2005), cowritten with Olga Lucas, ISBN 9788401341861
- La escritura necesaria (2006), essay-dialogue on his novels and his life
- Monte Sinaí (2012), ISBN 9788497931953
- Sala de espera (2014), ISBN 9788401343056

Others

- Fronteras (1995), opinion
- Con nombre y apellidos, or Con nombre y apellidos: cómo localizar a nuestros antepasados (1999), guide, ISBN 9788427024397
- Las joyas de las reinas de España (2004), cowritten with Fernando Rayón, art, ISBN 9788408051190
- Conversaciones sobre política, mercado y convivencia (2006), cowritten with Carlos Taibo Arias, politics, ISBN 8483192616
- La ciencia y la vida (2008), dialogue next to the cardiologist Valentín Fuster ordered by Olga Lucas, ISBN 9788401336768
- Reacciona: 10 razones por las que debes actuar frente a la crisis económica, política y social (2011), cowritten with Federico Mayor Zaragoza, Baltasar Garzón, Juan Torres López, Àngels Martínez Castells, Rosa María Artal, Ignacio Escolar, Carlos Martínez Alonso, Javier López Facal, Javier Pérez de Albéniz and Lourdes Lucía, politics, ISBN 9788403102002
- Pregón de la rosa (2013), speech, ISBN 9788415597704
- La vida perenne (2015), philosophy, ISBN 9788401347344

== Adaptations ==
- El río que nos lleva (1989), film directed by Antonio del Real, based on novel El río que nos lleva
- The Etruscan Smile (2018), film directed by Oded Binnun and Mihal Brezis, based on novel La sonrisa etrusca

== See also ==
- Time for Outrage!
