= A Town Has Turned to Dust (1998 film) =

1998 remake

- Based on: A Town Has Turned to Dust by Rod Serling
- Directed by: Rob Nilsson
- Starring: Stephen Lang; Ron Perlman; Gabriel Olds; Barbara Jane Reams
- Music by: Tim Alexander
- Country of origin: United States
- Original language: English

Production
- Cinematography: Mickey Freeman
- Editor: Josh Peterson
- Running time: 90 minutes

Original release
- Network: Sci-Fi Channel
- Release: June 20, 1998

A Town Has Turned to Dust is a 1998 remake of A Town Has Turned to Dust (1958), written by Rod Serling. It was originally shown on the Sci-Fi Channel.

== Plot ==
Jerry Paul is a successful, racist dweller-merchant whose wife is overly attentive to their driver-servant Tommy. Jerry has Tommy arrested on false charges of rape and theft. The town's Sheriff Denton is unable to stop a lynch mob led by Jerry from lynching Tommy but the incident is recorded by a TV reporter named Hannify, who is visiting Earth from New Angeles. The rest of the story revolves around how the report is used, revelations of a past crime, and a showdown in the style of High Noon.

== Cast ==
- Stephen Lang (Sheriff Harvey Denton)
- Ron Perlman (Jerry Paul)
- Gabriel Olds (Hannify)
- Barbara Jane Reams (Maya Paul)
- Frankie Avina (Tooth)
- Zahn McClarnon (Tommy Tall Bear)
- Judy Collins (Ree)
- M. Scott Wilkinson (Wavy Flagg)
