= Palacio del Infantado, Guadalajara =

Palace of the Infantage
- Palacio del Infantado (Spanish)
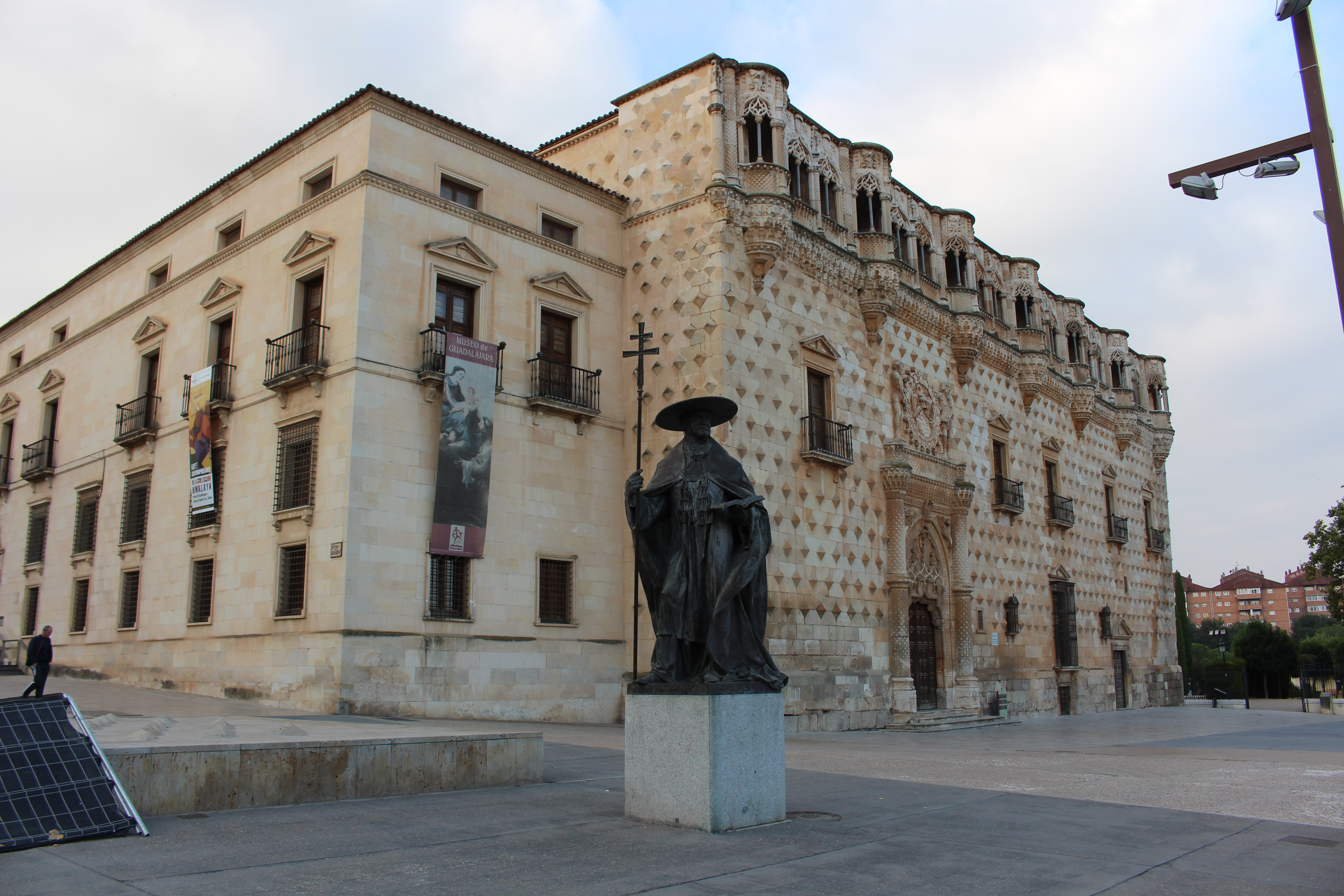

- Location within Spain
- 40.636944°N 3.1675°W
- Location: Guadalajara, Spain

Spanish Cultural Heritage
- Official name: Palacio del Infantado
- Type: Non-movable
- Criteria: Monument
- Designated: 1914
- Reference no.: RI-51-0000134

The Palace of El Infantado (Spanish: Palacio del Infantado) is a palace located in Guadalajara, Spain. An example of the Isabelline architectural style, it dates from the 15th century and was the seat of the Dukes of the Infantado.

== Conservation and access ==
The building has been protected by a heritage listing, currently Bien de Interés Cultural, since 1914, but was one of a number of buildings in Guadalajara which suffered damage in the Spanish Civil War. Since 1973, it houses the Museum of Guadalajara.
