= The Substitute 2: School's Out =

- DVD cover
- Directed by: Steven Pearl
- Written by: Roy Frumkes; Rocco Simonelli
- Based on: Characters by Roy Frumkes; Rocco Simonelli; Alan Ormsby
- Produced by: Morrie Eisenman; Robert Salerno
- Starring: Treat Williams; BD Wong; Angel David; Michael Michele; Lawrence Gilliard Jr.
- Cinematography: Larry Banks
- Music by: Joe Delia
- Distributed by: Artisan Entertainment
- Release date: August 1, 1998
- Running time: 90 minutes
- Country: United States
- Language: English

The Substitute 2: School's Out is a 1998 straight-to-DVD action-crime-thriller film directed by Steven Pearl and starring Treat Williams as Carl Thomasson (later spelled Karl in the sequels), a mercenary who masquerades as a teacher in order to enter a tough urban school and wreak his revenge upon his brother's killer.

The film has very little connection to The Substitute, other than Joey Six (protagonist Jonathan Shale's only surviving mercenary in the first film, this time portrayed by Angel David instead of Raymond Cruz) aiding Thomasson during the course of the movie. A reference early in the film indicates, through a photograph and short conversation between Thomasson and Joey Six, that Shale and Jane Hetzko (Shale's girlfriend) had married and now teach in foreign nations as part of the Peace Corps. It is also noted that Shale and Thomasson had served in the Army, as well as worked as mercenaries together.

== Plot ==
Randall Thomasson is gunned down while attempting to stop a carjacking. His brother, Karl, attends his funeral and attempts to make amends with his niece, who is angry that Karl never contacted her or her father.

Karl decides to investigate his brother's death, and goes undercover as a teacher, facing cynical and reluctant faculty, violent and disruptive students, and a system that—to Karl's eyes—has become broken from the inside, all while attempting to protect his teenage niece.

Recruiting Joey Six and a rather unorthodox janitor, Thomasson turns the school into an after-hours battleground, fighting against well-armed gang members, and—eventually—the school's auto-repair teacher (BD Wong), a former mercenary who is also involved in the gang's chop-shop operation.

== Cast ==
- Treat Williams as Karl Thomasson
- BD Wong as Warren Drummond
- Angel David as Joey Six
- Michael Michele as Kara LaVelle
- Lawrence Gilliard Jr. as Dontae
- Susan May Pratt as Anya Thomasson
- Edoardo Ballerini as Danny Bramson
- Daryl Edwards as Jonathan Bartee
- Paul Lazar as Mack Weathers
- Eugene Byrd as Mace
- Shawn McLean as "Badass"
- Guru as "Little B"
- Christopher Cousins as Randall Thomasson
- Chuck Jeffreys as Willy
- Owen Stadele as Joel

== Sequels ==
Two direct-to-DVD sequels were made.
