= Guadalajara, Spain =

Guadalajara
- Municipality
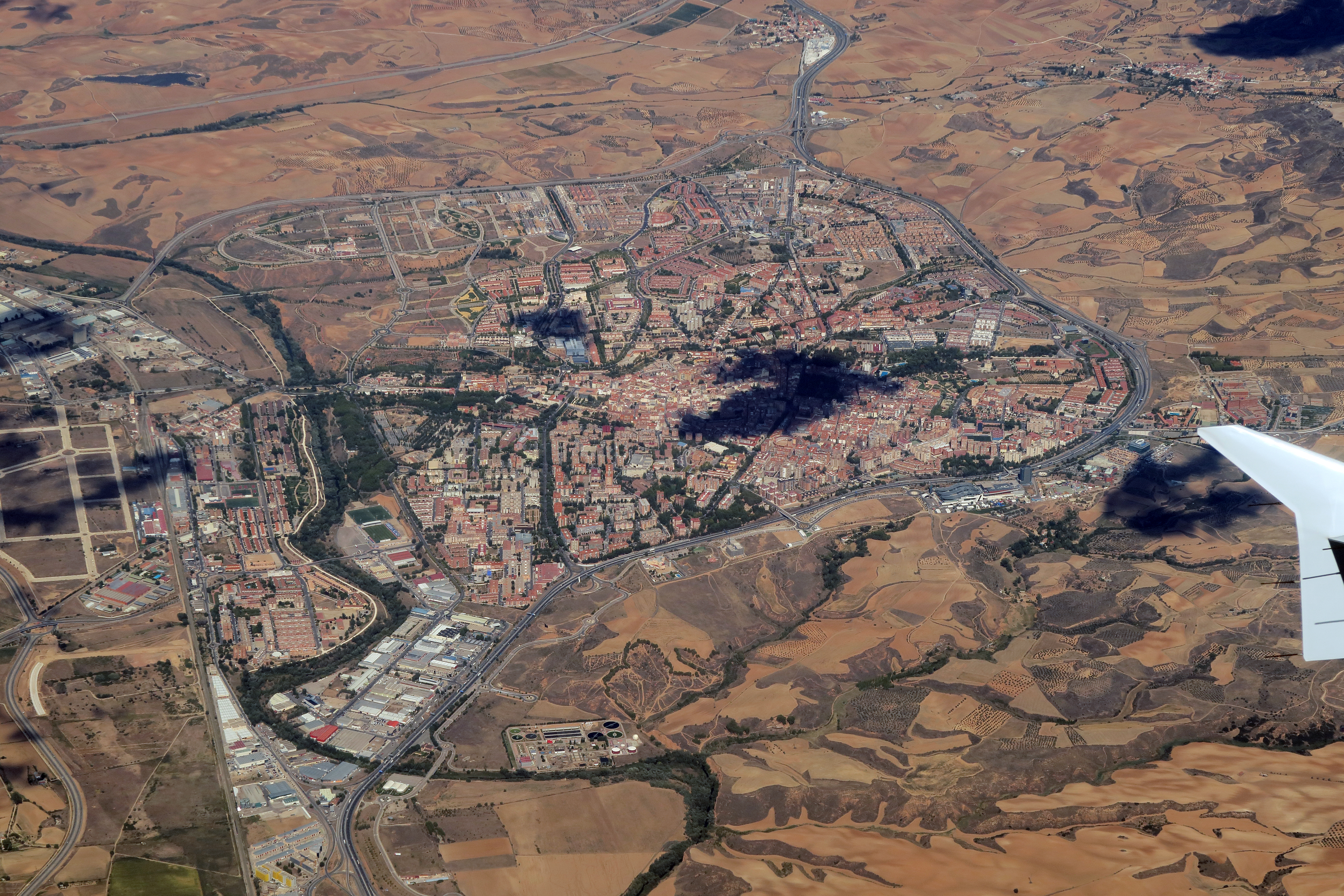
- Aerial view

- Flag Coat of arms
- Interactive map of Guadalajara
- Location in the Province of Guadalajara, Castilla–La Mancha and Spain Guadalajara (Spain)
- Coordinates: 40°38′1.36″N 3°10′2.62″W
- Country: Spain
- Region: Castilla–La Mancha
- Province: Guadalajara

Government
  - Type: Ayuntamiento
  - Body: Ayuntamiento de Guadalajara
  - Mayor: Ana Guarinos (PP)

Area
  - Total: 235.49 km^{2} (90.92 sq mi)
- Elevation: 708 m (2,323 ft)
- Highest elevation: 972 m (3,189 ft)
- Lowest elevation: 620 m (2,030 ft)

Population (2025)
  - Total: 93,470
  - Density: 396.9/km^{2} (1,028/sq mi)
- Demonyms: Guadalajareño/a (Note: Guadalajareño/a is the most popular demonym. Other demonyms include arriacense, caracense, caraceño, caracitano and alcarreño. Derisive demonyms include arrastrao, embustero or del chascao (the latter applied to the wider province).)
- Time zone: UTC+1 (CET)
  - Summer (DST): UTC+2 (CEST)
- Postal code: 19001–5
- Dialing code: 949
- Website: www.guadalajara.es

Guadalajara (/ˌɡwɑːdələˈhɑːrə/ GWAH-də-lə-HAR-ə, Spanish: [ɡwaðalaˈxaɾa]) is a city and municipality in Spain, located in the autonomous community of Castilla–La Mancha. It is the capital of the Province of Guadalajara.

Guadalajara lies on the central part of the Iberian Peninsula at roughly 685 meters (2,247 ft) above sea level. Most of the city housing is located on the left (southern) bank of the Henares, in between the river and the moors of La Alcarria. In addition to the city, the municipality also includes the villages of Iriépal, Taracena, Usanos, and Valdenoches. As of 1 January 2025, Guadalajara has a registered population of 93,470, which makes it the region's second most populated municipality.

Founded in the 9th century as Madīnat al-Faraŷ under the Emirate of Córdoba, it became a stronghold of the Masmuda Berber clan of the Banū Sālim. After the Christian conquest of the Taifa of Toledo in 1085, it grew into a sizable town of the Crown of Castile under control of the Mendoza family. It was a hub for mystical iluminismo in the 16th century in the Kingdom of Toledo. Depopulation and decay of key economy parametres ensued in the 17th century. Growth in the 21st century was caused by its closeness to the functional urban area of Madrid.

== History ==
=== Alleged identification with Arriaca ===
A Roman mansio called Arriaca, possibly founded by a pre-Roman culture, is presumed to have been located in the region. There is however no archeological proof of its existence, only references in texts such as the Ruta Antonina, which describe it as being in the hands of the Carpetani when encountered by the Romans.

=== Early Middle Ages ===
The founding of Guadalajara, dating from the Islamic period, is attributed to a person named "Faraŷ". (Note: This Faray has been identified either with Faraŷ Ibn Masarra Ibn Sālim (d. 832) or with Faraŷ b. Sālim (son of the founder of Medinaceli), who would have probably settled in the area after his father founded Medinaceli. According to a fuzzy passage by the geographer Ya'qubi, Tariq and Musa handed Arriaca to M. Ibn Faraŷ al-Sinhâyî and the place was hereby renamed.) It was officially known as Madīnat al-Faraŷ in the 9th and 10th centuries. The town was later known as Wādī Al-Ḥijāra (Arabic: وادي الحجارة), possibly meaning 'river of stones' (as in river gravel); in theory it may be a literal translation of the Iberian name Arriaca. It has also been proposed that Ḥajāra should not be understood as 'stones'/'gravel', but in the sense of 'castles' or 'fortified rocks'.

Wādī Al-Ḥijāra and its surroundings were part of the Middle March of Al-Andalus, controlled by the Masmuda Berber clan of the Banū Sālim who governed on behalf of the Umayyad rulers of Córdoba. During the Muslim period an alcázar (fortress) was built by the mid-9th century, as well as the Bridge over the Henares (its construction has been tentatively dated by the late 10th century or early 11th century). Walls enclosing the city were also built by then. In 920, the Banū Sālim were routed from Wādī Al-Ḥijāra (reportedly because the local population resented their rule) by Abd al-Rahman III, who attempted to directly rule the territory.

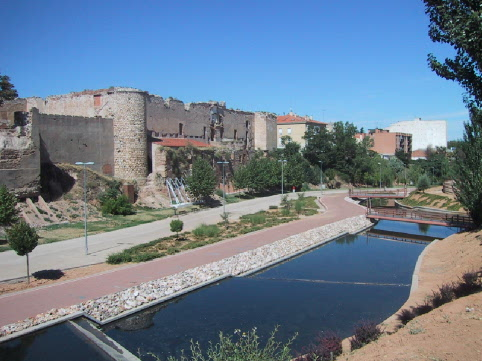
Remains of the "Alcázar of Guadalajara", built in the 9th century

The city was part of the territory annexed by Alfonso VI of León and Castile in the 1085 conquest of the Taifa of Toledo, with Wādī Al-Ḥijāra surrendering and offering no resistance. Tradition claims however that a contingent led by Álvar Fáñez de Minaya (one of the lieutenants of El Cid) seized the city on 24 June, at night.

The area was repopulated with people from the North (Castilians from the mountains and Merindades, Basques and Navarreses mainly).

Alfonso VII granted Guadalajara its first fuero on 3 May 1133. This charter progressively incorporated several amendments. The second fuero, probably conceived during the reign of Alfonso VIII, was anyway confirmed by Ferdinand III on 26 May 1219 and 13 April 1251.

For most of its history, up until the 20th century, Guadalajara's water supply came from two sources: the Henares river and the springs located along the cornice formed by the border of the limestone moors of La Alcarria. Control over the scarce water resources was fought over and it became a symbol of social status for the local nobility during the Late Middle Ages.

During the reign of Alfonso X of Castile (r. 1253–1284), the protection of the king allowed the city to develop its economy by protecting merchants and allowing markets.

=== Rule of the Mendozas ===
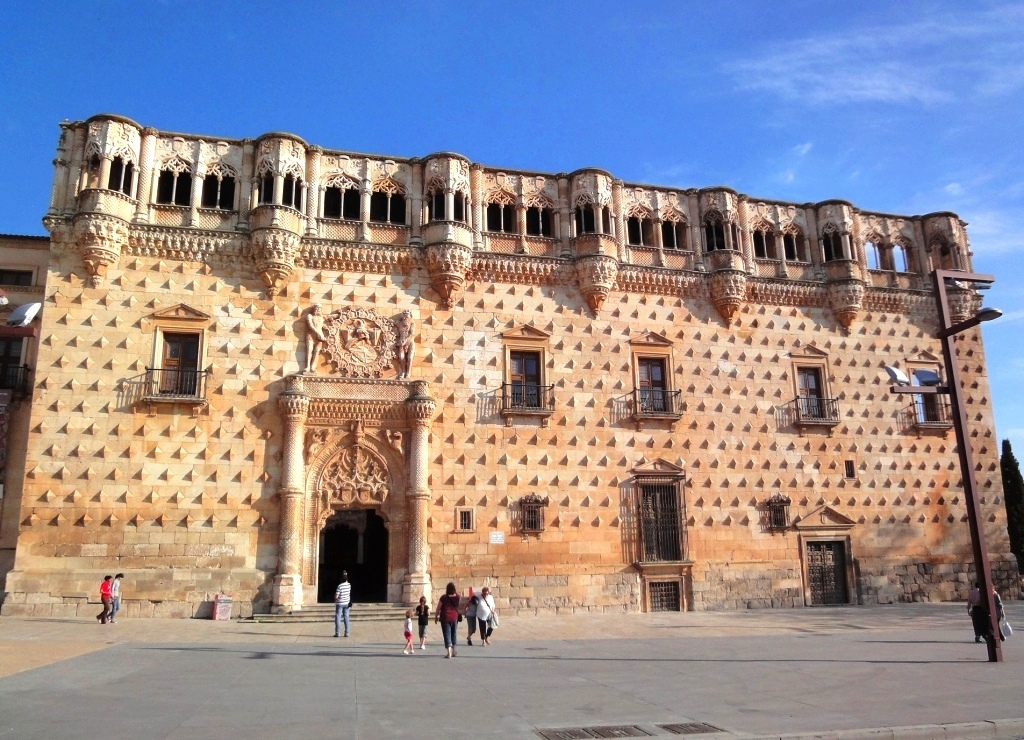
Isabelline style Palacio del Infantado (15th century)

Traditionally a realengo ('royal demesne') town, with a vote in the Cortes of Castile, the town came under the influence of the powerful Mendoza family until well into the Early Modern period. Despite the former meddling that underpinned the political control of the city, Guadalajara was not enshrined as formal seigneurial jurisdiction of the Mendozas in a legal sense.

The Mendoza family held the title of Dukes and Duchesses of El Infantado from 1475. On 25 March 1460, Guadalajara was granted the status of 'city' by Henry IV. Literature and arts were promoted under the patronage of the Mendozas in which came to be termed as the Atenas alcarreña ('Alcarria's Athens'). Likewise, the city's economy prospered thanks to the development of a specialised artisanate and a bustling trade.

In the Middle Ages, Guadalajara was home to a large Jewish community that maintained four synagogues as well as other communal institutes, including the society Malbish Arumim ("Clothe the Naked") and a study house or yeshiva. These included the Great Synagogue, the Synagogue of the Toledanos (established by Jews from Toledo), the Synagogue de los Matutes (or Old Synagogue), and another known as the Midras. Around the time of the 1492 expulsion, the synagogues became the subject of disputes among local religious institutions. The Great Synagogue was sold in May 1492 and soon transferred to the church of Santa María de la Fuente, which converted it into a hospital. The Synagogue of the Toledanos was granted to the monastery of San Antolín for use as a hospital and home for aged friars.

In the early 16th century, the city was one of the main focal points of the iluminismo (or alumbrados) in the Kingdom of Toledo, linked to heterodox religious figures such as Isabel de la Cruz and María de Cazalla.

In the context of the Revolt of the Comuneros across the Crown of Castile, the comunero rebels in Guadalajara, as early as 5 June 1520, asked the Duke of the Infantado, Diego Hurtado de Mendoza, to join the anti-imperial revolt. The demonstrators lit the houses of the procurators who went to the Cortes of La Coruña to vote in favour of the taxes and obligations levied by Emperor Charles V. The Duke of Infantado played a cautious waiting game to see which side would win, finally choosing to endorse the Emperor in 1521. He ordered the beheading of the local leaders of the insurgency and the deportation of his own son and successor Íñigo López de Mendoza, who had leaned towards the comunero cause.

By 1591, the city had a population of 6,754.

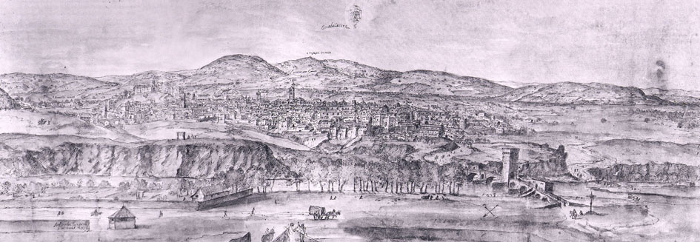
Drawing of Guadalajara in the 1560s, by Anton van den Wyngaerde. The view, from the North, visibly features the Bridge over the Henares, then a turreted bridge.

=== Crisis ===
The Crisis of the 17th century took a heavy toll in many Castilian cities, and particularly in Guadalajara. The city was affected by the 1610 expulsion of the moriscos both in terms of the net demographic loss (10% of the population) as well as by their critical weight in key sectors of the local economy such as the artisanate and trade. Many palaces were left forsaken. The Mendozas left the city for good in 1657.

During the War of the Spanish Succession, in the early 18th century, Guadalajara was sacked. Ravaged by the Austracist army, a largely ruined Guadalajara hit then its lowest demographic point, with only around 2,200 inhabitants. Without external assistance the city may have simply ceased to exist. The 20,000,000 maravedies indebted to the Royal Treasury were forgiven in 1716. Philip V ordered the establishment of the Real Fábrica de Paños (Royal Factory of Clothes), which was opened in the city in 1719 in the Palacio del Marqués de Montesclaros, critically helping the city to move on from the calamitous situation it found itself.

=== Contemporary times ===
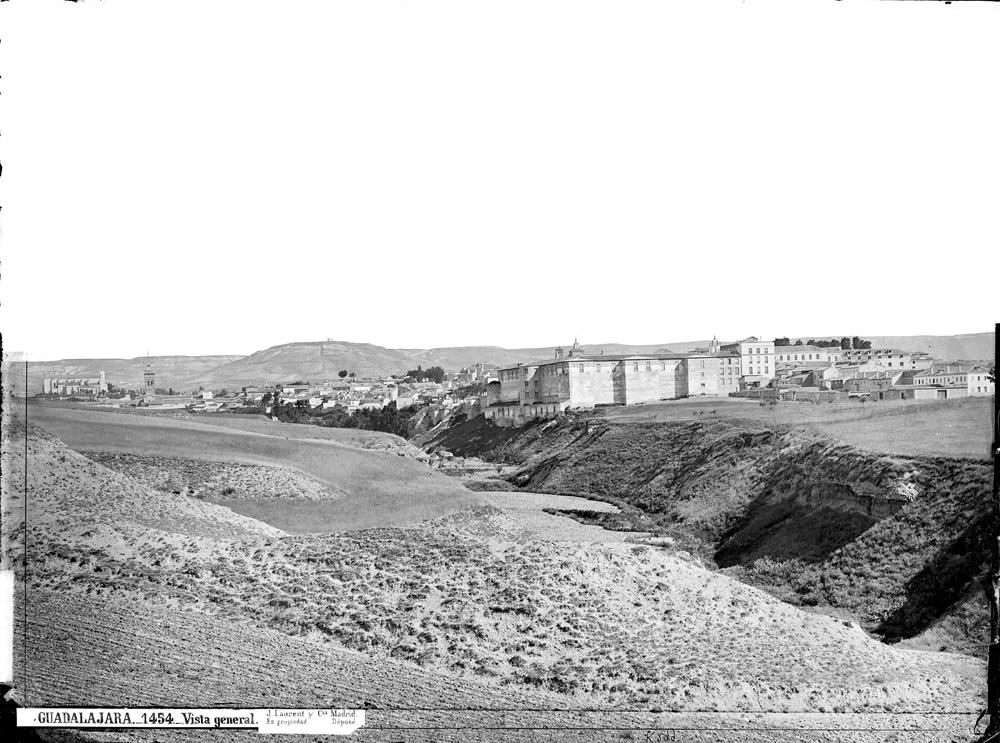
Guadalajara circa 1872, by Laurent.

The 19th century started with two major setbacks: the damages caused by the Peninsular War (1808–1814) and the closing of the Real Fábrica de Paños in 1822. In 1808, Guadalajara was taken by the French Army led by General Hugo and the city was destroyed. During the war, the 14 convents in the city were abandoned and turned into barracks, paving the way for the future processes of desamortización, most decisively in between 1833 and 1843.

The desamortización entailed the change of use of religious buildings (turned to hospitals, high schools, military workshops), the demolition of some convents to widen street space and to erect new residential areas, and the reduction of the share of church properties in the estate structure.

Both the declaration of Guadalajara as provincial capital and the parallel installment of the Academy of Military Engineers in the city in 1833, fostered some slow growth.

Railway transport arrived to the city with the opening of the Madrid–Guadalajara stretch of the Madrid–Zaragoza line (built by the Compañía de los Ferrocarriles de Madrid a Zaragoza y Alicante, MZA) on 3 May 1859. Conversely, the Guadalajara–Jadraque stretch to the northeast was opened on 5 October 1860.

The municipality had a population of 12,662 in 1900, the most populated municipality in the province, followed by Sigüenza (10,581). The 20th century saw the construction of the current water supply system bringing the waters of the Sorbe to the city.

On 21 July 1936, following the general coup d'état of 18 July that sparked the Spanish Civil War (1936–1939), the conspiring officers in the city (joined by the forces of public order and some civilians, amounting to an overall force of roughly 800) seized control of the city. The next day, the Republican Government in Madrid sent Ildefonso Puigdendolas to quell the rebellion and secure the city. The rebels were pushed in retreat to the Cuartel de Aerostación, where they surrendered. The militias executed roughly one hundred of them.

The city was the target of several aerial bombing attacks by the Francoists; the most famous, in December 1936, struck the Palacio del Infantado.

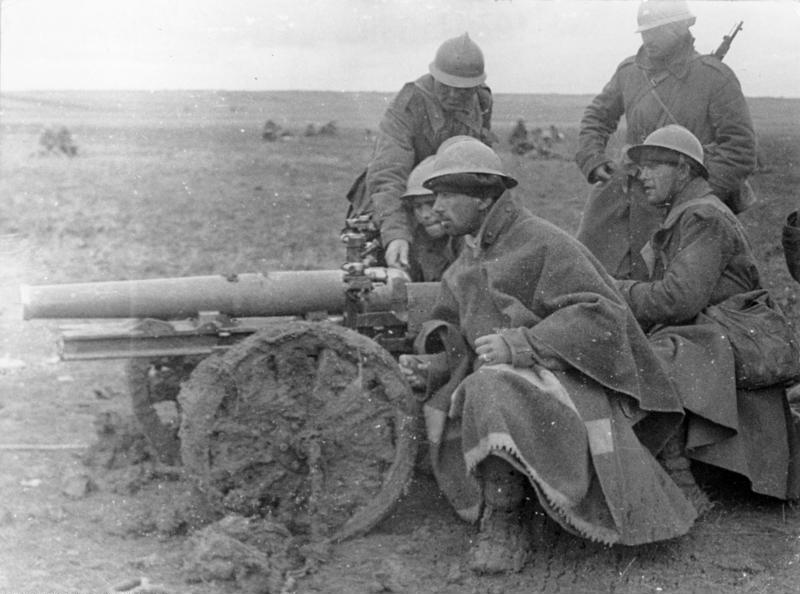
Soldiers of the Rebel faction during the Battle of Guadalajara (1937).

On 8 March 1937, the four divisions of the Italian Corpo Truppe Volontarie (CTV), attacked Republican positions 16 kilometres (10 mi) outside Guadalajara as a supporting diversionary attack supporting the Nationalist Jarama Offensive began at the beginning of February. After four days of a slow, cautious advance during rainy weather, the tanks started attacking along paved roads and outran the air and anti-aircraft artillery support. Shortly thereafter, Republican airplanes in newly clear skies found the tanks and infantry in a traffic jam on the main road into Guadalajara. The Republican aircraft attacked and destroyed all the vehicles in the mechanized spearhead. The CTV retreated with casualties in the thousands. Ernest Hemingway labeled the attack "Italian débâcle at Guadalajara." As a result of the victory, Republican forces enjoyed an increase in recruitment.

This defeat at Guadalajara had two long-standing effects. First, the Italian Army of the Mussolini dictatorship acquired a reputation for incompetence that lasted until the armistice of 1943. Second, some observing nations adopted a doctrine that ruled out tanks operating as an independent force but emphasized tying them tightly to large infantry formations.

The Civil War and the heavy fighting around the city caused significant damage. After two decades of slow rebuilding, Guadalajara was included in 1959 in the development plans for alleviating the congestion of Madrid's industrial estates (El Plan de Descongestión Industrial de Madrid en Castilla-La Mancha). These plans attempted to move industrial and accompanying residential growth to the periphery, including in Guadalajara. Since then, Guadalajara has been one of the fast-growing Spanish cities.

Guadalajara absorbed the municipalities of Taracena, Valdenoches and Iriépal in 1969, Marchamalo in 1972 and Usanos in 1973. Later, in 1999, Marchamalo segregated from Guadalajara, becoming a standalone municipality again.

Nowadays, Guadalajara is involved in urban development plans that are quickly increasing the population of the city. New districts like Aguas Vivas (Live Waters) have been inaugurated.

Ciudad Valdeluz was planned to increase the number of inhabitants of Guadalajara by 30,000, creating a new city around the AVE Station (Spanish High-Speed Trains). The company investing in the construction of Ciudad Valdeluz went bankrupt. Fewer than 500 inhabitants decided to occupy their flats and the remaining infrastructure is slow degrading. The AVE trains are used by only 60 passengers a day.

== Geography ==
=== Location ===
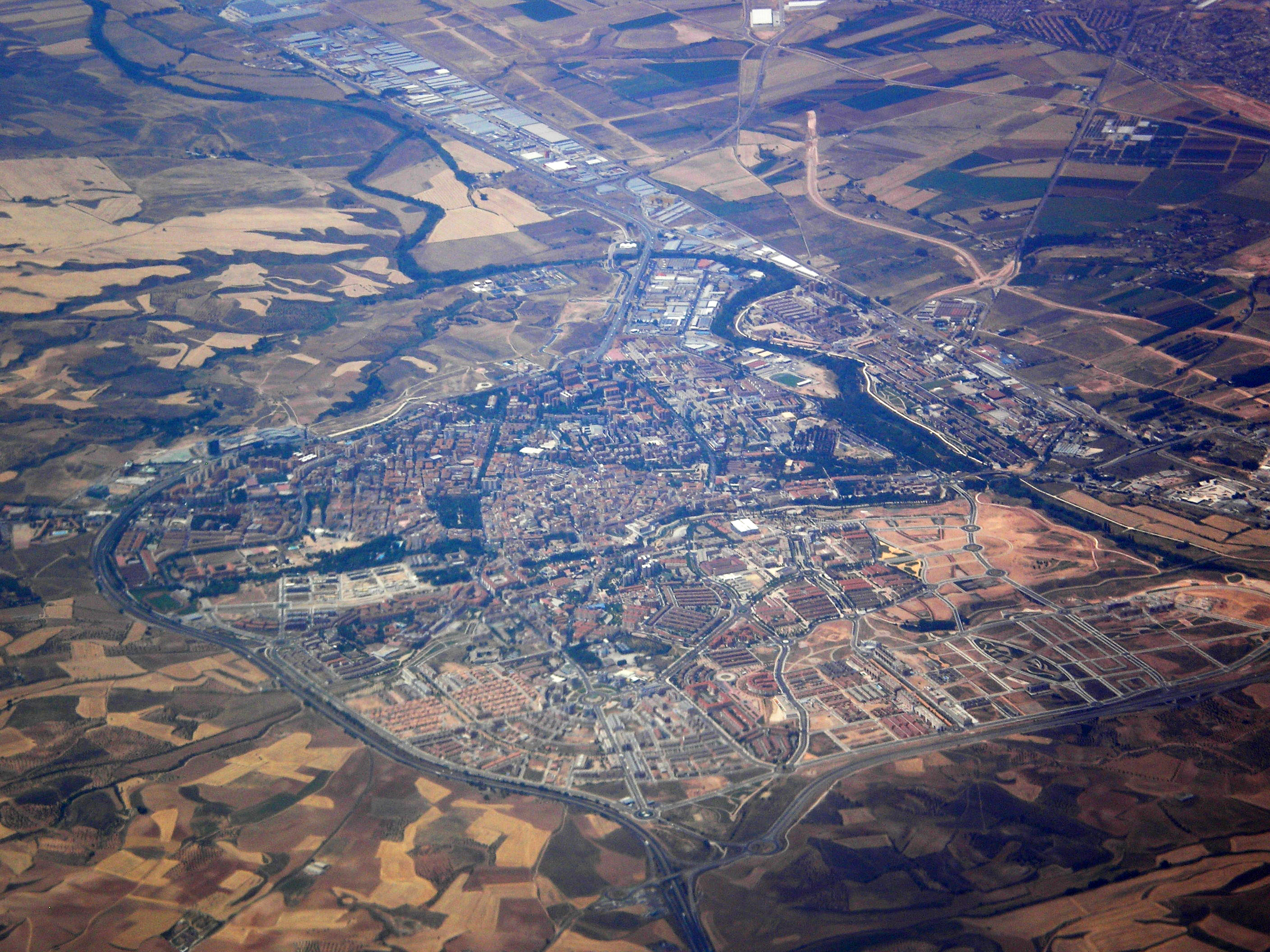
Aerial view of the city, as seen from the northeast.

Guadalajara is located in the central part of the Iberian Peninsula, in the southern half of the Inner Plateau.

Chosen as settlement on the basis of defensive purposes, the historic urban core of the city lies on a small elevation near the left-bank of the Henares River, also enclosed to the East and West by two small ditches corresponding to two watercourses, Alamín and San Antonio, respectively, forming a narrow and easily defendable space upon their confluence with the Henares.

The municipality spans across a total area of 235.49 km^{2}.

=== Climate ===
Guadalajara enjoys a cold semi-arid climate (Köppen climate classification: BSk) bordering on a mediterranean climate (Köppen: Csa) with continental influences for being well inland at 700 meters above sea level. Summers are hot with relatively cool nights, while winters are cool with cold nights. The lowest temperature ever recorded in Guadalajara is −12.5 °C (9.5 °F) on 12 January 2009. The highest temperature ever recorded is 43.5 °C (110.3 °F) on 10 August 2012.

Climate data for Guadalajara, El Serranillo, 639 m (1991-2015) 40°39′33″N 3°10′24″W, extremes (1985-2015)
Month	Jan	Feb	Mar	Apr	May	Jun	Jul	Aug	Sep	Oct	Nov	Dec	Year
Record high °C (°F)	20.7 (69.3)	22.4 (72.3)	28.2 (82.8)	30.9 (87.6)	37.2 (99.0)	40.4 (104.7)	41.0 (105.8)	43.5 (110.3)	39.8 (103.6)	31.6 (88.9)	25.4 (77.7)	20.0 (68.0)	43.5 (110.3)
Mean daily maximum °C (°F)	10.8 (51.4)	12.6 (54.7)	16.9 (62.4)	19.0 (66.2)	23.8 (74.8)	30.3 (86.5)	33.9 (93.0)	33.1 (91.6)	27.3 (81.1)	21.1 (70.0)	14.8 (58.6)	11.1 (52.0)	21.2 (70.2)
Daily mean °C (°F)	4.9 (40.8)	5.9 (42.6)	9.4 (48.9)	11.5 (52.7)	15.7 (60.3)	21.1 (70.0)	24.0 (75.2)	23.3 (73.9)	18.7 (65.7)	14.1 (57.4)	8.7 (47.7)	5.4 (41.7)	13.6 (56.4)
Mean daily minimum °C (°F)	−1 (30)	−0.8 (30.6)	1.8 (35.2)	4.0 (39.2)	7.6 (45.7)	11.7 (53.1)	14.0 (57.2)	13.5 (56.3)	10.0 (50.0)	7.0 (44.6)	2.5 (36.5)	−0.4 (31.3)	5.8 (42.5)
Record low °C (°F)	−12.5 (9.5)	−12.0 (10.4)	−7.9 (17.8)	−5.0 (23.0)	−2.6 (27.3)	1.2 (34.2)	5.5 (41.9)	5.0 (41.0)	−1.0 (30.2)	−4.4 (24.1)	−10.5 (13.1)	−11.7 (10.9)	−12.5 (9.5)
Average precipitation mm (inches)	33 (1.3)	28 (1.1)	26 (1.0)	45 (1.8)	52 (2.0)	23 (0.9)	7 (0.3)	7 (0.3)	26 (1.0)	69 (2.7)	46 (1.8)	42 (1.7)	404 (15.9)
Average precipitation days (≥ 1 mm)	6.1	5.1	4.7	7.2	7.0	3.5	1.3	1.1	4.0	7.9	6.2	5.7	59.8
Average snowy days	0.8	0.9	0.3	0.2	0.0	0.0	0.0	0.0	0.0	0.0	0.1	0.6	2.9
Source: Agencia Estatal de Meteorología

== Politics and administration ==
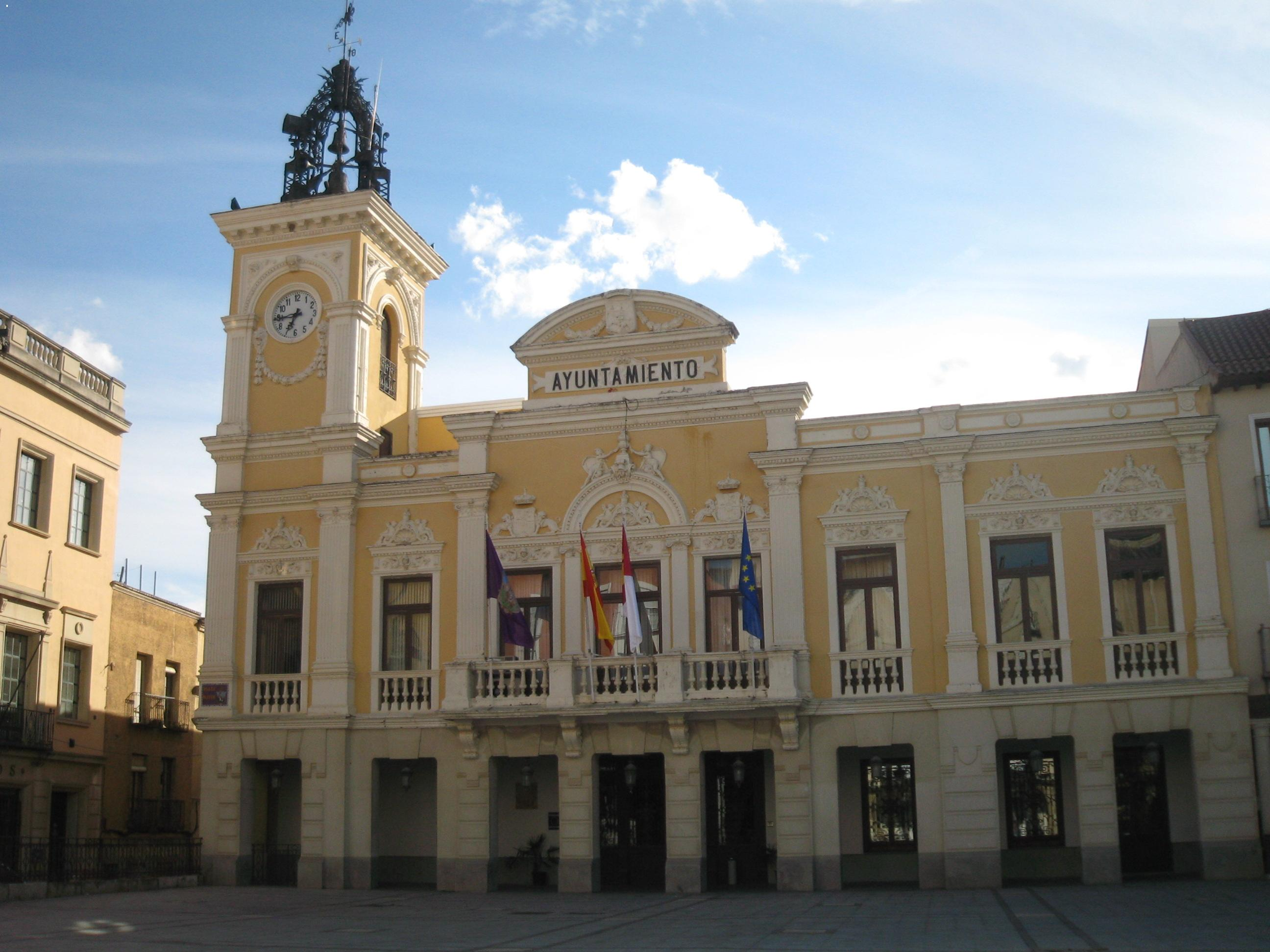
Guadalajara City Hall.

Guadalajara is a municipality, the basic level of local division in Spain. The Ayuntamiento is the body charged with the municipal government and administration. The Plenary of the ayuntamiento is formed by 25 elected municipal councillors, who in turn invest the mayor. The last municipal election took place on 28 May 2023. Since June 2023, the current mayor is Ana Guarinos López (People's Party).

== Demographics ==
=== Urban area ===
The 2020 report on urban areas in Spain published by the Ministry of Transports, Mobility and Urban Agenda identifies an urban area formed by the municipality of Guadalajara together with the neighbouring municipalities of Azuqueca de Henares, Alovera, Cabanillas del Campo, Marchamalo, Villanueva de la Torre and Chiloeches, with a population of 161,683 (2019).

== Architecture ==
City proper

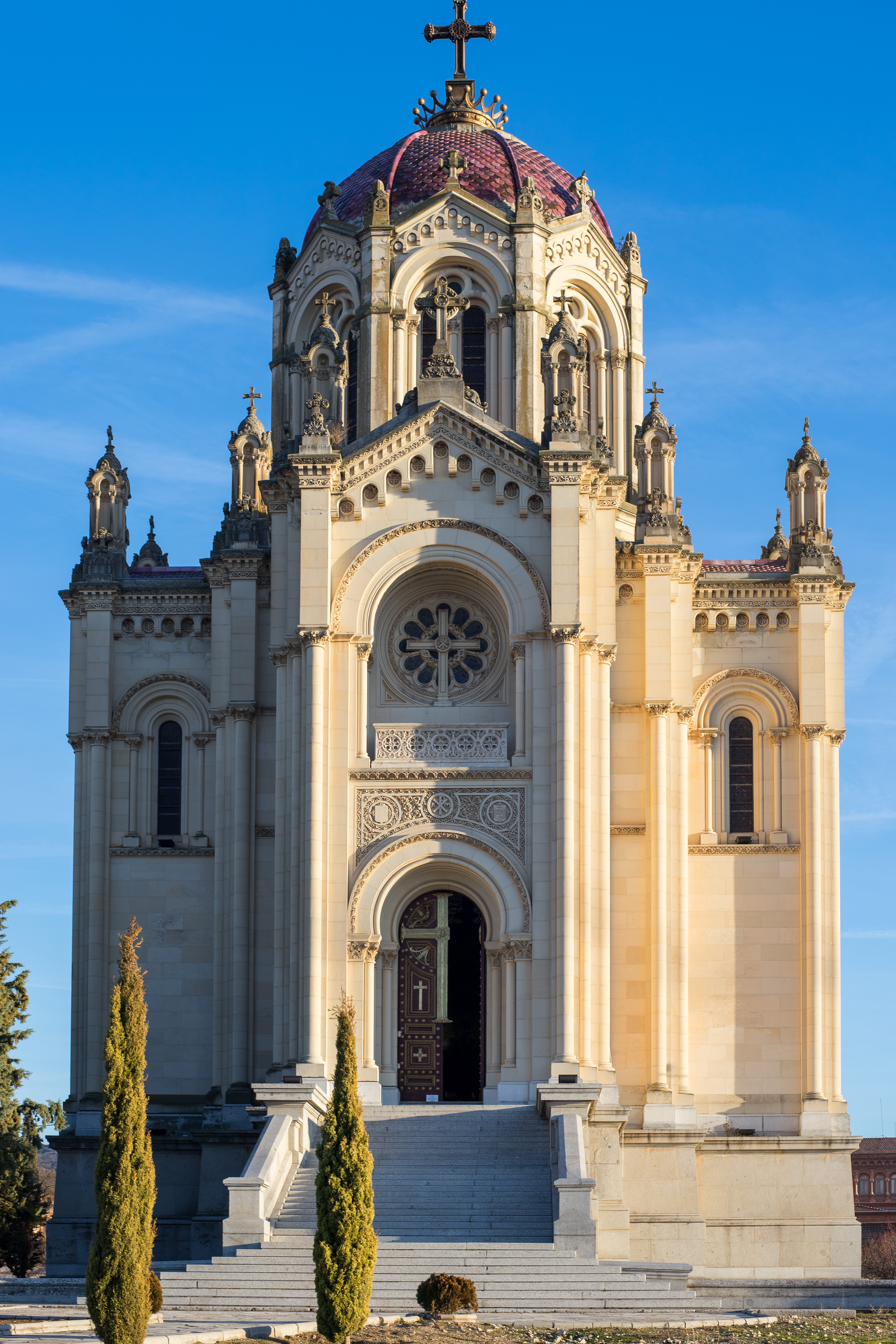
Panteón de la Duquesa de Sevillano.

The bridge across the Henares river is Arab but built on Roman foundations. It has several historic buildings such as the Palacio del Infantado, as well as many churches, such as the church of San Ginés. Although Guadalajara is the biggest city in its diocese, the cathedral is located in the nearby town of Sigüenza. However, in Guadalajara, there is a "co-cathedral", the church of Saint Mary, in Mudejar style. Very close to this church, is placed the chapel known as "Capilla de Luis de Lucena", which has several fresco paintings on its walls and ceiling. The Church of los Remedios was declared Bien de Interés Cultural in 1924, and currently serves as the auditorium of the University of Alcalá. The Church of la Piedad was declared Bien de Interés Cultural in 1931.

Before the Civil War, Guadalajara was also known to be among the cities with most number of antique azulejos in the Iberian Peninsula housed in their buildings, since the city housed the largest collection of azulejos from Talavera de la Reina pottery; now almost all of those azulejos are lost.

Pedanías

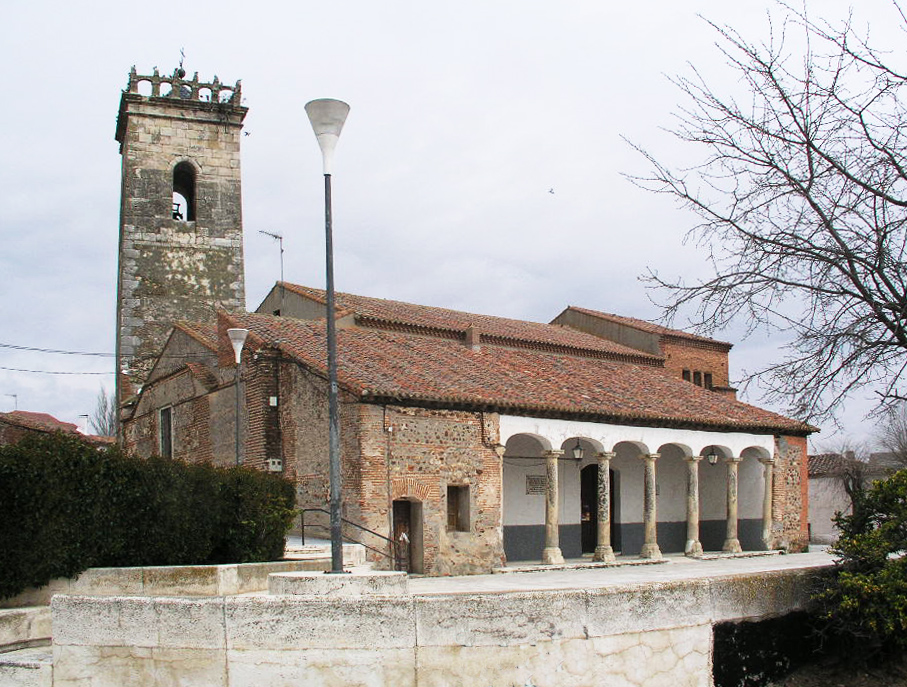
Church of Asunción in Usanos example of religious and Romanesque architecture in Guadalajara.

The small villages (pedanías) of Iriépal, Taracena, Usanos, and Valdenoches that belong to the municipality feature few monumental landmarks other than their humble rural churches. Thus, in Iriépal there is the Concepción church, constructed in the 16th century, which is known for its Mudéjar tower. In Taracena there is the 17th century Church of the Immaculate, in a very simple Renaissance style. In Usanos, there is the 13th-century Romanesque church of the Assumption, considerably remodeled in later periods and which features a crenelated tower.

Other types of monuments that are also noteworthy are the Iriépal laundry, work of 1910 in historicist style with funding from the Jose Santa María de Hita Foundation, and Iriépal (1858) and Valdenoches (1656) funds.

Throughout all the villages there are examples of Castilian mansions, quite modest compared to those in the cities. Of note also is Villaflores, a farming village built in 1887, designed by Ricardo Velázquez Bosco and commissioned to Maria Diega Desmaissières.

== Transport ==
Guadalajara is served by two railway stations:

- Guadalajara railway station, located in the city centre and part of the classical railway lines, e.g., connecting Chamartín to Portbou/Cerbère.
- Guadalajara–Yebes railway station, located 5.6 kilometres (3.5 mi) at the South-East of Guadalajara, on the Madrid–Barcelona high-speed rail line.

== Sports ==
The local men's football team, CD Guadalajara, currently play at the Tercera División, the fourth tier of the Spanish football system. Their home pitch is the Pedro Escartín. The BM Guadalajara play at the ASOBAL league, the top tier of the men's handball system in Spain. Their home fixtures are played at the Palacio Multiusos de Guadalajara. Guadalajara was one of the host cities of the 2013 World Men's Handball Championship.

== International relations ==
Twin towns and sister cities

Guadalajara is twinned with:

- Livorno, Italy (since 1979)
- Roanne, France (since 1980)
- Guadalajara, Mexico (since 1982)
- Nuneaton, United Kingdom (since 1990)
- Guadalajara de Buga, Colombia (since 1996)

Other city partnerships

- Nowy Sącz, Poland (since 2015)

== Notable people ==
Distinguished people from or related to the town were:

- Álvar Fáñez de Minaya (fl. 1076–1114), alleged Christian conqueror of Guadalajara, represented on the city's coat of arms.
- Nuño Beltrán de Guzmán (c. 1490–1558), founder of Guadalajara, Mexico
- Isabel Muñoz-Caravaca (1838–1915), teacher, writer and labour activist.
- Francisco Fernández Iparraguirre (1852–1889), pharmacist, linguist and botanist.
- María Diega Desmaissières y Sevillano (1852–1916), Countess of Vega del Pozo and Duchess of Sevillano.
- Jose de Creeft (1884–1982), famous sculptor born in Guadalajara.
- José Ortiz-Echagüe (1886–1980), military engineer and photographer, honorary lifetime president of SEAT and founder of CASA.
- Antonio Buero Vallejo (1916–2000), 20th-century writer.

== See also ==
- Monument to Romanones (Guadalajara)
- Museum of Guadalajara
