= Azuqueca de Henares =

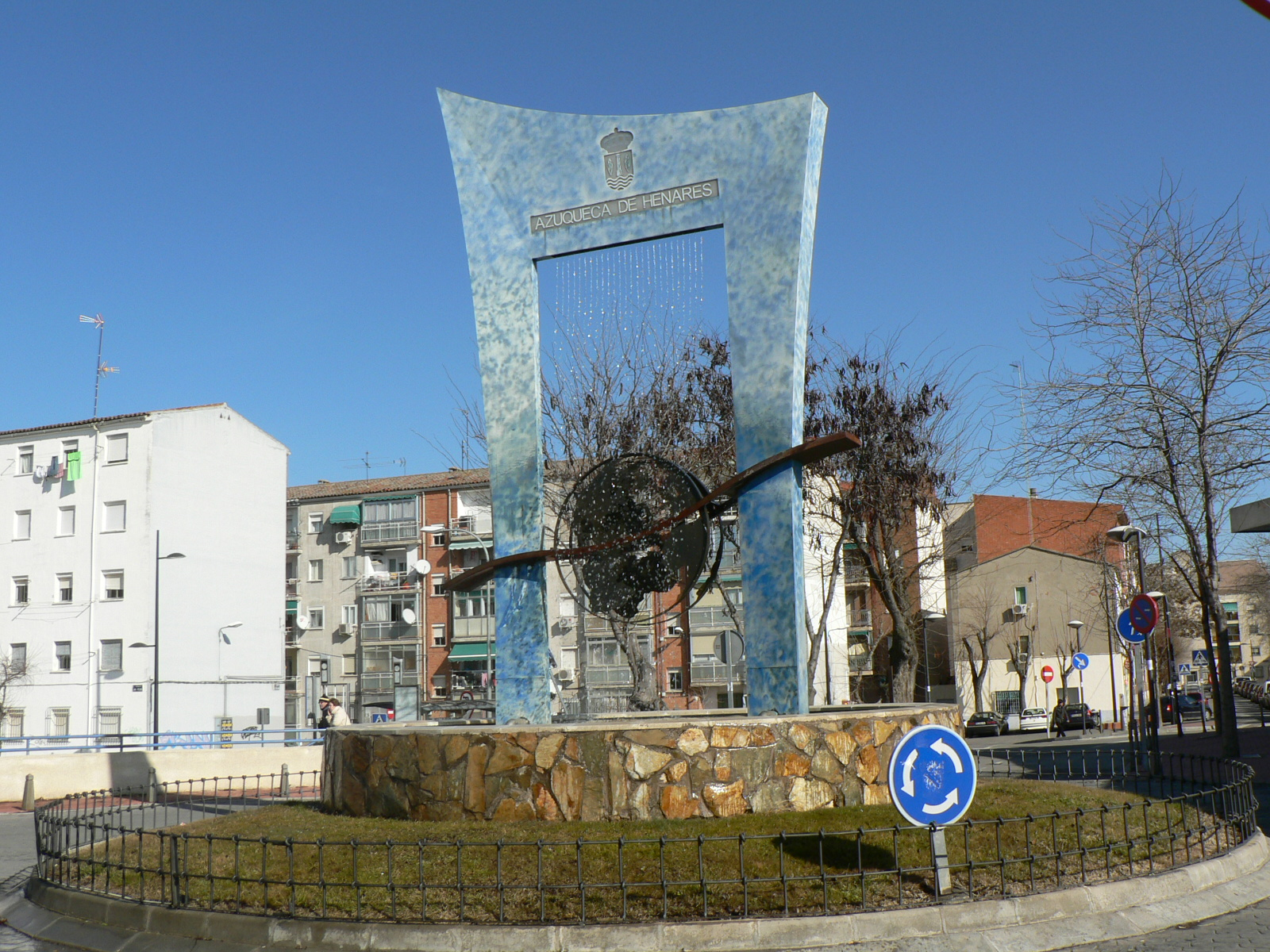

- Coat of arms

- Location within Province of Guadalajara Location within Castilla-La Mancha Location within Spain
- Coordinates: 40°33′53″N 3°16′05″W
- Country: Spain
- Autonomous community: Castile-La Mancha
- Province: Guadalajara
- Municipality: Azuqueca de Henares

Area
  - Total: 19.68 km^{2} (7.60 sq mi)
- Elevation: 627 m (2,057 ft)

Population (2025-01-01)
  - Total: 35,924
  - Density: 1,825/km^{2} (4,728/sq mi)
- Time zone: UTC+1 (CET)
  - Summer (DST): UTC+2 (CEST)
- Postal code: 19200
- Dialing code: 949

Azuqueca de Henares is a municipality located in the province of Guadalajara, Castile-La Mancha, Spain. According to the 2013 census (INE), the municipality had a population of 34,685 inhabitants. The mayor of Azuqueca is José Luis Blanco.

== History of Azuqueca ==
The name Azuqueca has its origin in the Arabic language and means lane because Azuqueca was a little village situated in a Roman road between Mérida and Zaragoza. In II A.C., Azuqueca was a Roman village, near the river Henares. The population wasn't very big and it was a village dedicated to agriculture. In the Middle Ages, it was a refuge for the traders when it was under Arabic control, but, after the Christian reconquest, by the king Alfonso VI. After a few years, Azuqueca became part of Guadalajara. In 1628 the Salinas del Río Pisuegra’s marquises bought the village to the king Philip IV of Spain. The following centuries, Azuqueca still being a village with no more than 300 inhabitants, but in the 20th century, with the influence of Madrid’s industrial development, and the National Plan of Economic Stabilization, Azuqueca became a small industrial city: Nowadays, the agriculture isn’t the principal economical activity and the service’s section will continue to develop during the next century.

== Education ==
Six public primary schools and one private school are located in Azuqueca de Henares:

- Virgen de la Soledad
- Maestra placida Herranz
- La paz
- Siglo XXI
- Giovanni Farina (private and also is a high school)
- La Paloma.
- La espiga.

There are further three public high schools in Azuqueca de Henares:

- Professor Dominguez Ortiz.
- Arcipreste de Hita.
- San Isidro.

Another education centers are:

- Aula Apícola Municipal de Azuqueca de Henares, Guadalajara, Spain Aula Apícola Municipal

In addition, there is an adults education center, an apiculture's room and a natural's room too. There is no university in Azuqueca but in several cities close: Alcalá de Henares, Guadalajara and Madrid.

== Transport ==
Azuqueca is a logistic center due to its position near the capital city of Spain, Madrid, and the highway Zaragoza- Madrid that connects these cities. Azuqueca is linked by conventional railway line Madrid-Barcelona and the line C-2 in suburban Madrid, which usually stops at the station in the town. The third major line of communication of the town is Highway Toll Radial 2. Azuqueca is connected by road, which circulate both cars and buses line Alovera, Quer, Villanueva de la Torre, Torrejón del Rey and the northern region of the countryside, Meco, Chiloeches and Baja Alcarria.

== Health ==
There are two health centers which serves the entire town. In 2007 opened a specialty center for diagnosis and treatment of Azuqueca. Near the town there are also hospitals of in Alcalá de Henares and Guadalajara, Castile-La Mancha.

== Leisure and culture ==
=== Monuments ===
Not many monuments from the past remained in Azuqueca, no civil monuments can nowadays be found in the city. The structure of Azuqueca is quite simple: A church in the center of the village and some hermitages around it. There may other churches in Azuqueca such as the San Miguel's church and the Santa Teresa de Jesús' church. There are some hermitages too. In 1984 opened a huge house of the culture with a library, an exhibition hall, an auditorium etc.

=== Parks and Gardens ===
Azuqueca has many green areas. The biggest one is the Quebradilla's park, with 7 ha where the village festivals are celebrated. Other green areas or parks are the Hermitage's park, the Constitution's park, Vallehermoso's park and several more. Four big ponds are close to the river Henares. The river has got a protected space for flora and fauna and a size of 12 ha.

=== Sports ===
Azuqueca has four sport centers. The San Miguel's sport center has football fields, running tracks, a pediment, the summer's municipal swimming pool etc.

=== Festivities ===
The principal festivities of the town are held on the third Sunday in September, and have the collaboration of the peñas. The highlight of these celebration is the parade of floats that have been declared tourist interest regional. May 15 celebration are held in honor of patron San Isidro farmer, but are less busy than September.
