= Sorbe =

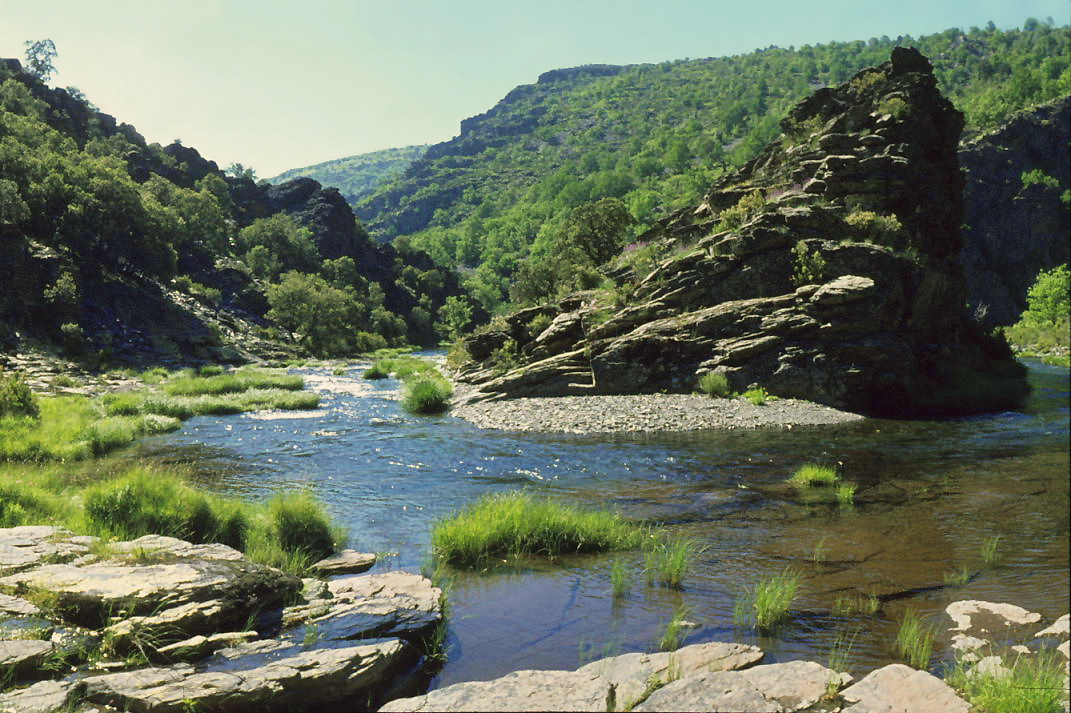
- The Sorbe near Cantalojas

Location
- Country: Spain

Physical characteristics
- Source: Sistema Central
  - location: Galve de Sorbe
  - coordinates: 41°14′5″N 3°12′14″W
  - elevation: ~1,310 m (4,300 ft)
- Mouth: Henares
  - location: Humanes
  - coordinates: 40°51′2″N 3°7′44″W
  - elevation: 700 m (2,300 ft)
- Length: 79.5 km (49.4 mi)
- Basin size: 546 km^{2} (211 sq mi)

Basin features
- Progression: Henares→ Jarama→ Tagus→ Atlantic Ocean
- River system: Tagus
- Tributaries
  - right: Lillas, Sonsaz

The Sorbe is a right-bank tributary of the Henares, located in the centre of the Iberian Peninsula. It forms part of the Tagus river basin.

It has its source in the easternmost foothills of the Sistema Central at roughly 1,310 m above sea level, formed upon the confluence of smaller streams, although it feeds downstream from right-bank tributaries born at a higher altitude, namely: the Lillas and the Sonsaz. It has a length of 79.5 km. Running southwards through the Spanish province of Guadalajara, it empties in the Henares at 700 m above sea level, near Humanes.

It drains a basin of 546 km.^{2}.
