= Galve =

Galve can refer to:

- Lake Galvė in Lithuania
- Galve, Teruel, a town in Teruel, Spain
- Galve de Sorbe, a town in Guadalajara, Spain
