= Isabel Muñoz-Caravaca =

Spanish journalist (1848–1915)

Isabel Munoz-Caravaca
- Born: Isabel de Alcázar; 3 August 1838; Madrid
- Died: 28 March 1915 (aged 76); Guadalajara
- Occupations: Teacher journalist Astronomer; Labour activist Ecologist; Feminist
- Years active: 1895–1915

Isabel Muñoz-Caravaca (born 3 August 1838, Madrid — d. 28 March 1915, Guadalajara) was a Spanish teacher, journalist, astronomer, labor activist, ecologist, and feminist active in Guadalajara until 1910.

== Life and work ==
Isabel Muñoz-Caravaca was born to an aristocratic parents Francisco and Alejandra de Alcázar in Madrid, Spain on 3 August 1838 and did not live a happy childhood by her recollection. She studied in Madrid and in Paris, receiving tutoring in music and the French language at the Madrid Royal Conservatory with Manuel de la Mata. On 7 December 1874, she married Ambrosio Moya de la Torre y Ojeda, a professor at the Complutense University of Madrid who was 26 years her senior. She had three children and lived a comfortable life until her husband died in January 1895, leaving her a widow. She then broke convention by entering the Atienza Girls' School, where she soon found pedagogical work at the age of 47. Her teaching was not limited to the Girls' School; she began to hold a night school to teach adult workers at the same time she was preparing schoolgirls to enter the normal school in Guadalajara. She stayed in Atienza until her oldest son Jorge became an assistant to the provincial board of education in 1910.

From 1898 to 1899, Muñoz-Caravaca began her journalistic activities in Guadalajara by writing about local history for the paper Atienza Illustrated and became a regular contributor to the publication Flores y Abejas (Flowers and Bees) from 1900 to 1914. In 1899, she published the Principles of Arithmetic in Madrid, a text based on her teaching of mathematics in Atienza that came complete with exercises, questions and tables. At the beginning of the 20th century, she also published in Madrid the Elements of the Solfeggio Theory, a book that facilitated the teaching of music. Muñoz-Caravaca published numerous articles in the left-leaning weekly publication La Alcarria Obrera; it is possible that she wrote under the pseudonym El Republicano between 1902 and 1905.

Muñoz-Caravaca resigned from her teaching position in 1902 in the face of resistance from local government and ecclesiastical entities (she often refused to work with teachers' associations), though she promoted the construction of a new school in Atienza, which closed in 1916. A budding astronomer, she installed a telescope in her home and traveled in August 1905 to Almazán with the Société astronomique de France to observe the eclipse. This scientific was criticized by Madrid magazine Gideon, prompting angry response from Muñoz-Caravaca through Flores y Abejas.

In 1914, Muñoz-Caravaca became ill with cancer, and she died of it in the dawn of 28 March 1915.
