= Monument to Romanones (Guadalajara, Spain) =

Monument in Guadalajara

Romanones
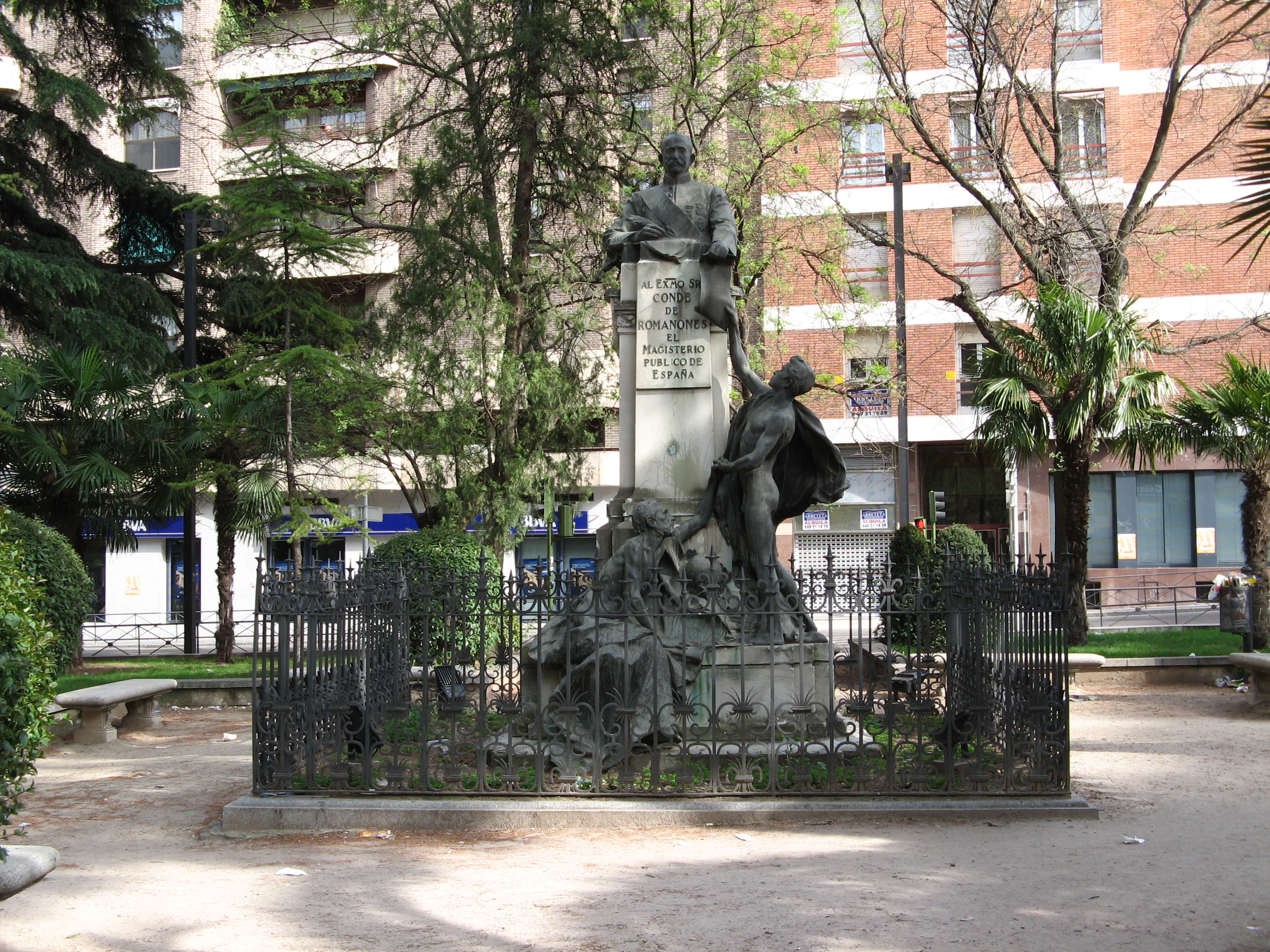
- Interactive map of Romanones
- Location: Plaza de Santo Domingo, Guadalajara, Spain
- Coordinates: 40.630665°N 3.164493°W
- Designer: Miquel Blay
- Material: Bronze, stone
- Opening date: 16 October 1913
- Dedicated to: Count of Romanones

The Monument to Romanones is an instance of public art in Guadalajara, Spain. Designed by Miquel Blay, it consists of a bronze bust of Álvaro Figueroa Torres put on top of a pedestal, with other sculptural items around.

== History and description ==
The monument was an initiative of the teachers' associations in the province of Guadalajara, in appreciation for the 1901 Royal Decree promoted by Romanones which made possible the inclusion of the teachers' salaries and other expenses within the State's budget. The design was awarded to Miquel Blay.

The monument was unveiled on 16 October 1913, during a ceremony in which Joaquín Ruiz Jiménez (Minister of Public Instruction), the Mayor of Guadalajara and Eduardo Vincenti (Mayor of Madrid), intervened as speakers, also attended by the likes of Ángel Galarza (Director of the Geographic Institute) and Fernando Weyler (Under-Secretary of Public Instruction).

It was erected when Romanones was still alive, in Guadalajara, the electoral district where Romanones had built his strongest political client networks.

Besides the bronze bust of Romanones topping off the monument, the sculptural ensemble also displays a teacher (Wisdom) and a student (Learning). The latter is depicted collecting the 1901 royal decree from the hands of Romanones.

When commented about the inauguration, Romanones (serving as prime minister at the time) reportedly threatened with removing his statue stating as follows: "Well then, I will go there with my guards one morning and I will remove it. I think the effigy already belongs to me, just as a photograph belongs to the person being photographed".

The monument underwent a restoration in 2013, consisting of its cleaning as well as the sealing of cracks and holes in the bronze pieces.
