= Church of la Piedad (Guadalajara) =

- Iglesia de la Piedad (Guadalajara) (Spanish)
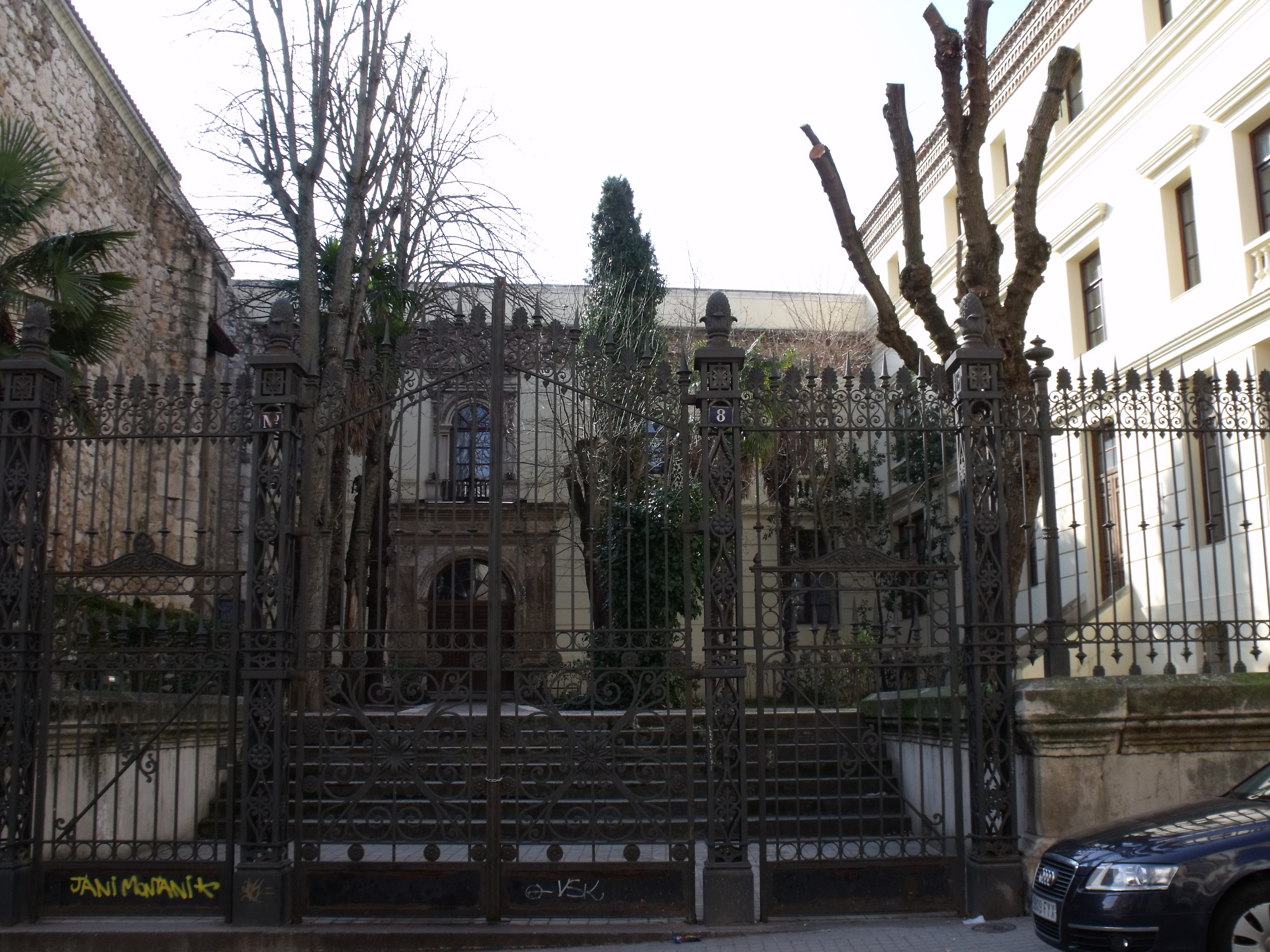

- Location within Spain
- 40.63524°N 3.166703°W
- Location: Guadalajara, Spain

Spanish Cultural Heritage
- Official name: Iglesia de la Piedad (Guadalajara)
- Type: Non-movable
- Criteria: Monument
- Designated: 1931
- Reference no.: RI-51-0000606

The Church of la Piedad (Spanish: Iglesia de la Piedad (Guadalajara)) is a church located in Guadalajara, Spain. It was declared Bien de Interés Cultural in 1931.
