= Bridge of Henares (Guadalajara) =

10th-century bridge in Spain

- Puente del Henares (Spanish)
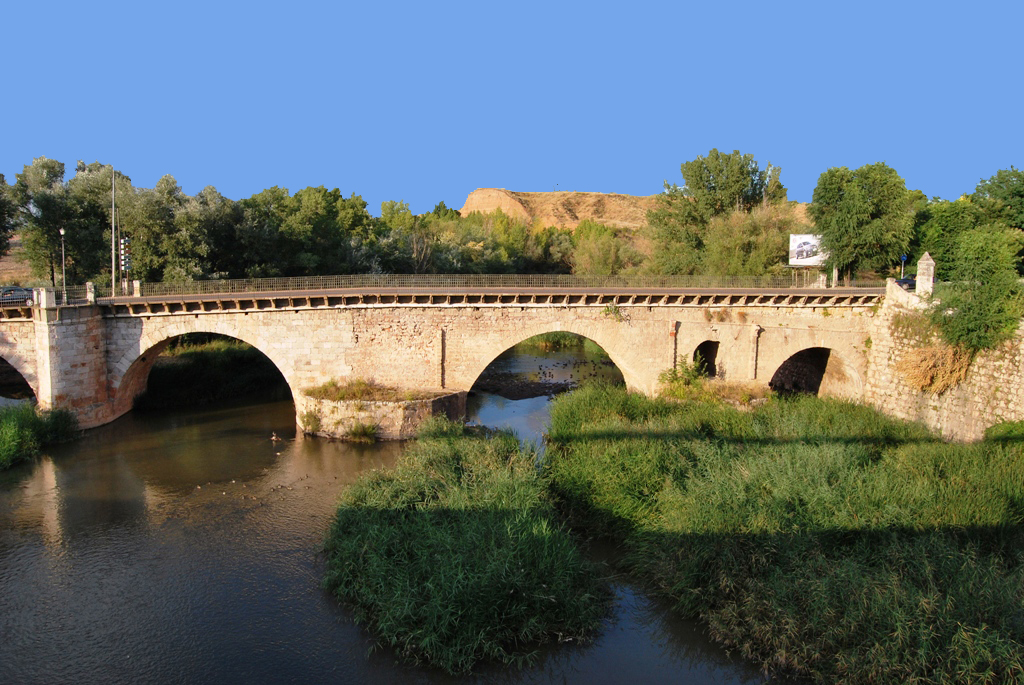

- Location within Spain
- 40.644533°N 3.173931°W
- Location: Guadalajara, Spain

History
- Built: romanesque

Site notes
- Area: guadalajara

Spanish Cultural Heritage
- Official name: Puente del Henares
- Type: Non-movable
- Criteria: Monument
- Designated: 1931
- Reference no.: RI-51-0000603

The Bridge of Henares (Spanish: Puente del Henares) is a bridge located in Guadalajara, Spain. The bridge was built in the 10th century but widened after the Reconquista. The bridge is 117 metres long. It was declared Bien de Interés Cultural in 1931.
