= Taracena =

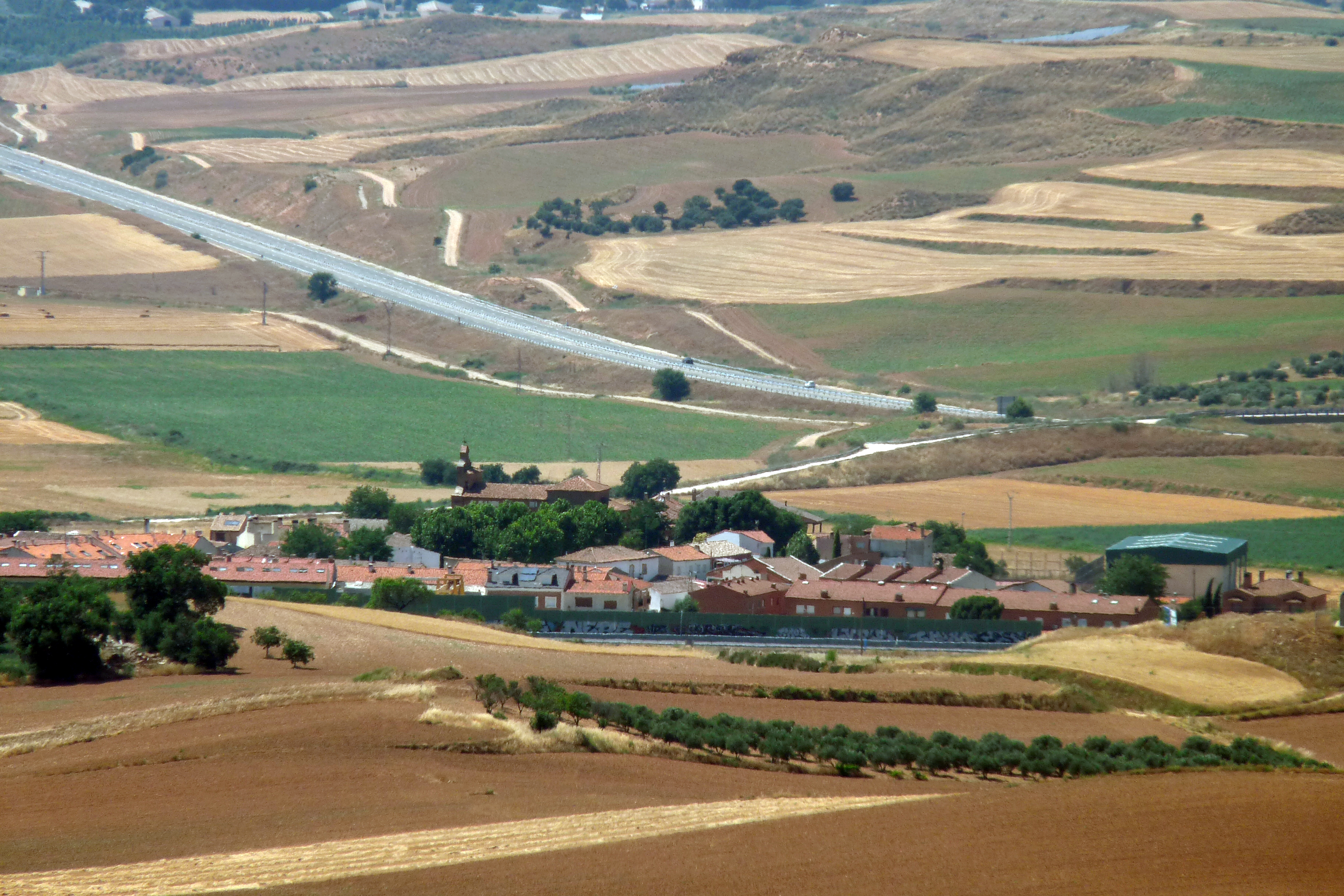
- Interactive map of Taracena
- Location in Spain Taracena (Spain)
- Coordinates: 40°39′14″N 3°07′37″W
- Country: Spain
- Autonomous community: Castilla–La Mancha
- Province: Guadalajara
- Municipality: Guadalajara

Taracena is a village (pedanía) belonging to the municipality of Guadalajara, Spain. It lies near the A-2.

== History ==
The area of Taracena has been often identified (including by Adolf Schulten) as the location of Caraca, the city besieged and subjugated by Quintus Sertorius in the 1st century BCE.

A former municipality, Taracena was absorbed by the provincial capital in 1969, together with Valdenoches and Iriépal.
