= Torote =

River in Spain

Coordinates: 40.4048°N 3.50107°W

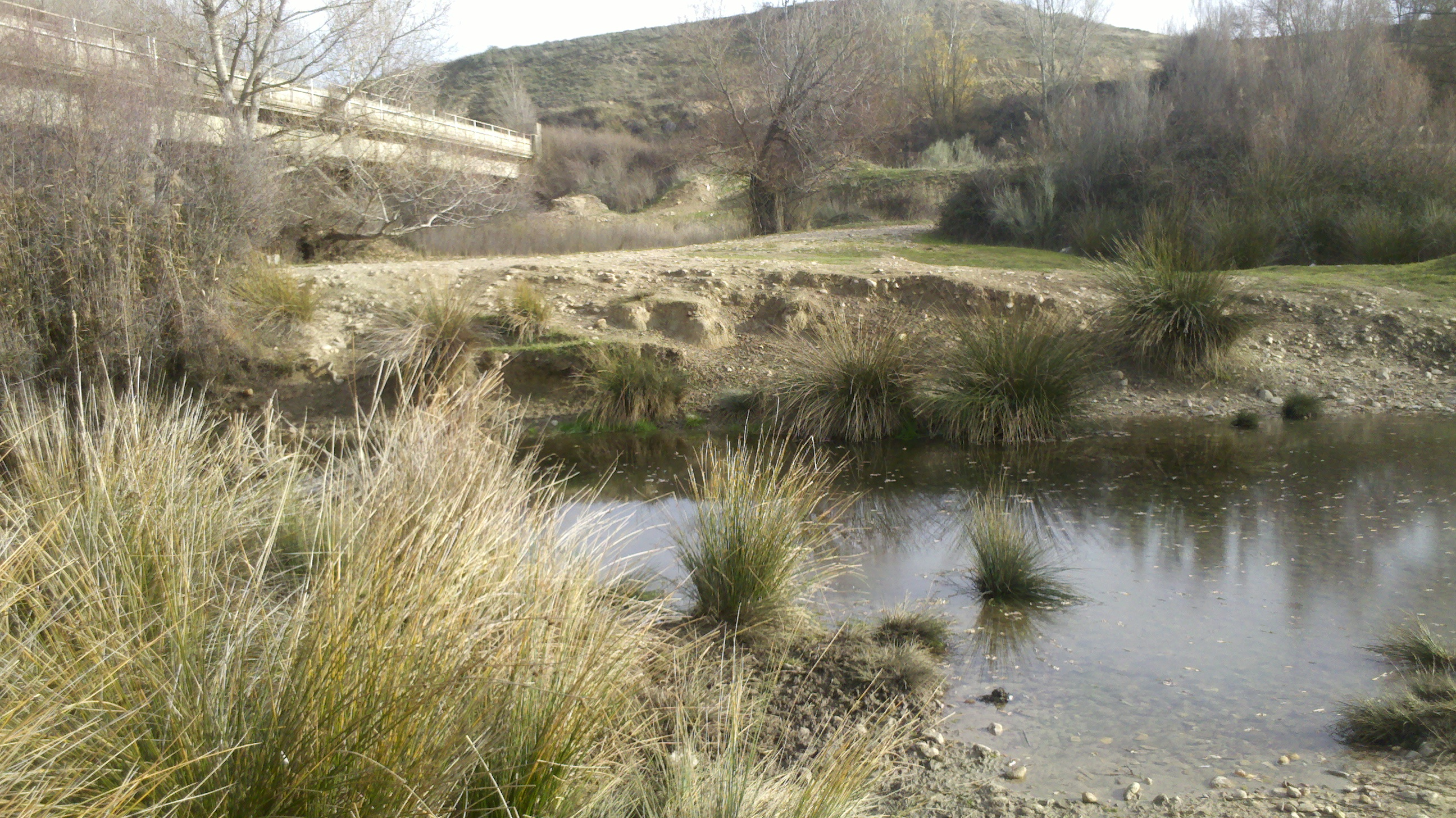
- Rio Torote close to N-320 bridge

Location
- Country: Spain

Physical characteristics
- Source
  - location: Cerro Picorroble
  - elevation: 956 m (3,136 ft)
- Mouth
  - location: Henares
  - elevation: 687 m (2,254 ft)
- Length: 43.85 km (27.25 mi)

Basin features
- Progression: Henares→ Jarama→ Tagus→ Atlantic Ocean

The Torote is a river in Spain, tributary of the Henares. It has its source close to Picorroble hill, in the province of Guadalajara.

== See also ==
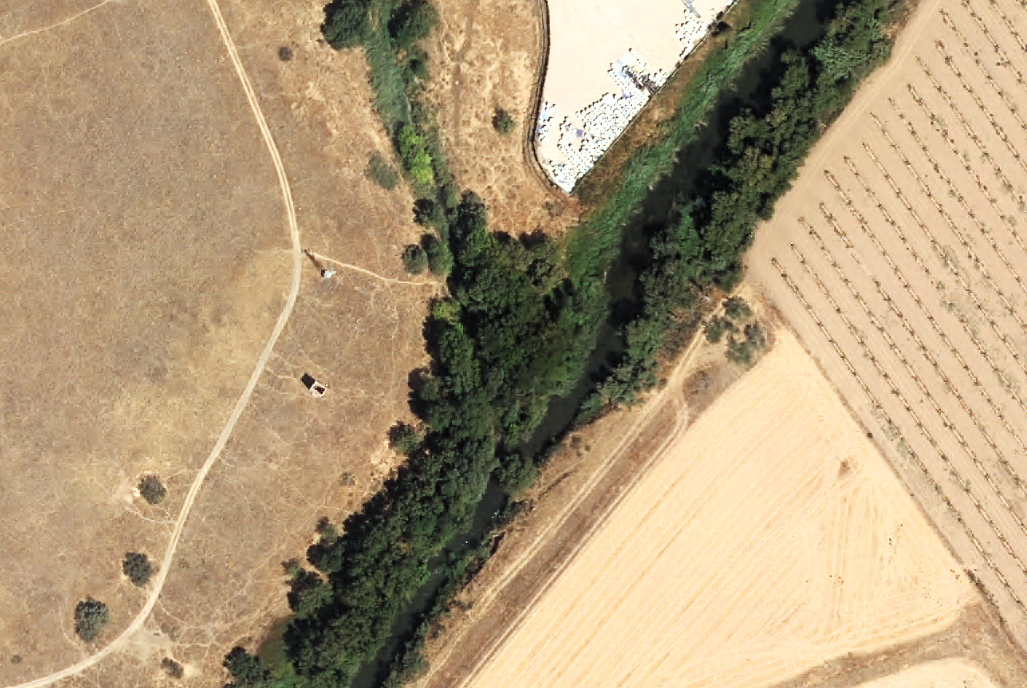
Mouth of the Torote river into the Henares river.

- List of rivers of Spain
