= María de Cazalla =

Spanish mystic

María de Cazalla (born 1487) was a Christian mystic in early modern Castile.

Born in Palma del Río, her family was of Jewish converso lineage (from which for whatever reason she disassociated herself). She was the sister of Juan de Cazalla, Cardinal Cisneros' secretary. She married an Old Christian with whom she had six children.

She was the subject of a long heresy trial by the Spanish Inquisition, lasting between 1532 and 1534.

When the process was opened against Toledo's lights, he was interrogated by the Inquisition in 1525 and entered prison in 1532. Her trial included accusations of lutheranism, erasmism and involvement with the alumbrados. It lasted until December 1534. She was subjected to the rack and water torture and was gagged part of the time of her captivity. She finally was acquitted of the most serious charges, subject to public shame in a church in Guadalajara and fined one hundred ducats, prohibited from keeping contact with her old relations.
