= Church of los Remedios (Guadalajara) =

- Iglesia de los Remedios (Spanish)
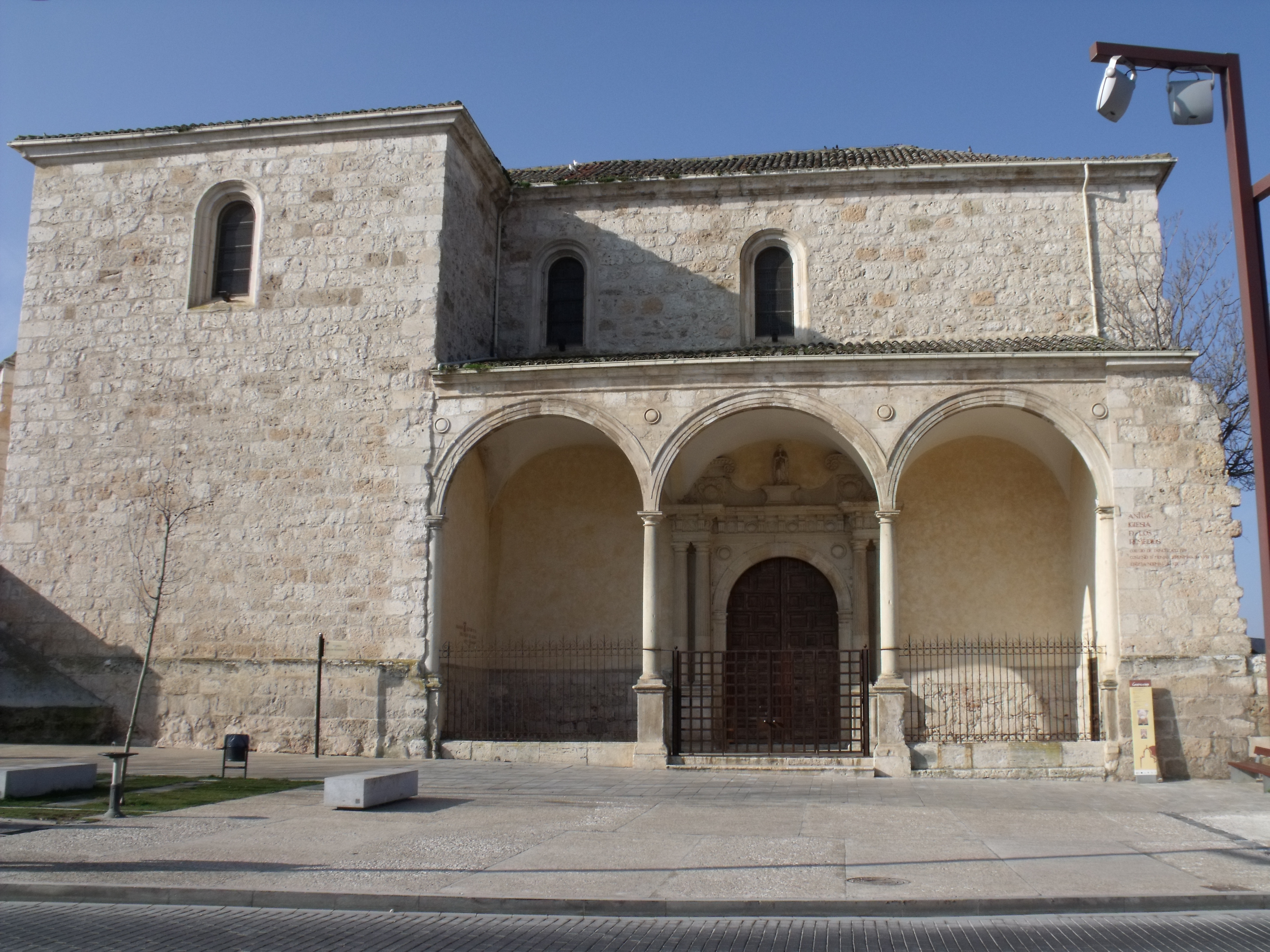

- Location within Spain
- 40.637142°N 3.169486°W
- Location: Guadalajara, Spain

Spanish Cultural Heritage
- Official name: Iglesia de los Remedios
- Type: Non-movable
- Criteria: Monument
- Designated: 1924
- Reference no.: RI-51-0000260

The Church of los Remedios (Spanish: Iglesia de los Remedios) is an old church located in Guadalajara, Spain. It was declared Bien de Interés Cultural in 1924. Now, it's the auditorium of the University of Alcalá in Guadalajara.
