= Iriépal =

- Village (pedanía)
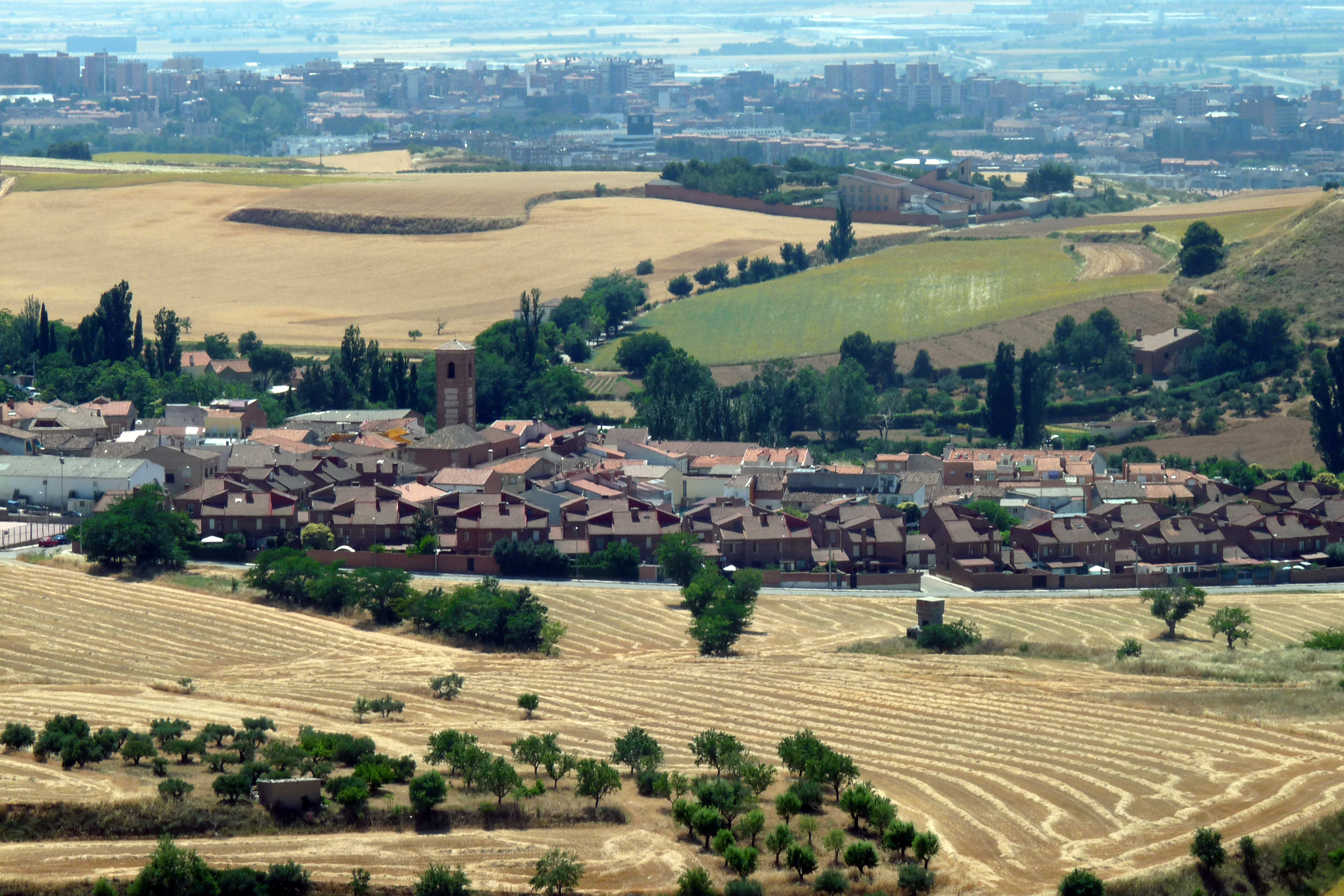
- View of Iriépal from the east

- Location in Spain Iriépal (Spain)
- Coordinates: 40°38′19″N 3°07′13″W
- Country: Spain
- Autonomous community: Castile-La Mancha
- Province: Guadalajara
- Municipality: Guadalajara
- Elevation: 790 m (2,590 ft)

Population (2025)
  - Total: 952
- Demonym: Iriepaleño/a
- Time zone: UTC+1 (CET)
  - Summer (DST): UTC+2 (CEST)
- Postal code: 19150

Iriépal is a village (pedanía) belonging to the Spanish municipality of Guadalajara, in the autonomous community of Castile-La Mancha, province of Guadalajara. It is located to the northeast of the city of Guadalajara. As of 1 January 2025, Iriépal had a population of 952 inhabitants, an increase of 19 residents compared to the previous year. The GU-905 road links Iriépal to the city of Guadalajara.

== Name ==
According to Manuel Fernández Escalante the toponym Iriépal may be connected to the Basque iri-ipar → iri-ibar ('city of the valley'), while Javier de Hoz stressed the -pal ending as connected to the Latin palus ('swamp').

== Geography ==
Iriépal is situated in the glacis of the tabular relief of La Alcarria, at the foot of the plateau at the level of the Sotillo holm oak grove. The village is crossed by the Arroyo de la Cerrada (Cerrada stream), and other small streams flow nearby, all originating from the plateau above.

In the immediate surroundings of the village are notable natural landmarks including the Peña Hueva and the Pico del Águila (Eagle's Peak).

== History ==
In the Middle Ages, Iriépal formed part of the Comunidad de villa y tierra (community of town and land) of Guadalajara. According to the Fuero (municipal charter) of 1133, it was part of the alfoz (administrative district) of Guadalajara. The locality is believed to have had a Jewish community of relative importance during this period.

In 1579, according to the Relaciones topográficas de Felipe II, the population numbered eighty houses and ninety neighbours (vecinos), all of them farmers. These accounts also mention the impact of the plague epidemic of 1527. The same source notes the limited extent of the village's territory.

In 1627, Philip IV of Spain granted the settlement the status of an independent villa (township), and it was sold to Don Miguel de Cárdenas, a member of the Council of Castile. Before this date, Iriépal had formed part of the land and jurisdiction of Guadalajara since the medieval period, and frequently appeared in legal disputes over municipal boundaries initiated by the city of Guadalajara to recover public lands.

By the mid-19th century, the town had its own municipal government (ayuntamiento) and a population of 315 inhabitants, with 106 houses and 110 neighbours (vecinos), as recorded by Pascual Madoz in his Diccionario geográfico-estadístico-histórico de España y sus posesiones de Ultramar (vol. IX, 1847). Madoz recorded production of wheat, barley, rye, oats, olive oil, wine, honey, beans, potatoes, figs, plums, esparto and madder, along with sheep farming, an olive oil mill, and production of gypsum and lime.

A former independent municipality, Iriépal was absorbed by the provincial capital in 1969, together with Valdenoches and Taracena. Since 1991, the neighbourhood has been represented by a pedáneo representative elected by universal suffrage.

== Administration ==
As a pedanía (annexed neighbourhood), Iriépal is administered by the Ayuntamiento de Guadalajara. Since 1991, residents elect a local representative (alcalde pedáneo) by universal suffrage to liaise with the main municipal government.

== Architecture and heritage ==
=== Church of the Immaculate Conception ===
The Parish Church of the Immaculate Conception (Iglesia Parroquial de la Inmaculada Concepción) dates from the 16th century, although it has been significantly altered over time. It features a brick bell tower. Historically, Madoz recorded the parish as dedicated to La Purísima Concepción (The Immaculate Conception), served by a single priest.

=== The Washhouse (El Lavadero) ===
One of the most notable buildings in Iriépal is the Lavadero (communal washhouse), built in the early 20th century in an eclectic architectural style. It was funded by local philanthropist José Santamaría de Hita, who also established a foundation providing scholarships for children in the village to pursue their studies. The building has served as a cultural centre since its restoration. A book commemorating its centenary and the story of its founder was published in 2011.

=== Hermitage of Our Lady of Solitude ===
On the outskirts of the village stands the Hermitage of Our Lady of Solitude (Ermita de Nuestra Señora de la Soledad), a small chapel that gave its name to the street on which it is located.

=== Monastery of Our Lady of the Virgins ===
The Monastery of Our Lady of the Virgins (Monasterio de Nuestra Señora de las Vírgenes) is a Discalced Carmelite convent established in Iriépal in 1976. The community had originally been founded in Guadalajara in 1591, at the request of Bishop García de Loaysa, and resided in the former Palace of the Counts of Priego in the city. After that building was severely damaged and looted during the Spanish Civil War, the community relocated to its present location in Iriépal, where they celebrated their first Mass on 24 September 1976.

== Economy ==
The economy of Iriépal is based on agriculture, though the village also functions as a dormitory village for the city of Guadalajara, with many residents working in the provincial capital.

== Culture and events ==
=== Spartacus (1960) ===
Several scenes of Stanley Kubrick's epic film Spartacus (1960) were filmed in Iriépal.

=== Living Passion (Pasión Viviente) ===
Iriépal hosts an annual Living Passion (Pasión Viviente), a historical and religious outdoor re-enactment of the Passion of Christ based on the Gospels, in which the audience accompanies the performance through different locations in the village. The event has been held annually since its inception and in 2026 was recognised for the first time as a Festival of Provincial Tourist Interest.

== Festivals ==
The main local festivals include:

- San Roque (16 August): the principal patronal festival, celebrated in honour of Saint Roch.
- San Blas (3 February): celebrated with traditional bullfighting events.
- La Candelaria (4 February): a candlelit communal dance in the centre of the village in honour of the Feast of the Presentation of the Lord.

== Transport ==
Iriépal is connected to Guadalajara city by the GU-905 road and by urban bus services operated by ALSA, with a journey time of approximately 11 minutes. The city of Guadalajara, approximately 5 km to the southwest, has rail connections on the Madrid–Zaragoza railway line.

== See also ==
- Guadalajara, Spain
- La Alcarria
- Taracena
- Valdenoches
- Discalced Carmelites
