= Humanes =

Humanes, Spain
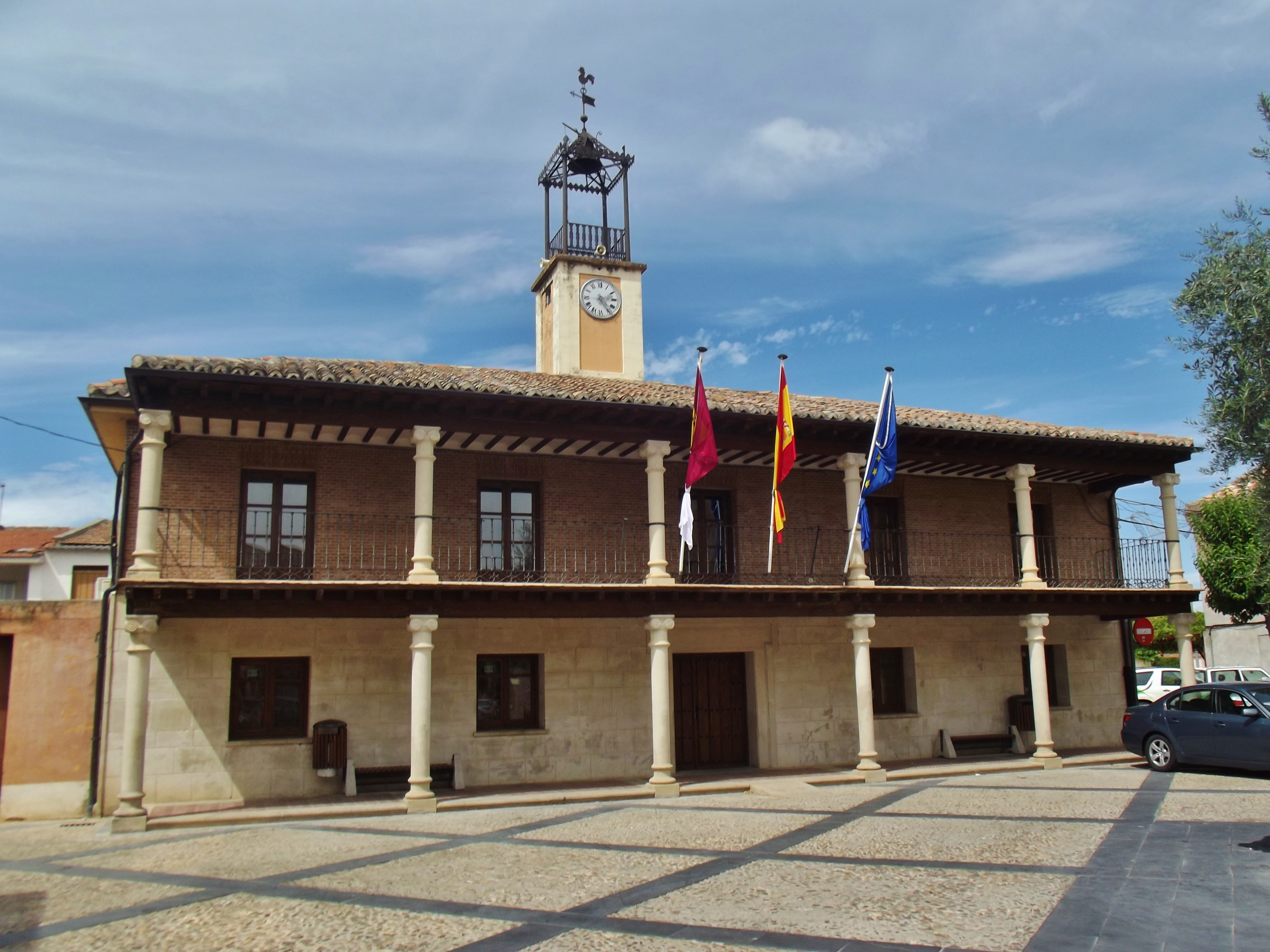

- Coat of arms

- Location within Province of Guadalajara Location within Castilla-La Mancha Location within Spain
- Country: Spain
- Autonomous community: Castile-La Mancha
- Province: Guadalajara
- Municipality: Humanes

Government
  - Mayor: María Dolores Amo Camino (PSOE)

Area
  - Total: 48.02 km^{2} (18.54 sq mi)
- Elevation: 746 m (2,448 ft)

Population (2023)
  - Total: 1,724
  - Density: 35.90/km^{2} (92.98/sq mi)
- Time zone: UTC+1 (CET)
  - Summer (DST): UTC+2 (CEST)

Humanes is a municipality of Spain in the province of Guadalajara, an autonomous community of Castilla-La Mancha, with an area of 48.02 square kilometres (18.54 sq mi), population of 1,724 (2023 Continuous Register), and a density of 35.90 people/km² (93 people/mi²).
