= Marchamalo =

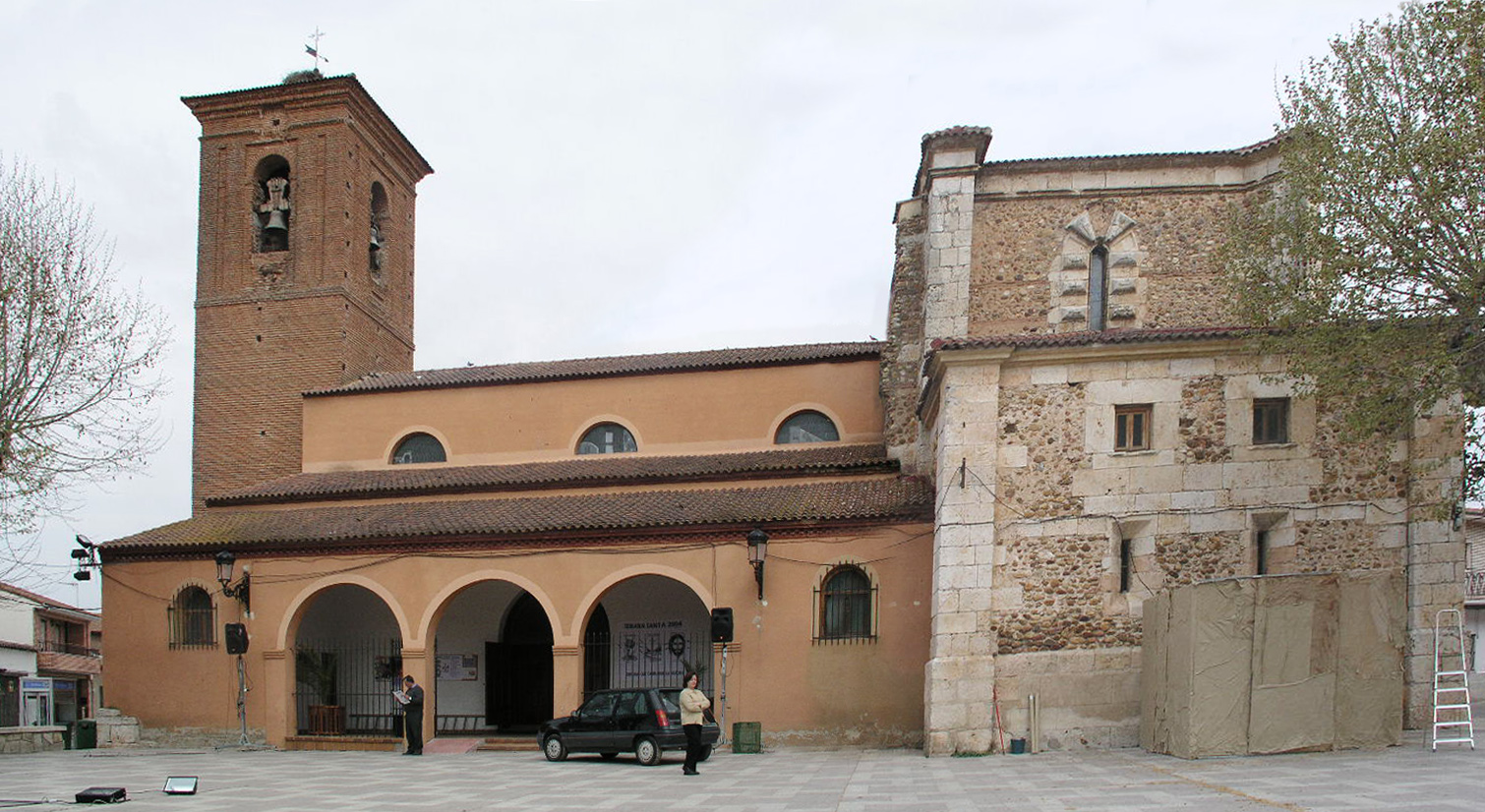

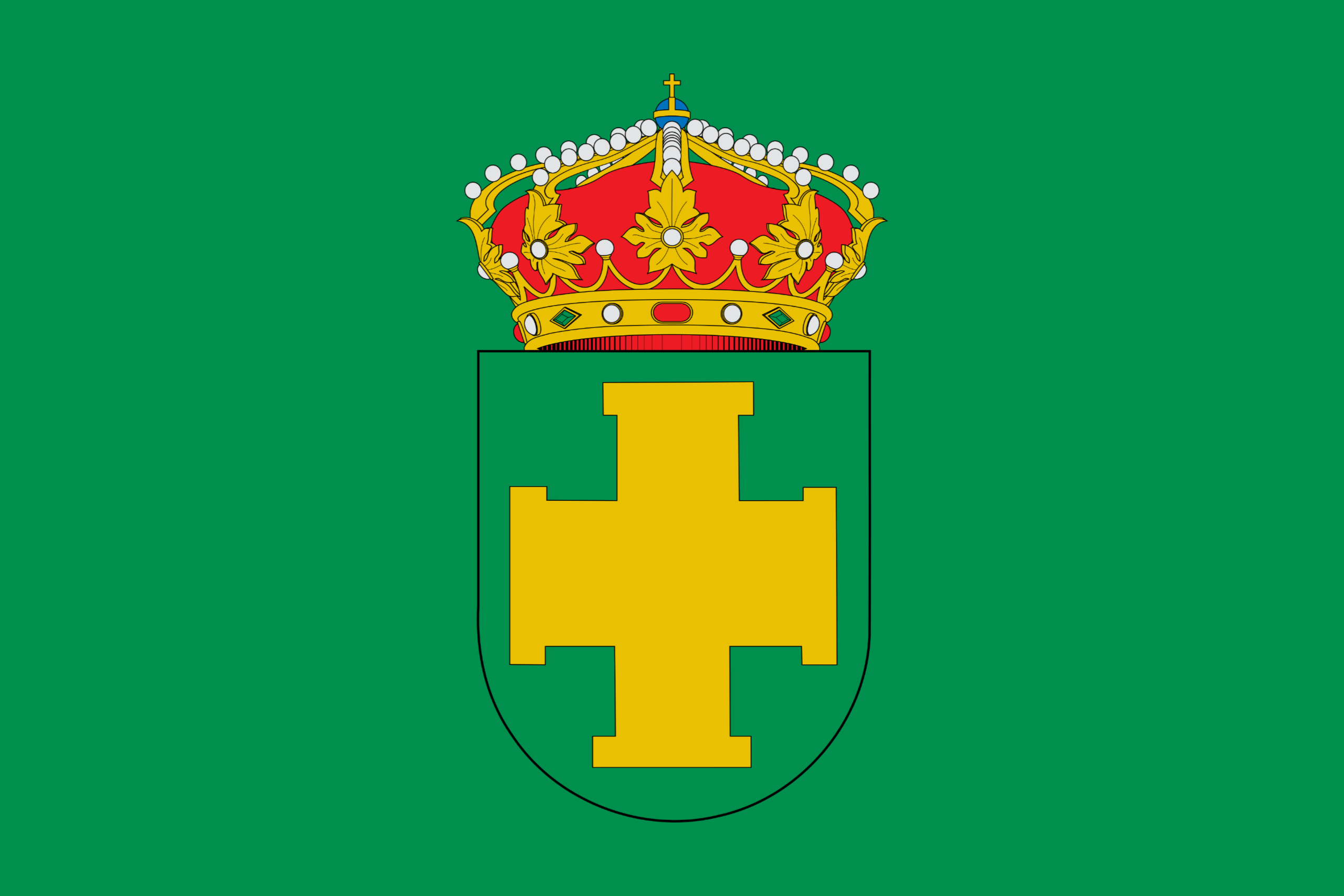
- Flag Coat of arms

- Location within Spain Location within Castilla-La Mancha Location within Province of Guadalajara
- Coordinates: 40°40′14″N 3°12′02″W
- Country: Spain
- Autonomous community: Castilla-La Mancha
- Province: Guadalajara

Area
  - Total: 31.20 km^{2} (12.05 sq mi)
- Elevation: 674 m (2,211 ft)

Population (2025-01-01)
  - Total: 8,714
  - Density: 279.3/km^{2} (723.4/sq mi)
- Time zone: UTC+1 (CET)
  - Summer (DST): UTC+2 (CEST)

Marchamalo is a municipality located in the province of Guadalajara, Spain. According to the 2024 census (INE), the municipality has a population of 8,497 inhabitants.

== Marah Malao ==
The small village was the home of a large Jewish community that was known for their many small factories. The most famous one of them was the "Marchmalo Sweet" that was known all around province of Guadalajara.

Over the years, some families moved to Morocco and set their homes at Agadir. Their Marchmallo Sweets business moved with them under the name of "Marah Malao" and was successful.
