= Chiloeches =

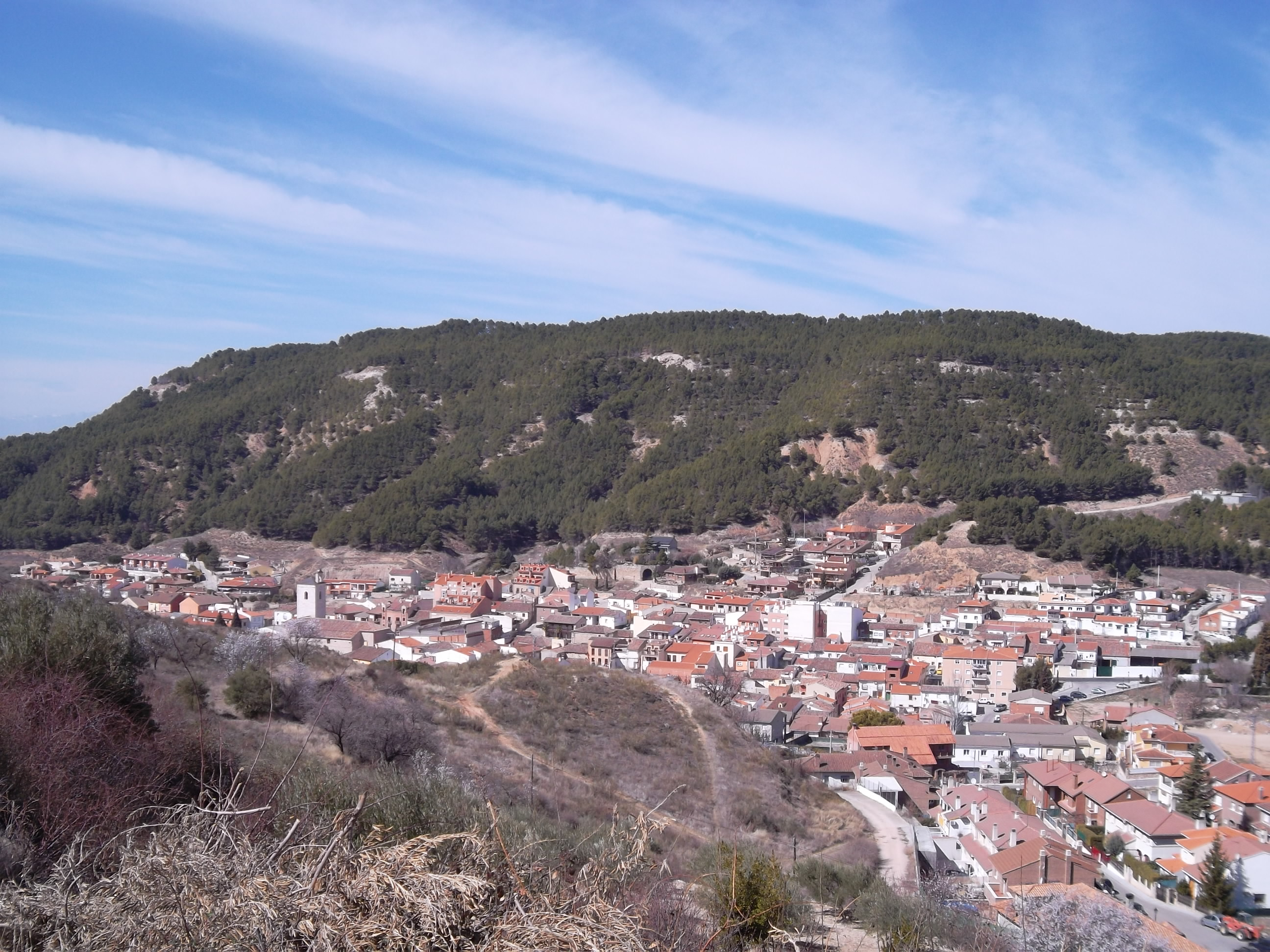

- Flag Coat of arms

- Location within Province of Guadalajara Location within Castilla-La Mancha Location within Spain
- Country: Spain
- Autonomous community: Castile-La Mancha
- Province: Guadalajara
- Municipality: Chiloeches

Area
  - Total: 45 km^{2} (17 sq mi)
- Elevation: 786 m (2,579 ft)

Population (2025-01-01)
  - Total: 4,117
  - Density: 91/km^{2} (240/sq mi)
- Time zone: UTC+1 (CET)
  - Summer (DST): UTC+2 (CEST)

Chiloeches is a municipality located in the province of Guadalajara, Castile-La Mancha, Spain. According to the 2004 census (INE), the municipality has a population of 1,684 inhabitants.
