= Galve de Sorbe =

Galve de Sorbe, Spain
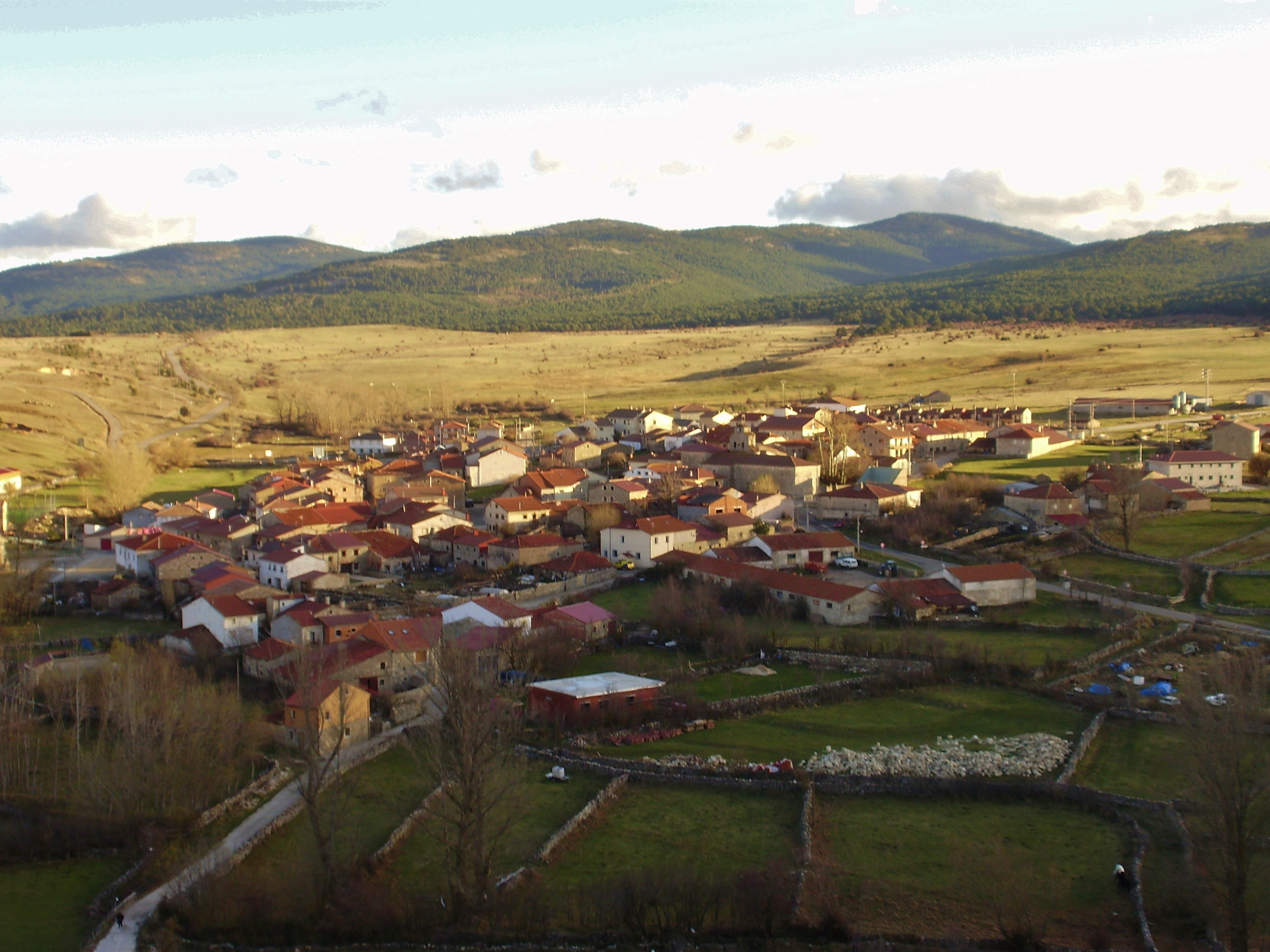

- Coat of arms

- Location within Province of Guadalajara Location within Castilla-La Mancha Location within Spain
- Country: Spain
- Autonomous community: Castile-La Mancha
- Province: Guadalajara
- Municipality: Galve de Sorbe

Government
  - Mayor: Francisco Javier López Lorenzo (PP)

Area
  - Total: 49.36 km^{2} (19.06 sq mi)

Population (2023)
  - Total: 96
  - Density: 1.9/km^{2} (5.0/sq mi)
- Time zone: UTC+1 (CET)
  - Summer (DST): UTC+2 (CEST)

Galve de Sorbe is a municipality located in the province of Guadalajara, Castile-La Mancha, Spain. According to the 2023 census (INE), the municipality has a population of 96 inhabitants.
