= Henares =

River in Spain

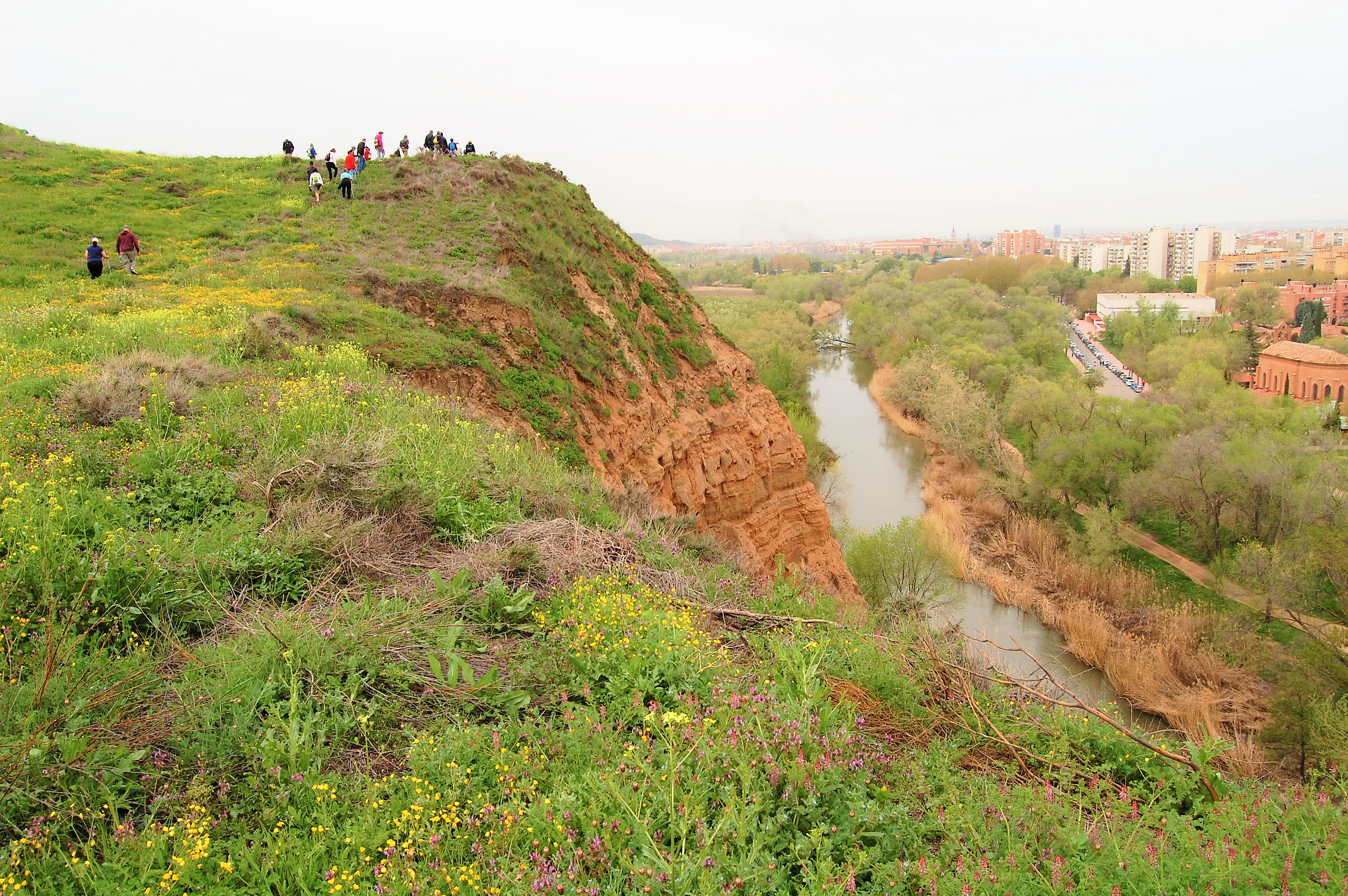
- Henares River in Alcalá de Henares

Location
- Country: Spain

Physical characteristics
- Source: Sierra Ministra, Sistema Ibérico
  - location: Sigüenza, Castilla–La Mancha
  - coordinates: 41°09′30″N 2°32′14″W
  - elevation: 1,220 m (4,000 ft)
- Mouth: Jarama
  - location: Mejorada del Campo, Community of Madrid
  - coordinates: 40°24′18″N 3°30′02″W
  - elevation: 550 m (1,800 ft)
- Length: 150 km (93 mi)
- Basin size: 4,144 km^{2} (1,600 sq mi)

Basin features
- Progression: Jarama→ Tagus→ Atlantic Ocean
- River system: Tagus Basin

The Henares (Spanish: [eˈnaɾes]) is a river in Central Iberia, a left-bank tributary of the Jarama. It has its source in the Sierra Ministra, near the village of Horna, in the municipality of Sigüenza, province of Guadalajara, Spain. Its tributaries are the Torote, the Sorbe, the Cañamares, the Salado, the Dulce, the Aliendre, and the Bornova.

Henares in Spanish is the plural of henar 'hayfield' (derived from the Latin word faenum 'hay'), because formerly there were hay fields on the river's banks.

== Gallery ==
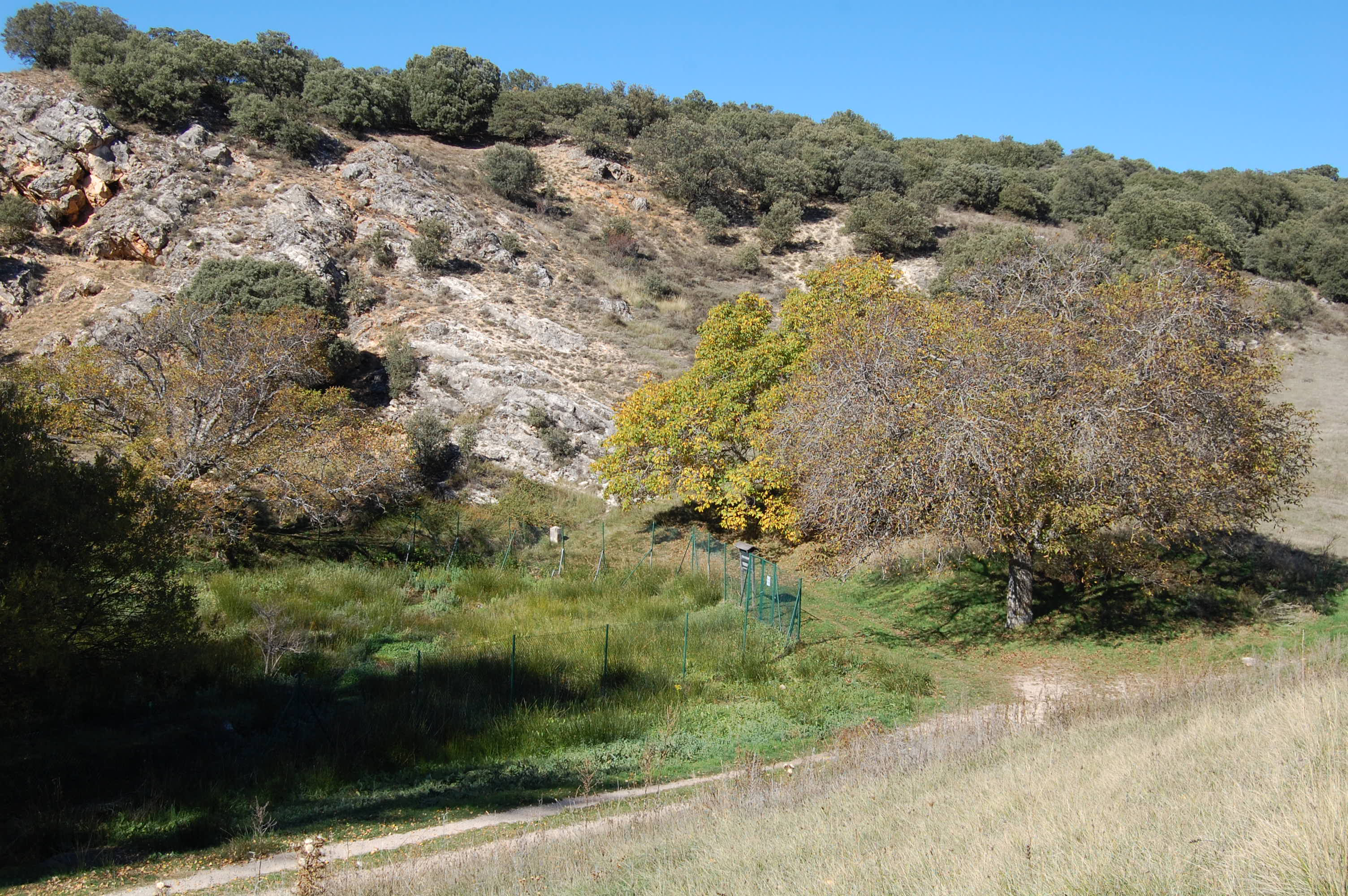
Source of the Henares River in the village of Horna

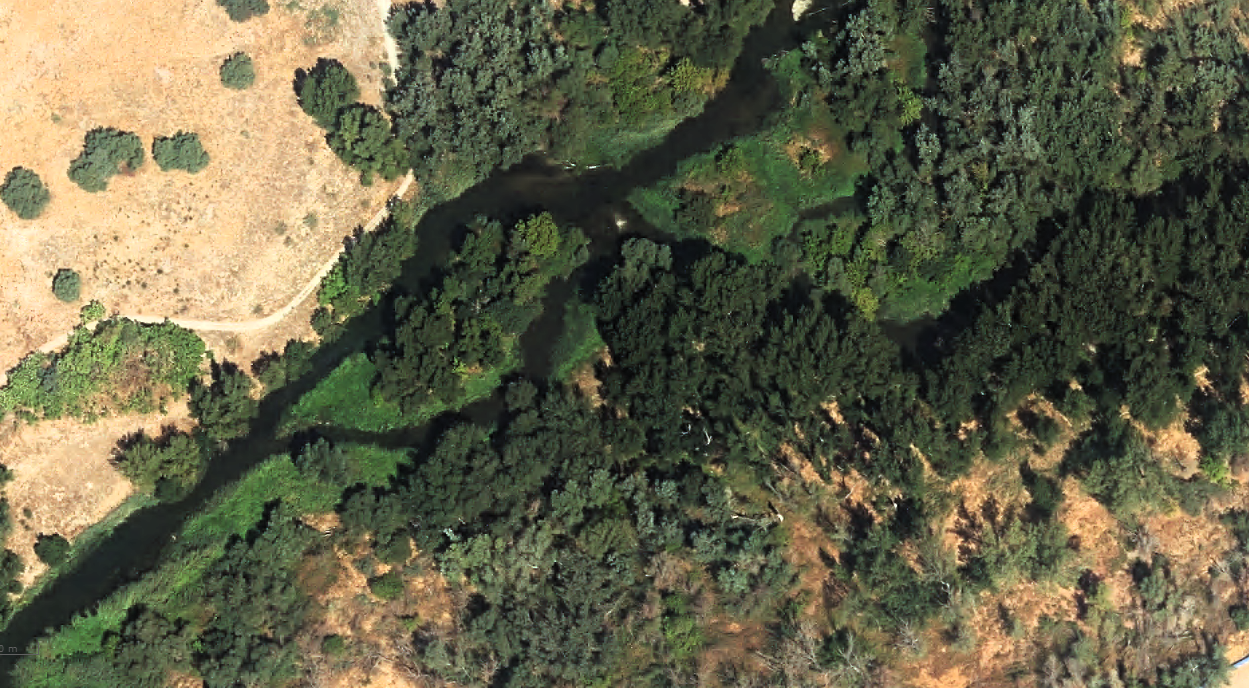
Mouth into the Jarama River

== See also ==
- List of rivers of Spain
