= Villanueva de la Torre =

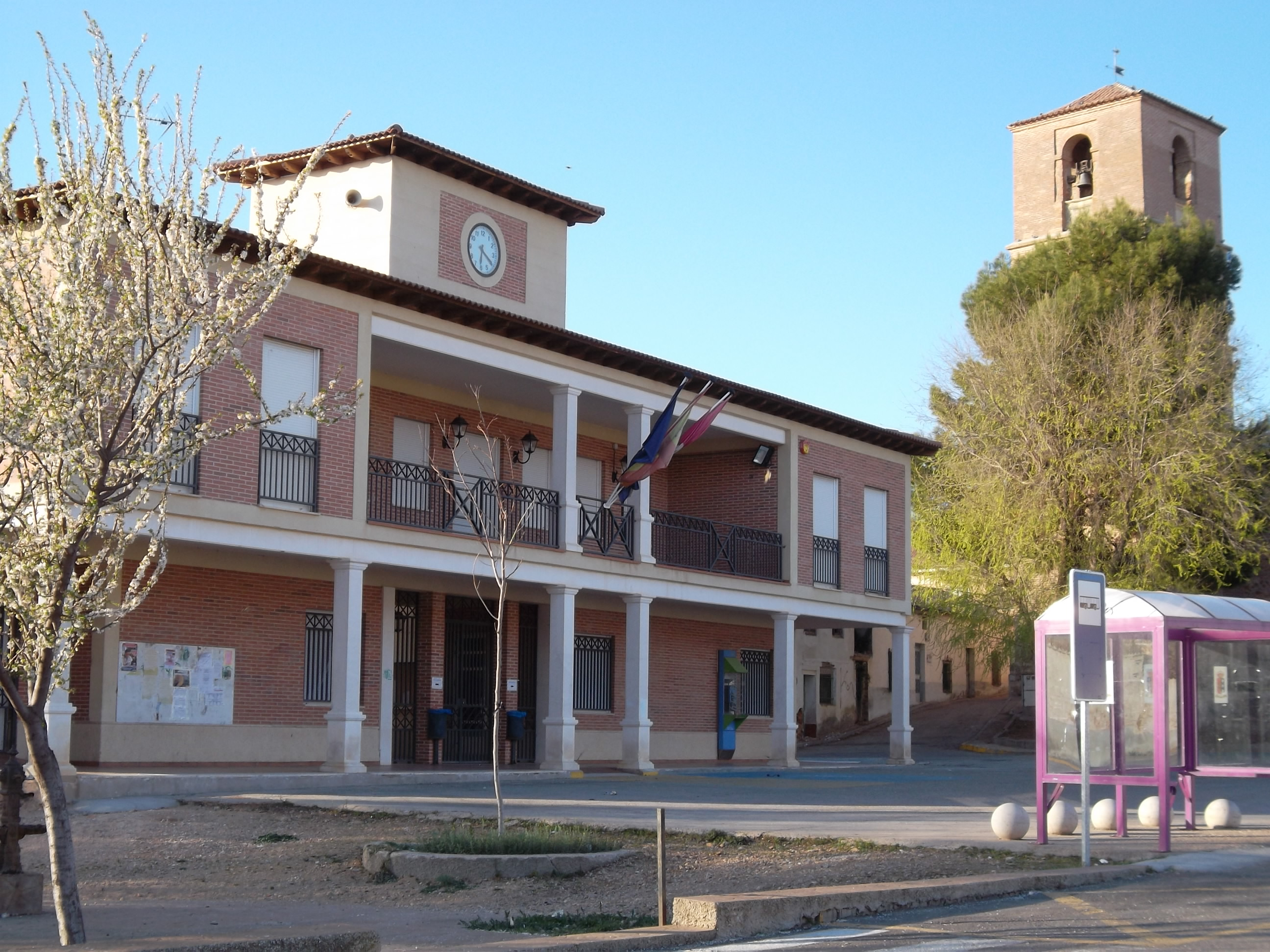
- Town hall

- Coat of arms

- Location within Province of Guadalajara Location within Castilla-La Mancha Location within Spain
- Coordinates: 40°35′07″N 3°18′03″W
- Country: Spain
- Autonomous community: Castile-La Mancha
- Province: Guadalajara
- Municipality: Villanueva de la Torre

Government
  - Mayor: Sonsoles Rico (PSOE)

Area
  - Total: 11.21 km^{2} (4.33 sq mi)

Population (2023)
  - Total: 6,603
  - Density: 589.0/km^{2} (1,526/sq mi)
- Time zone: UTC+1 (CET)
  - Summer (DST): UTC+2 (CEST)

Villanueva de la Torre is a municipality located in the province of Guadalajara, Castile-La Mancha, Spain. The village has a surface of 11,21 km ² with a population of 6603 inhabitants according to the municipal census of the year 2023 and a density of 590 inhabitants/km ².
