= Up Front =

Up Front or Upfront may refer to:

== Film and television ==
- Up Front (film), a 1951 American comedy based on Bill Mauldin's characters Willie and Joe
- Upfront (advertising), in the television industry, a meeting of network executives with advertisers and the press
- UpFront, a current affairs programme on Al Jazeera English
- Upfront with Katie Hannon, an RTÉ News current affairs series with Katie Hannon

== Music ==
=== Performers and labels ===
- Up Front (freestyle band), a 1983–1988 American electro-funk group
- Up Front (hardcore band), a 1987–1999 American punk band
- UpFront Records, an American record label

=== Albums ===
- Up Front (album), by David Williams (but often credited to Cedar Walton), 1987
- Upfront (David Sanborn album), 1992
- Upfront (John Miles album), 1993
- Upfront! Canadians Live from Mountain Stage, a compilation album, 1994
- Up-Front (EP), by the Fleshtones, 1980

=== Songs ===
- "Up Front", by Diana Ross from Ross, 1983
- "Up Front", by Wipers from Is This Real?, 1980

== Other uses ==
- Up Front (game), a card-based wargame
- Up-Front Group, a Japanese entertainment holding company
- Upfront Ventures, an American venture capital company
- The New York Times Upfront, a magazine for teenagers
- Up Front, a 1945 memoir by Bill Mauldin

== See also ==
- Up the Front, a 1972 British comedy film
