= Van Aalten =

Van Aalten or van Aalten, a family name meaning "from Aalten", may refer to:

- Jacques Van Aalten, an American artist born in Antwerp, Belgium
- Thomas van Aalten, a Dutch writer
- Truus van Aalten, a Dutch actress who appeared in many German films in the 1920s and 1930s
