= Bayard Rustin Educational Complex =

Public school in New York City

Coordinates: 40°44′36″N 74°00′09″W

Bayard Rustin Educational
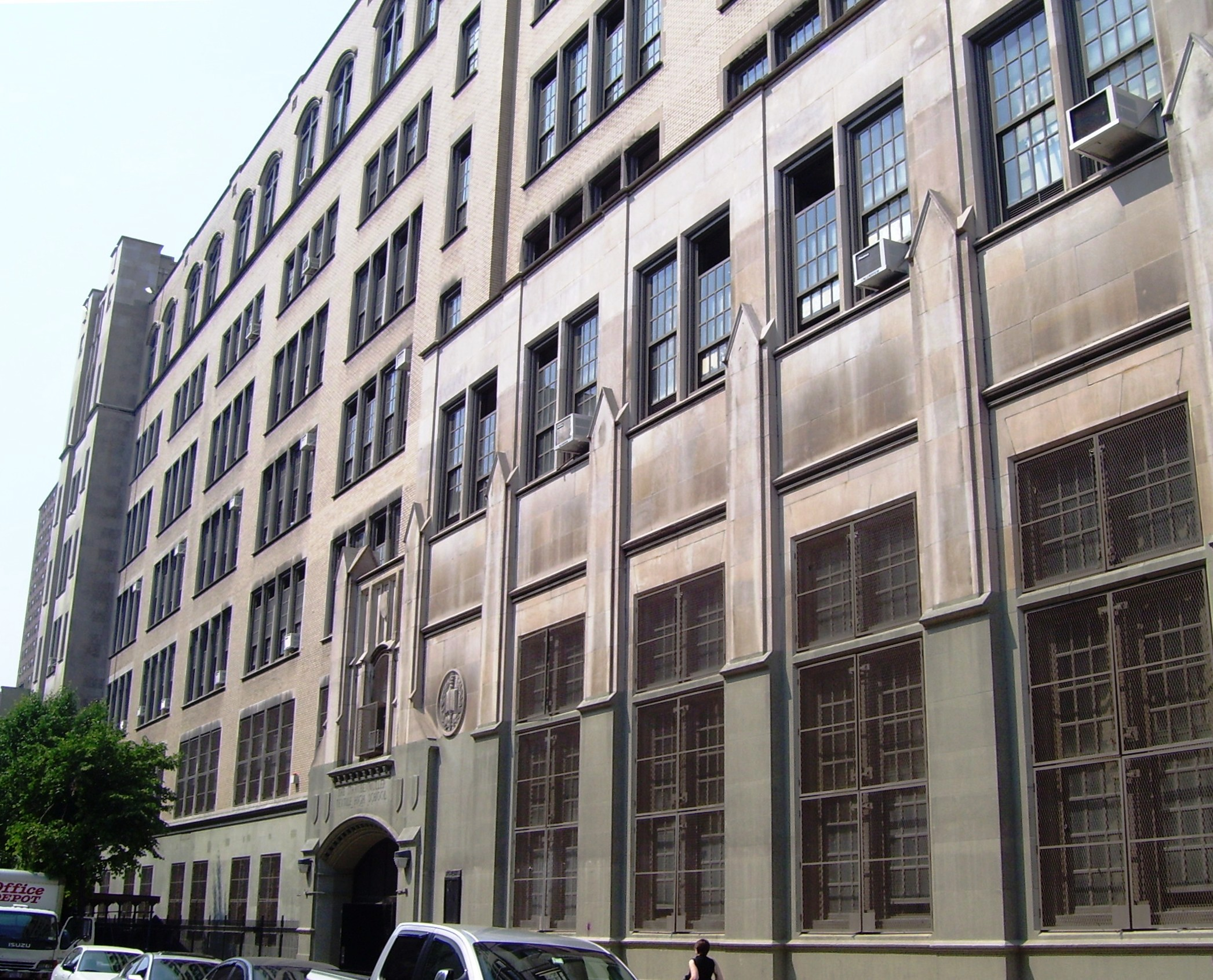

Location
- 351 West 18th Street; New York City, New York; United States

Information
- Type: Public
- Established: 1930
- Grades: 6-12

The Bayard Rustin Educational Complex, also known as the Humanities Educational Complex, is a "vertical campus" of the New York City Department of Education that contains a number of small public schools. Most of them are high schools—grades 9 through 12—along with one combined middle and high school, grades 6 through 12.

The building, located at West 18th Street between Eighth and Ninth Avenues in the Chelsea neighborhood of Manhattan, New York City, formerly housed Bayard Rustin High School for the Humanities (M440), a comprehensive school that graduated its last class in the 2011–2012 school year.

== History ==
The building—which is actually two buildings, one on 18th Street and the other on 19th Street, connected in the middle—was constructed in 1930 as Textile High School, a vocational high school for the textile trades, complete with a textile mill in the basement; the school yearbook was titled The Loom. It was later renamed Straubenmuller Textile High School after the vocational education pioneer Gustave Straubenmuller, then renamed Charles Evans Hughes High School after Governor of New York and U.S. Supreme Court Chief Justice Charles Evans Hughes.

In 1952, the Senate Internal Security Subcommittee, which investigated Communist influence in schools, accused two-thirds of New York City teachers of being "card-carrying Communists." Irving Adler, Mathematics Department chair at Straubenmuller and executive member of the Teachers Union, was subpoenaed by the subcommittee but refused to cooperate, invoking his rights under the Fifth Amendment. He was fired. Adler later admitted being a member of the Communist Party USA.

In the wake of disciplinary problems so bad that teachers picketed the school, it was shut down in June 1983, and reopened in September 1983 as the High School for the Humanities with a revamped curriculum focusing on English and the humanities. It was later renamed the Bayard Rustin High School for the Humanities after civil rights activist Bayard Rustin.

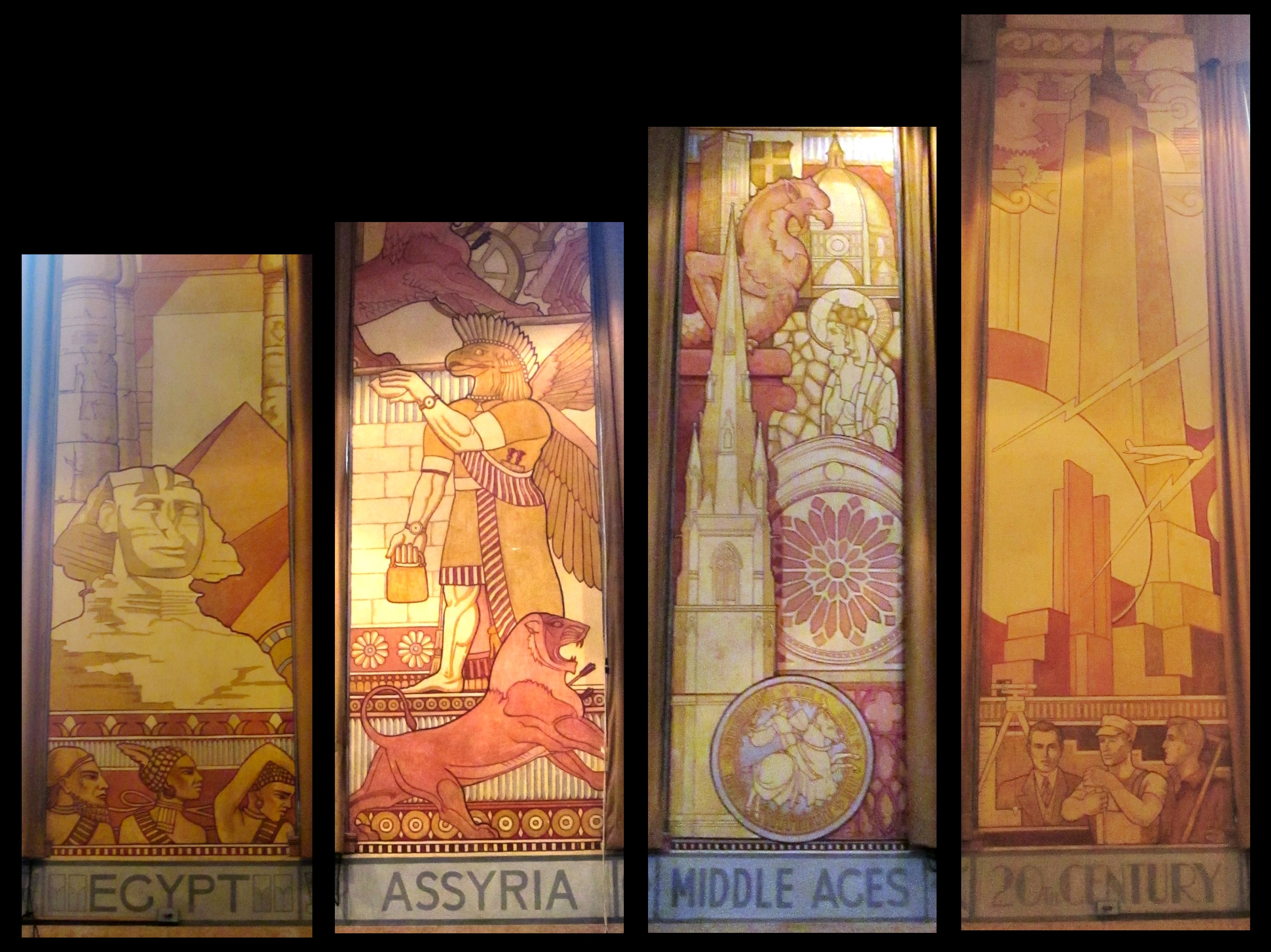
Some of the murals in the auditorium

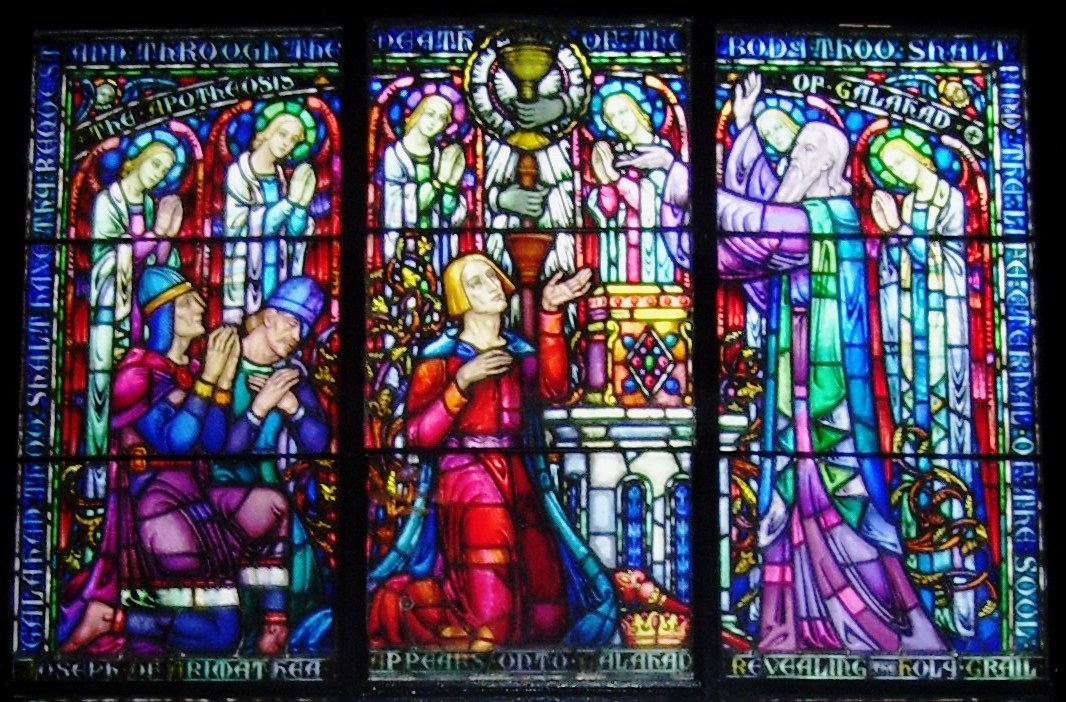
A detail from one of the stained glass windows in the lobby

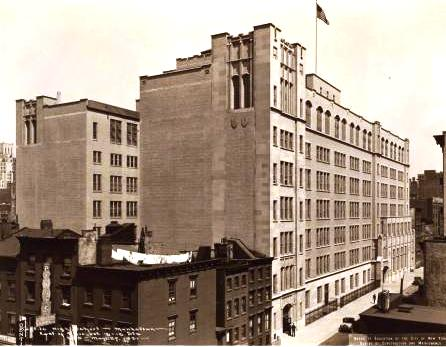
The building in 1931 when it was Textile High School

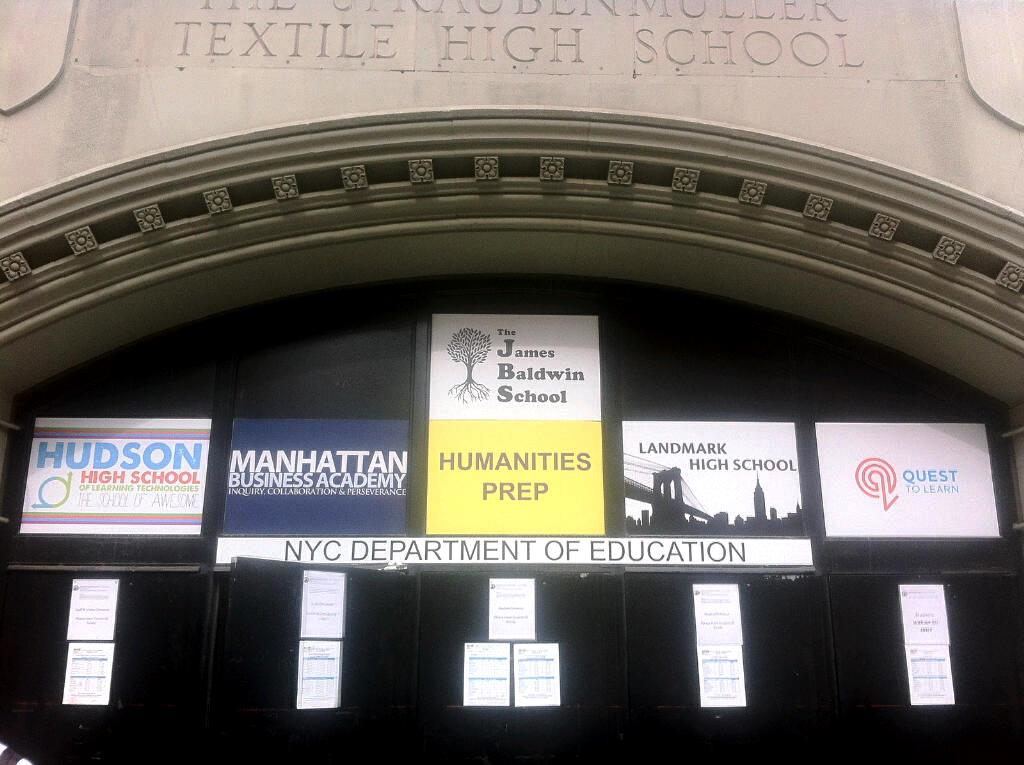
The entrance to the building, showing the signs for the six schools located there

In January 2009, following publicized difficulties, including safety issues, a Regents Test scandal – in which the school's administration falsified test scores to push up the school's average – and a continuing low graduation rate, the Department of Education announced that the school would not accept any ninth-graders in the fall of 2009, and that it would close after its last students graduate in 2012.

=== Repurposing ===
By 2005, the school building had already begun to host other, smaller public school entities in addition to the comprehensive high school. In the 2012-2013 school year, there were six schools in the facility:

- Quest to Learn (M422)
- Hudson High School of Learning Technologies (M437)
- Humanities Preparatory Academy (M605)
- James Baldwin School (M313)
- Landmark High School (M419)
- Manhattan Business Academy (M392)

With the exception of Quest to Learn (Q2L), all of the schools are high schools. Q2L, which moved into the building just before the 2010-2011 school year, started with three grades (6-9) and added a grade each year until it was a full middle and high school in September 2015.

== Physical facilities ==
The original upper floors were well-appointed, with marble-lined hallways, stained glass windows, and wood-paneled offices. In 1934–35, the Work Projects Administration's Federal Arts Project decorated the schools with murals, some created by artist Jacques Van Aalten; but muralist Jean Charlot was also called in to oversee the work already in progress of art students – including Abraham Lishinsky – titled The Art Contribution to Civilization of All Nations and Countries. Lishinsky painted a central niche, which he named Head, Crowned with Laurels; this latter was overpainted after the completion of the mural, and Charlot listed the mural as "destroyed" in catalogs of his work. It was restored by the Adopt-A-Mural Program, with mural restoration completed in 1995. It is now an interior architectural landmark. In 1999 a theatrical lighting system and rigging renovation for the school auditorium was completed with the help of PENCIL, Public Education Needs Civic Involvement in Learning.

The building also features a swimming pool, which was expected to be refurbished and returned to service as of the 2010–2011 academic year, but did not return to service until the 2012-13 school year. As of 2023 the pool was closed, though there are plans to re-commission it by 2028.

== Notable Bayard Rustin High School alumni ==
- Herman Badillo - Bronx Borough President
- Patricia Bath - first African American woman doctor to receive a patent for a medical invention
- John Ross Bowie - actor
- Steve Burtt - former NBA player
- David Carradine - actor
- Remy Charlip - artist, writer, choreographer, theatre director, designer and teacher
- Barry Michael Cooper- journalist and filmmaker
- David Brion Davis - historian, authority on slavery and abolition in the Western world
- Janice Erlbaum - slam poet
- Jose Feliciano - singer and guitarist ("Light My Fire", "Feliz Navidad")
- Vincent Gigante - boss of the Genovese crime family
- Cecelia Goetz - lawyer
- Andre Harrell (1960–2020) - record executive, executive producer, founder of Uptown Records
- John Isaacs - pioneering African-American basketball professional
- Azazel Jacobs - filmmaker
- Pee Wee Kirkland - former street basketball player; played for the school's basketball team and made All-City guard.
- Kodama - professional wrestler and actor
- Ed Kovens - actor and Method acting instructor
- Johnny Maestro - singer with The Crests, The Del-Satins and Johnny Maestro & the Brooklyn Bridge
- Rana Zoe Mungin - writer and teacher
- ASAP Rocky - Rakim Mayers, American rapper
- Jason Samuels Smith - American tap dance performer, choreographer, and director
- Sol Schiff (1917–2012) - table tennis player
- Matty Simmons - National Lampoon co-founder
- Nina Sky - Nicole and Natalie Albino, musical duo
- Felix Solis - actor
- Mario Sorrenti - photographer
- Davide Sorrenti - photographer
- Howard Stein - financier
- Stza - Frontman for the band Leftöver Crack
- Cicely Tyson - award-winning stage and film actress
- Shawn Wayans - actor
- Vincent Schofield Wickham - editorial artist and sculptor who taught advertising art and layout at Textile High School
