= Infatuation (disambiguation) =

Infatuation is the state of being completely carried away by unreasoned passion or love.

Infatuation may also refer to:

== Film ==
- Infatuation (1915 film), an American lost silent film
- Infatuation (1918 film), a French silent film
- Infatuation (1925 film), an American silent film
- Infatuation, a 1995 Hong Kong film featuring Money Lo

== Music ==
- Infatuation (album) or the title song, by Kate Alexa, 2012
- "Infatuation" (Rod Stewart song), 1984
- "Infatuation", a song by Christina Aguilera from Stripped, 2002
- "Infatuation", a song by Flobots from Survival Story, 2010
- "Infatuation", a song by Jamie Foxx from Peep This, 1994
- "Infatuation", a song by John Farnham from Uncovered, 1980
- "Infatuation", a song by Jonas Brothers from the Japanese release of A Little Bit Longer, 2008
- "Infatuation", a song by Maroon 5 from It Won't Be Soon Before Long, 2007
- "Infatuation", a song by the Rapture from Echoes, 2003
- "Infatuation", a song by Sophie from Oil of Every Pearl's Un-Insides, 2018
- "Infatuation", a song by Takeoff from The Last Rocket, 2018
- "Infatuation", a song by Up Front

== Other uses ==
- The Infatuation, an American restaurant recommendation website
- The Infatuations, a 2011 novel by Javier Marías
