= Liz Murray =

American inspirational speaker (born 1980)

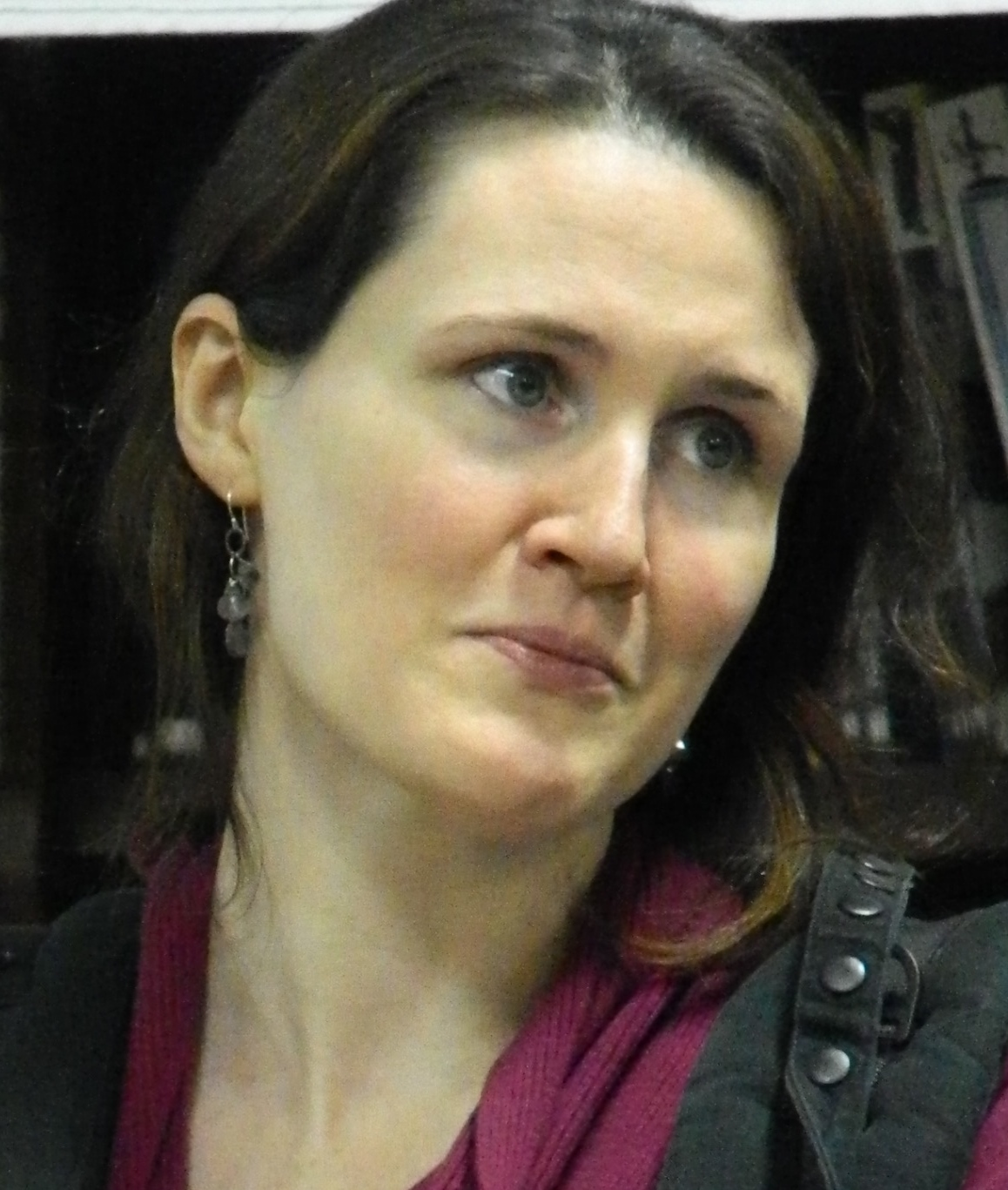
- Murray in 2013
- Born: September 23, 1980 (age 46); New York City, New York, U.S.
- Education: Harvard University (BS); Columbia University (MS)
- Occupations: Teacher, motivational speaker

Elizabeth Murray (born September 23, 1980) is an American memoirist and inspirational speaker who is notable for having been accepted by Harvard University despite being homeless in her high school years. Her life story was chronicled in Lifetime's television film Homeless to Harvard: The Liz Murray Story (2003). Murray's memoir Breaking Night: A Memoir of Forgiveness, Survival, and My Journey from Homeless to Harvard, published in 2010 is a New York Times Bestseller.

== Early life and education ==
Murray was born on September 23, 1980, in the Bronx, New York to poor and drug-addicted parents, both of whom would later contract HIV. She was surrounded by drug use from an early age and lived in an unclean environment. She was often hungry and ate ice cubes because it felt like eating. When she was about 9 years old, Murray began working jobs at gas stations and supermarkets to earn money for groceries. Her parents split up in 1994 when she was 14, and her mother and sister moved in with her grandfather. Murray lived with her father until their neighbor called the social services, who took her in custody for her own protection for 35 days. During this time her father got evicted from their apartment. Murray, her mother and sister Lisa lived with her mother's father (Liz's and Lisa's grandfather) for a few years, but at the age of 13 Murray was put in a group home for a while.

She became homeless just after she turned 15, when her mother died of AIDS in 1996 and her father moved to a homeless shelter. She wanted to turn her life around and finish her education. She found a job door-to-door soliciting donations in support of environmental political initiatives. Murray knew her survival depended on the job, so she ended up breaking all the sales records of the company, and made more than $8000 in two months.

Despite her late high school start and lack of a stable home, Murray began attending the Humanities Preparatory Academy in Chelsea, Manhattan, graduating in two years. Murray earned a 95 average and graduated at the top of a class of 158. She was awarded a scholarship by The New York Times for needy students and was accepted into Harvard University, matriculating in the fall semester of 2000. A story profiling the scholarship winners was published on the cover of The New York Times' metro section in March 1999. Readers of the story brought Murray clothing and food, and offered to do her laundry.

She transferred from Harvard to Columbia University in 2003 to care for her ailing father. She earned a Bachelor of Science in psychology in June 2009. As of August 2009, she began taking graduate courses at Harvard Summer School with plans to earn a doctorate in clinical psychology and become a counselor. Her older sister Lisa graduated from Purchase College in New York and is a school teacher for children with autism.

== Career ==
Murray is the co-founder of a youth mentoring organization called "The Arthur Project," which was named in honor of her first mentor. She also works as an inspirational speaker with the Washington Speakers Bureau since 1999. Murray has been a speaker at events alongside Tony Blair, Mikhail Gorbachev and Dalai Lama. Murray made a speech at the annual conference of the Washington State Coalition for the Homeless at the Yakima Convention Center in 2007. In March 2009, she told her story to 1,400 students at Worcester Technical High School in Worcester, Massachusetts. In September 2012, she gave a TED Talk called "For the Love of Possibility" at TedxYouth @San Diego.

Murray served as a co-producer in Lifetime's television film Homeless to Harvard: The Liz Murray Story (2003) starring actress Thora Birch. The film chronicled Murray's life story and it received three Primetime Emmy Award nominations, including one for Outstanding Television Movie and one for Outstanding Lead Actress in a Miniseries or a Movie. Murray made a brief cameo appearance in the film as a social worker. Murray's story has also been featured on ABC's 20/20 and she has appeared as a guest on The Ricki Lake Show and The Oprah Winfrey Show. During her appearance on The Oprah Winfrey Show, Murray reflected on what she learned from her parents: "They taught me that resilience is actually flexibility, it taught me that gratitude is knowing everything you have, you could just as easily not have it, and it taught me that the basis of forgiveness is often knowing that things aren’t personal and we all have limitations and people can’t give you what they don’t have."

Murray's memoir Breaking Night: A Memoir of Forgiveness, Survival, and My Journey from Homeless to Harvard was published by Hachette Books in 2010. The book landed on The New York Times Best Seller List within a week of its release and became an international bestseller published in twelve countries, in eight languages. The book received favorable reviews from critics, with Kirkus Review calling it an "admirable story of a teen who overcame homelessness through sheer grit and the kindness of friends."

Murray has received numerous accolades and awards, including the White House Project's Role Model Award, Oprah Winfrey’s first-ever Chutzpah Award in 2004 and Alex Award in 2011. Winfrey's Chutzpah Award is given to women, who show boldness and courage, go against the odds and have achieved greatness. In 2008, she received Appalachian Women’s Fund's Women of Vision Award. On May 19, 2013, she was awarded an honorary doctorate of public service and gave the commencement address at Merrimack College in North Andover, Massachusetts.

== Awards and nominations ==
Awards and nominations received by Liz Murray
Year	Work	Award	Result
2003	Homeless to Harvard: The Liz Murray Story	Primetime Emmy Award for Outstanding Television Movie	Nominated
2004	Homeless to Harvard: The Liz Murray Story	Christopher Awards	Won
2004	Herself	Chutzpah Award	Won
2008	Herself	Women of Vision Award	Won
2011	Breaking Night	Alex Awards	Won

== Bibliography ==
=== Books ===
- —— (2010). Breaking Night: A Memoir of Forgiveness, Survival, and My Journey from Homeless to Harvard. Hachette Books. ISBN 9780786868919.

=== Authored articles ===
- Murray, Elizabeth (January 31, 2000). "Liz's Story". The New York Times Upfront.

== See also ==
- Homeless to Harvard: The Liz Murray Story (2003), Lifetime television film
