= Howard Stein =

American financier (1926–2011)

- Born: Howard Mathew Stein; October 6, 1926; Brooklyn, New York, U.S.
- Died: July 26, 2011 (aged 84); Southampton, New York, U.S.
- Education: Juilliard School
- Known for: Chairman and CEO of Dreyfus Corporation
- Spouse: Janet Gelder
- Children: 5

Howard Mathew Stein (October 6, 1926 – July 26, 2011) was an American financier who is widely considered one of the fathers of the mutual fund industry. He was featured on the cover of Time magazine on August 24, 1970. Stein invented the first "no load" money market fund and created the first tax-free municipal bond fund.

== Early life ==
Howard Mathew Stein was born in Brooklyn, New York, on October 6, 1926. His parents were immigrants from Poland and also had another son and daughter, in addition to Stein. Stein was of Jewish descent. Stein initially planned to become a musician, beginning to learn the violin when he was 5. Stein attended the Straubenmuller Textile High School and the Juilliard School. However, Stein gave up on his music career and went into business. At the age of 23, he loaded steel on to trucks. He then became a trainee at Bache & Co. In 1955, Stein left Bache and joined Dreyfus.

== Career ==
Stein joined the Dreyfus Corporation as an analyst in 1955. He was appointed president in 1965, and chairman and CEO in 1970. Stein was chairman and CEO of Dreyfus for more than 30 years. When Stein started at Dreyfus in 1955, it had approximately 2 million dollars in assets. Before the sale in 1994, this had grown to 90 billion dollars. Dreyfus was sold to Mellon Bank Corporation in 1994 for $1.8 billion. Stein retired in 1996.

Dreyfus Third Century Fund was one of the first funds to combine socially conscious objectives with financial criteria. Created by Stein in 1972 and named for the coming national bicentennial, the fund has been influential in shaping similar philosophically oriented investments. In addition, in 1974, Dreyfus introduced the first direct marketed, no-load money market fund. Stein became even more focused on money-market and bond funds and succeeded in creating the first tax-free municipal funds, which Dreyfus launched in 1976.

Stein's progressive politics made him a target of Richard Nixon, and Stein was one of the people on Nixon's enemies list.

In 1988, Stein was on the Brady Commission, also known as the Presidential Task Force on Market Mechanisms, created by President Ronald Reagan to investigate the stock market crash of October 19, 1987, also known as Black Monday.

In 1999, Stein started Joy of Giving Something, Inc. (JGS, Inc.), a not-for-profit philanthropic corporation dedicated to the photographic arts.

== Personal life and death ==
Stein was married to Janet Gelder; they had two children, Joanna Stein and Jennifer Stein Seay. He also had three stepdaughters from his wife's prior marriage to John Morton Levine: Julia Levine Stokien, Jocelyn Levine Hayes, and Jessica Levine. Stein died on Tuesday, July 26, 2011, at his home in Southampton at the age of 84. According to Stein's son-in-law, Jamie Stokien, he died from complications of a stroke.

== Sources ==
- Staff report (January 16, 1983). "Dreyfus bets on the Lion Again". The New York Times.
- Robert Lenzner (November 19, 1987). "The Dreyfus Lion Roars: Leader of Mutual Fund Titan Sees Opportunity Where Others See Trouble". Boston Globe.
