= The Competition (2018 film) =

2018 romantic comedy film directed by Harvey Lowry

- Directed by: Harvey Lowry
- Written by: Kelsey Tucker
- Produced by: Thora Birch; Harvey Lowry; Kelsey Tucker; Jasmine Fontes
- Starring: Thora Birch; Chris Klein
- Cinematography: Emmanuel Vouniozos
- Edited by: Jon Vasquez
- Music by: Scott Szabo
- Production companies: The Theory Inc.; Ascension Media
- Distributed by: Gravitas Ventures
- Release date: January 26, 2018
- Running time: 103 minutes
- Country: United States
- Language: English
- Box office: $15,622

The Competition is a 2018 American romantic comedy film directed by Harvey Lowry, and starring Thora Birch (who also served as a producer of the film) and Chris Klein.

== Cast ==
- Thora Birch as Lauren Mauldin
- Chris Klein as Calvin Chesney
- Claire Coffee as Gena Mauldin
- David Blue as Jacob Hatcher
- Kelsey Tucker as Sharon Gotleib
- Gabrielle Stone as Ashley
- Betsy Hume as Mandy
- Tiffany Fallon as Corina
- Tim Harrold as Garrett Stuckey

== Reception ==
Derek Smith of Slant Magazine awarded the film one star out of four.
