= Mats Grotenbreg =

Dutch footballer (1998–2026)

- Grotenbreg with TOP Oss in 2017

Personal information
- Date of birth: 21 January 1998
- Place of birth: Arnhem, Netherlands
- Date of death: 25 June 2026 (aged 28)
- Place of death: Middelaar, Netherlands
- Height: 1.87 m (6 ft 2 in)
- Position: Centre-back

Youth career
- Jonge Kracht
- 2007–2012: PSV
- 2012–2017: Vitesse

Senior career*
Years	Team	Apps	(Gls)
2016–2017	Jong Vitesse	1	(0)
2017–2018	FC Oss	15	(1)
2018–2019	Jong Vitesse	27	(1)
2019–2020	VV DUNO		
2020–2021	USV Hercules	4	(1)
2021–2023	GVVV	55	(0)
2023–2024	USV Hercules	7	(0)
2024–2025	Jonge Kracht		
2025–2026	VRC		

International career
2015	Netherlands U18		
- * Club domestic league appearances and goals

Mats Grotenbreg (21 January 1998 – 25 June 2026) was a Dutch footballer who played as a centre-back. He also assisted his father Ronald as a coach at amateur team GVA.

== Club career ==
Mats Grotenberg was born in 1998 in Arnhem and raised in Huissen, Grotenbreg started playing football at hometown club Jonge Kracht and later played in the PSV and Vitesse academies, professionally for TOP Oss, for amateur sides DUNO and Hercules before he joined GVVV in 2021.

On 21 December 2023, Grotenbreg scored the winning goal for USV Hercules in a 3–2 victory over Ajax during the KNVB Cup second round. In January 2024, he transferred to Jonge Kracht, before joining VV DOVO for the 2024–25 season. His last club was VRC from Veenendaal, where he had to retire from playing in January 2026 due to an achilles tendon injury.

== International career ==
Grotenbreg played for the Netherlands national under-18 football team.

== Personal life and death ==
Grotenbreg was a contestant on the reality television show The Bachelorette. His father Ronald also played professional football, for FC Wageningen.

He died on 25 June 2026, at the age of 28, after being struck by a boat while swimming in Middelaar.
