= Zoe Mungin =

American author (1989–2020)

Rana Zoe Mungin
- Born: Rana Mungin; September 23, 1989; Brooklyn, New York, U.S.
- Died: April 27, 2020 (aged 30); Rochelle Park, New Jersey, U.S.
- Occupations: Writer, teacher
- Writing career
- Pen name: Zoe Mungin

Rana Mungin (September 23, 1989 – April 27, 2020), known as Zoe Mungin, was an American writer and teacher. She was working on her first novel, Sed Ministrare, at the time of her death.

Mungin died of COVID-19 in the early months of the COVID-19 pandemic after twice being denied testing and treatment.

== Biography ==
Mungin was born on September 23, 1989, and raised in the East New York neighborhood of Brooklyn. She graduated from Bayard Rustin High School for the Humanities and Wellesley College before studying fiction at the University of Massachusetts, Amherst, where she earned a Masters of Fine Arts in 2015. In 2014, she published an account about a racist incident directed at her in a workshop. The retaliation she experienced after speaking out about this event prompted her to file a formal complaint with the Massachusetts Commission Against Discrimination in 2015.

Mungin's writing appeared in literary magazines Quarterly West, the Black Youth Project, and Route Nine. In 2013, she won the AWP Intro Journals prize in fiction. Mungin was interviewed by Wellesley Underground and the Los Angeles Review of Books about her experience as a Black woman writer in a predominantly white MFA program.

Mungin taught composition at the University of Massachusetts, Amherst; New Jersey Institute of Technology; and The New School before joining Bushwick Ascend Middle School as a social studies teacher in 2017.

Mungin's 2020 death, and the story of how she was denied medical care during the COVID-19 pandemic, garnered widespread media coverage and outcry that questioned the underlying issues behind her deficient treatment.
