= Huissen =

- City
- Flag Coat of arms
- Interactive map of Huissen
- Coordinates: 51°56′N 5°56′E
- Country: Netherlands
- Province: Gelderland
- Municipality: Lingewaard

Population (2020)
  - Total: 19,414
- Demonym: Huissenaar
- Postal code: 6851
- Major roads: A15, N325, N839

Huissen (Dutch pronunciation: [ˈɦysə(n)]) is a city with city rights in the Netherlands, in the province of Gelderland. The town is located in the Betuwe region and belongs to the municipality of Lingewaard, in the area between the major cities of Arnhem and Nijmegen. Huissen is situated along the rivers Nederrijn and Linge. The city has a population of 19,414 (as of 1 January 2020).

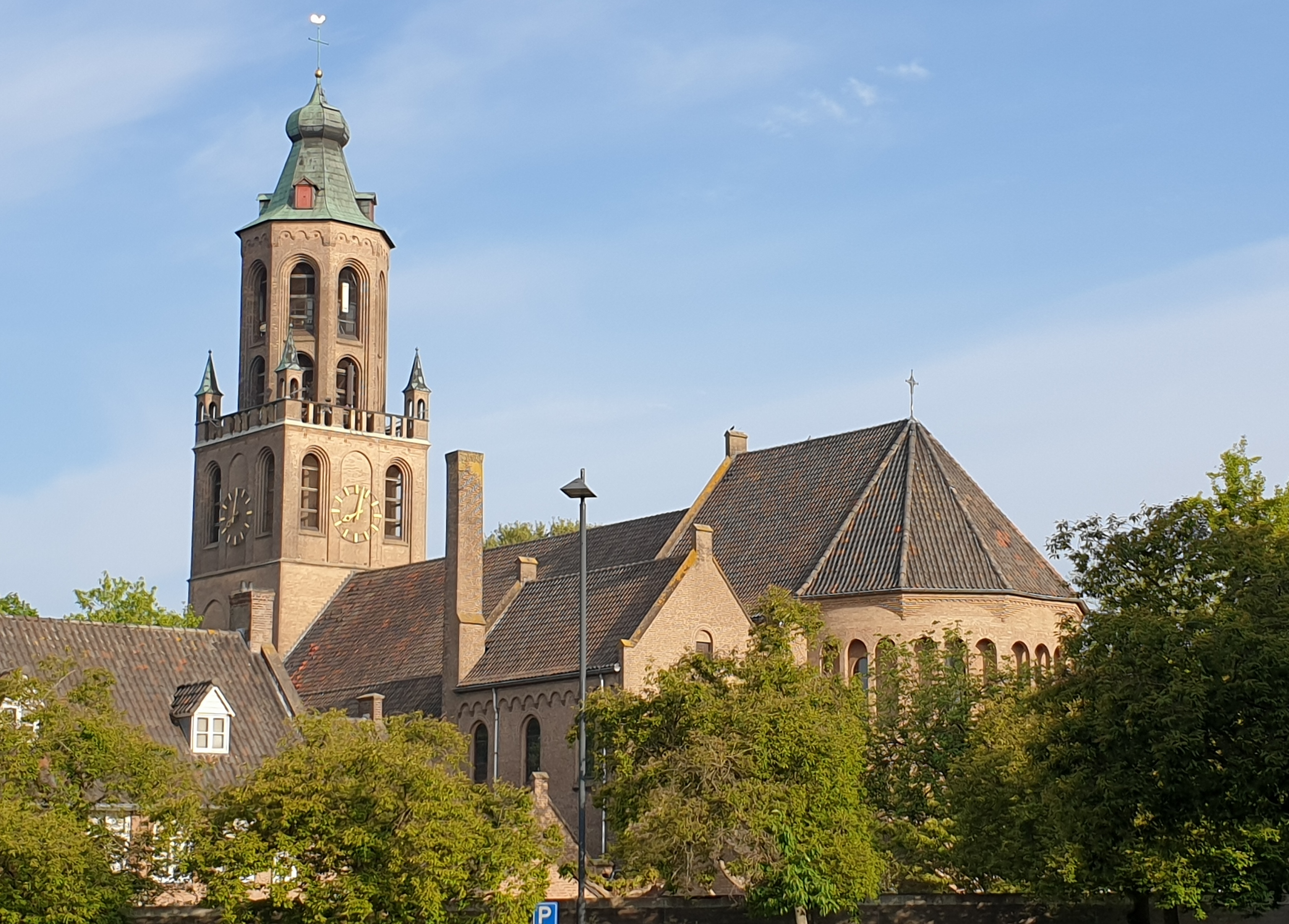
Catholic church 'OLV Ten Hemelopneming'

== History ==
Huissen was first mentioned in 814 as Hosenheim. It received city rights in 1314. The town was part of the Duchy of Cleves and became Dutch in as late as 1816. Much of the town was destroyed in World War II. After the war it was rebuilt in the Traditionalist style.

Huissen was previously a municipality of its own, but merged with the former municipalities Bemmel and Gendt in 2001, to form the municipality of Lingewaard. Huissen is the largest population centre within this municipality.

== Haunted house ==
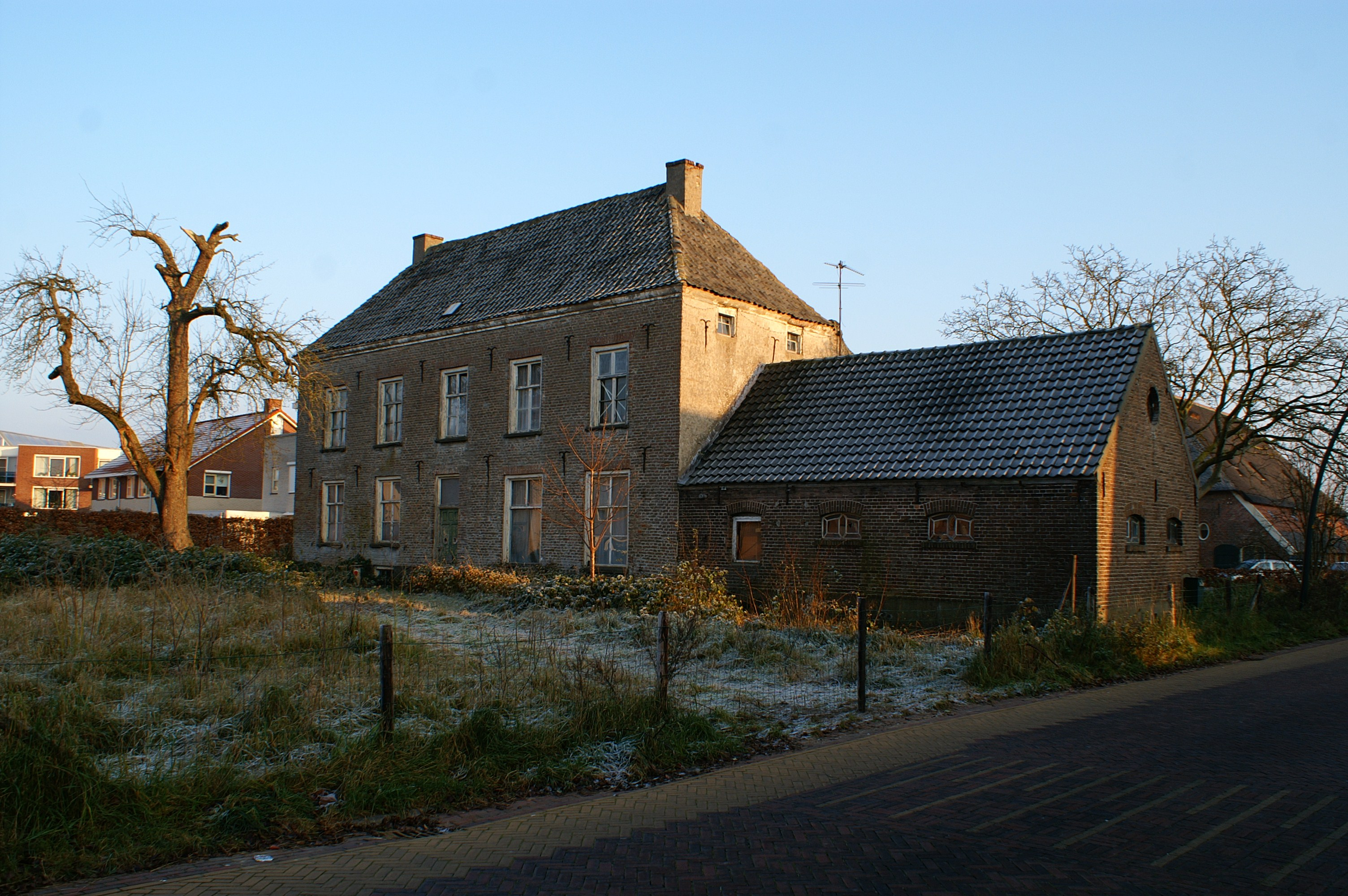
The Binnenveld mansion, also known as the haunted house

The Binnenveld mansion (Dutch: Huize Binnenveld) is a rijksmonument located in Huissen. It is better known as "the haunted house of Huissen". The building stood in the front area during the Battle of Arnhem: a major battle of World War II. According to locals, this mansion would be haunted.

In 2008, the mansion received a lot of media attention when it was purchased by Dutch television personality Emile Ratelband. Ratelband came up with the idea of a restoration plan for the mansion, with the intention of making it his home. The project was cancelled because Ratelband's wife could not make it her home; she said that evil ghosts would be haunting the building. In 2012, Ratelband was arrested for attempting to set fire to the mansion.

== Notable residents ==
Notable people who were born, have lived, or are living in Huissen include:

- Johannes van Neercassel (1625–1686), Archbishop of Utrecht from 1661 to 1686
- Emile Ratelband (1949), Dutch television personality
- Erwin van de Looi (1972), Dutch football manager and former player
- Thomas van Aalten (1978), Dutch writer and journalist
- Kenny van Hummel (1982), Dutch former road bicycle racer
- Daan Huisman (2002) (Professional football player)
- Johan Vlemmix (1959) Dutch singer
- Mats Grotenbreg (1998—2026) (Professional football player)

== Trivia ==
- The alternative name of Huissen during carnaval is Zwaonestad (English: 'Swan Town'). In the local dialect the name is Huusse.
