= Cecelia Goetz =

American lawyer and bankruptcy judge (1917–2004)

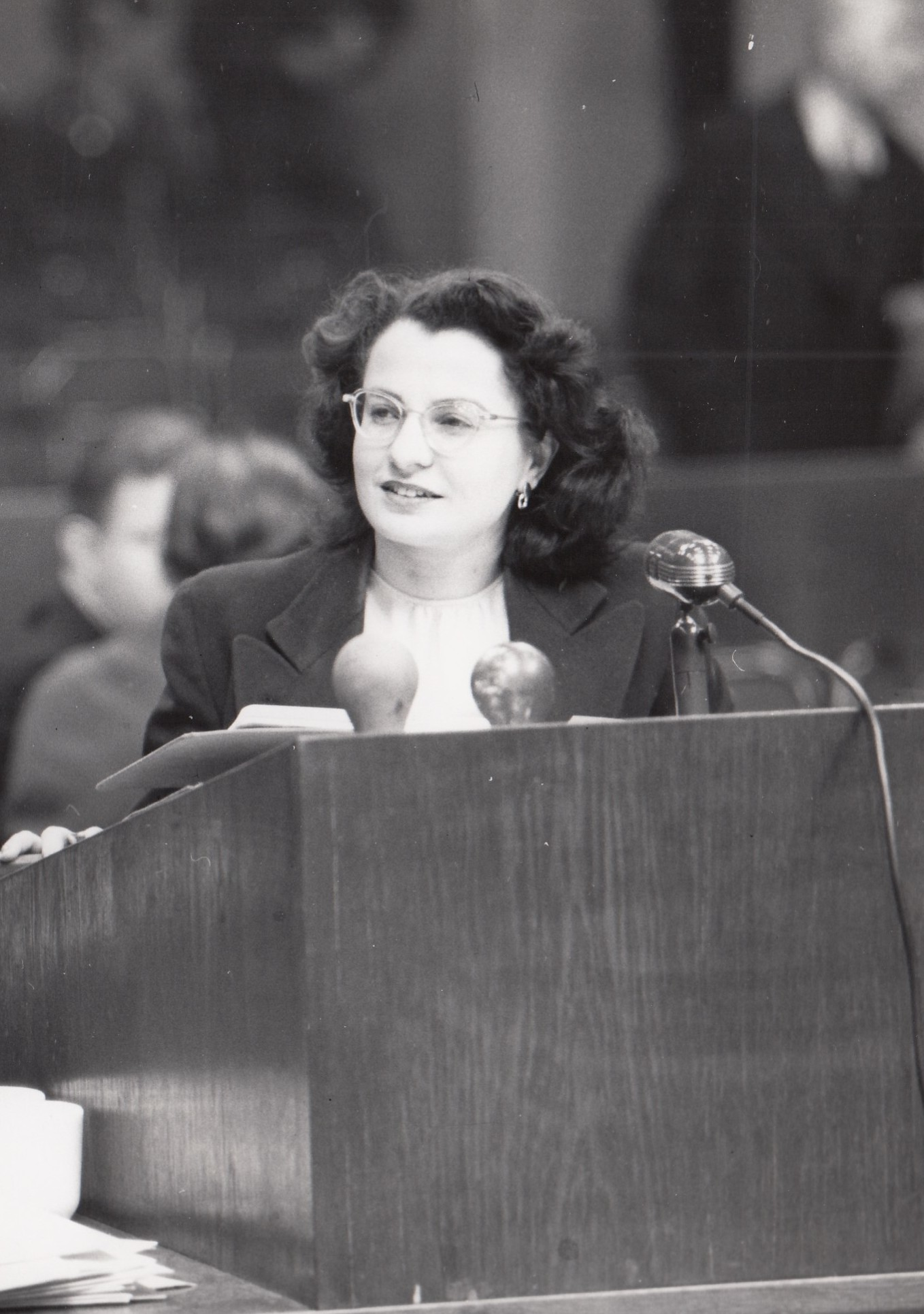
- Goetz delivering the opening statement at the Krupp trial, December 8, 1947

United States Bankruptcy Judge
- In office 1978–1993

Associate Counsel at Nuremberg
- In office 1946–1948

Personal details
- Born: September 30, 1917 New York City, New York, U.S.
- Died: January 26, 2004 (aged 86) West Palm Beach, Florida, U.S.
- Education: New York University (BA, LLB, LLM)

Cecelia Helen Goetz (September 30, 1917 – January 26, 2004) was an American lawyer and bankruptcy judge who served as a prosecutor at the Nuremberg trials.

== Early life ==
Goetz graduated from Textile High School in Chelsea, where she was editor-in-chief of the school paper. Goetz earned her law degree from New York University School of Law where she served as editor-in-chief of the New York University Law Review—the first woman named editor-in-chief of a major American law journal—and graduated as salutatorian in 1940. While in law school, she studied abroad at the Sorbonne. As of her graduation in 1940, she lived at 2015 Avenue I in Brooklyn.

== Nuremberg ==
After initially being rebuffed, Goetz took a job at the Department of Justice in the equivalent of today's Civil Division. She applied to serve as a Nuremberg prosecutor, was rebuffed again at the instance of the Department of War, but was eventually given a "waiver of disability" by Telford Taylor so she could serve. The "disability" was her gender. She had been offered a supervisor's role at Justice—the first woman to be given such an opportunity—but declined it in favor of work at Nuremberg.

She was first involved in the Flick Trial and then became Associate Counsel on the trial of Alfred Krupp, delivering the opening statement on December 8, 1947. She was one of four women on the Nuremberg prosecution team and, as Associate Counsel, she outranked six men. At the time, she observed that "[t]o get a decision in this case would, in my opinion, be a great step toward avoiding future wars." She would later describe her participation in the trials as "the most important work I have ever been involved in."

== Private practice and government ==
After Nuremberg, Goetz returned to the United States. She worked at her father Isidor Goetz's firm, Goetz & Goetz, and later became the first woman to serve as Assistant Chief Counsel to the Economic Stabilization Agency. She was later Special Assistant to the Attorney General in the Tax Division of the Department of Justice. In 1964, she was admitted to the partnership at Herzfeld & Rubin, a New York law firm.

== Judicial career ==
Goetz was appointed a United States Bankruptcy Judge in 1978, becoming the first woman to serve as Bankruptcy Judge in New York's Eastern District. Her chambers were in Happauge, New York. In the early 1990s, Goetz oversaw the bankruptcy proceedings of Braniff International Airways, which had filed under Chapter 11 in August 1991. She served until 1993, returning to Herzfeld & Rubin thereafter.

== Works ==
- Goetz, Cecelia H.; Hoenig, Michael (1974). "A Rational Approach to 'Crashworthy' Automobiles: The Need for Judicial Responsibility". Southwestern University Law Review. 6 (1): 1–87. ISSN 0886-3296 – via HeinOnline.
- Goetz, Cecelia H. (1980). "The Basic Rules of Antitrust Damages". Antitrust Law Journal. 49 (1): 125–140. ISSN 0003-6056. JSTOR 40840258.
- Goetz, Cecelia H. (1982). "Bankruptcy". Brooklyn Law Review. 48 (4): 821–44. ISSN 0007-2362 – via HeinOnline.
- Goetz, Cecelia H. (1982). "Consumer Bankruptcies: Should Ability-to-Pay Condition Bankruptcy Relief?". New York Law School Law Review. 27 (3): 705–744. ISSN 0145-448X – via HeinOnline.
- Goetz, Cecelia H. (1999). "Impressions of Telford Taylor at Nuremberg". Columbia Journal of Transnational Law. 37: 669–672. ISSN 0010-1931 – via HeinOnline.

== Sources ==
- Amann, Diane Marie (2011). "Cecelia Goetz, Woman at Nuremberg". International Criminal Law Review. 11 (3): 607–620. doi:10.1163/157181211X576456. ISSN 1567-536X. SSRN 1694855.
- Berry, Dawn Bradley (1996). The 50 Most Influential Women in American Law. Los Angeles: Lowell House. ISBN 9781565654693.
- Heller, Kevin Jon (2011). The Nuremberg Military Tribunals and the Origins of International Criminal Law. Oxford: Oxford University Press. doi:10.1093/acprof:oso/9780199554317.001.0001. hdl:1887/17757. ISBN 978-0-19-172862-4. OCLC 757401636.
- Morello, Karen Berger (1986). The Invisible Bar: The Woman Lawyer in America, 1638 to the Present. New York: Random House. ISBN 0-394-52964-2. OCLC 13269032 – via Internet Archive.
