= Humanities Preparatory Academy =

Public school in New York City

Location
- 351 West 18th Street New York, New York 10011
- Coordinates: 40°44′36″N 74°00′10″W

Information
- Type: Public (magnet) secondary Transfer school
- Established: 1997
- Principal: Jeannie Ferrari
- Faculty: 25
- Grades: 9–12
- Enrollment: 209
- Website: www.humanitiesprep.org

Humanities Preparatory Academy (also known as Humanities Prep) is an American public high school, located in the Chelsea district of Manhattan, New York City. The school sends over 99% of its students to four-year universities and private schools. Founded as a program in Bayard Rustin High School, it became a school in 1997.

Humanities Prep is part of a consortium of over 30 schools that have been exempted from taking all but the English Regents Examinations. Housed on the third floor of the Bayard Rustin Educational Complex, Humanities Prep offers very few places, and admissions to the school are very competitive. The school has a current enrollment of 209.

== Academics ==
Humanities students undertake a college preparatory curriculum, which allows all students to choose the classes they want. Teachers and departments have autonomy in curriculum design. The students are placed in small classes grouped heterogeneously by ability and age, including special education students, to encourage student-centered pedagogy. The school's teaching philosophy is that work is the basic medium of self-actualization and discovery; self-reflection and revision are prioritised, and significance is placed on multiple drafts and critique.

Unlike most New York public high schools, students at the academy do not take the Regents examination, except the English Regent. Instead, students are required to pass performance-based assessment tests (PBATs) in English, math, science, and history with at least an 80, after completing the course for the given subject. The school's PBATs are more difficult than the regents exam. Students are asked to write a paper in the subject area demonstrating their knowledge of the material. Students must acquire 44 credits in order to graduate. They are also encouraged to take college classes during their junior and senior years.

== Admissions ==
Priority is given to Manhattan residents. All transfer students must be referred by a guidance counselor and are then interviewed by the school when space is available.

== Notable alumni ==
- Liz Murray

== See also ==
- Education in New York City
