= Homeless to Harvard: The Liz Murray Story =

2003 television film by Peter Levin

- DVD cover
- Written by: Ronni Kern
- Directed by: Peter Levin
- Starring: Thora Birch; Michael Riley; Robert Bockstael; Makyla Smith; Kelly Lynch
- Composer: Louis Febre
- Country of origin: United States
- Original language: English

Production
- Producer: Michael Mahoney
- Cinematography: Uta Briesewitz
- Editor: Anita Brandt-Burgoyne
- Running time: 91 minutes

Original release
- Network: Lifetime
- Release: April 7, 2003

Homeless to Harvard: The Liz Murray Story is an American biographical drama television film based on the true story of Liz Murray, a homeless New York City teenager who was accepted into Harvard College. The film stars Thora Birch and was directed by Peter Levin. It premiered on Lifetime on April 7, 2003, and received three nominations at the 55th Primetime Emmy Awards, including Outstanding Made for Television Movie and Outstanding Lead Actress in a Miniseries or a Movie for Thora Birch.

== Plot ==
Liz Murray grows up in a dysfunctional home in The Bronx with her sister, Lisa, and drug-addicted parents who contracted HIV from shared needles. Their mother Jean is schizophrenic and nearly blind, and their father Peter Finnerty is intelligent but lacks social skills and conscientiousness. He watches Jeopardy! and knows all the questions. Their bathtub does not drain, and Liz stands on an overturned bucket when showering to stay out of the fetid water. She is eventually removed from this home and placed into the care system.

At 15, Liz moves in with her grandfather Pops, along with her sister and mother. Pops had previously sexually abused Liz's aunt. When he hits Liz during a fight, she runs away from home with a female classmate named Chris who was abused at home.

Liz's mother dies of AIDS, which gives her a "slap in the face" and a sense of motivation. She becomes a star student, completing high school in just two years rather than the usual four, and earns a scholarship to Harvard College through an essay contest sponsored by The New York Times.

== Cast ==
- Thora Birch as Elizabeth "Liz" Murray
  - Jennifer Pisana as Young Liz Murray
- Michael Riley as Peter Finnerty
- Robert Bockstael as David
- Makyla Smith as Chris
- Kelly Lynch as Jean Murray
- Aron Tager as Pops Murray
- Marla McLean as Lisa Murray
  - Elliot Page (Note: Credited as Ellen Page; he came out as transgender in 2020.) as Young Lisa Murray
- Marguerite McNeil as Eva
- Amber Godfrey as Dawn
- Seamus Morrison as Bobby
- John Fulton as Old Irish Cop
- Réjean Cournoyer as Young Irish Cop
- Mauralea Austin as Miss Wanda
- Cecil Wright as Mr. Maki

== Reception ==
=== Awards and nominations ===
2003 Emmy Awards

- Nominated: Outstanding Lead Actress in a Miniseries or a Movie — Thora Birch
- Nominated: Outstanding Made for Television Movie
- Nominated: Outstanding Single Camera Picture Editing for a Miniseries, Movie or a Special — Anita Brandt-Burgoyne

2003 Casting Society of America (Artios)

- Nominated - Best Casting for TV Movie of the Week — Susan Edelman

2004 American Cinema Editors (Eddies)

- Won - Best Edited Miniseries or Movie for Commercial Television — Anita Brandt-Burgoyne
