= Winter of Frozen Dreams =

- Directed by: Eric Mandelbaum
- Screenplay by: Michael Caughill; Michael Graf; John Besmer; Eric Mandelbaum
- Based on: Winter of Frozen Dreams by Karl Harter
- Produced by: Omar Peraza; Milka Stanisic; Millie Stanisic; Anthony J. Vorhies
- Starring: Thora Birch; Keith Carradine; Brendan Sexton III; Leo Fitzpatrick; Dean Winters
- Cinematography: Brian O'Carroll
- Edited by: Egon Kirincic
- Music by: Kenneth Lampl
- Production companies: Em & Me Productions; King Isthmus Films
- Distributed by: Monterey Media
- Release date: April 4, 2009 (Wisconsin Film Festival)
- Running time: 92 minutes
- Country: United States
- Language: English
- Budget: $1 million
- Box office: $8,321

Winter of Frozen Dreams is a 2009 independent American crime drama film directed by Eric Mandelbaum, and starring Thora Birch, Keith Carradine, and Brendan Sexton III. The film follows the story of Barbara Hoffman, a Wisconsin biochemistry student and prostitute convicted of murder in the first televised murder trial ever.

== Cast ==
- Thora Birch as Barbara Hoffman
- Dan Moran as Harry Berge
- Brendan Sexton III as Jerry Davies
- Dean Winters as Ken Curtis
- Keith Carradine as Detective Lulling
- Colleen Camp as Jerry's Mother
- William Swan as Judge

== Production ==
Jack Birch, Thora Birch's father and manager, insisted on being present on the closed set of this movie to watch the filming of her sex scenes with Dean Winters.

== Reception ==
Released on DVD on March 31, 2009, Winter of Frozen Dreams got reviewed by DVD Talk who stated that "[the film] suffers from that most severe of cinematic situations. It wastes opportunities and does its real life saga no favors".

John Marrone of Bloody Disgusting wrote "While it sure is watchable and no less worse than the prime time crap you find on the three TV major stations during the week, it leaves you very confused".
