= Thora Birch =

American actress (born 1982)

- Birch on the red carpet for 2026 MPTF Emmy fundraiser
- Born: March 11, 1982 (age 44); Los Angeles, California, U.S.
- Occupation: Actress
- Years active: 1988–present
- Spouse: Michael Benton Adler (m. 2018)
- Parent(s): Jack Birch (father); Carol Connors (mother)

Signature
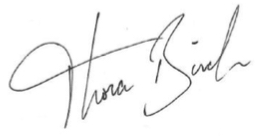

Thora Birch (born March 11, 1982) is an American actress. She made her film debut with a starring role in Purple People Eater (1988) and won a Young Artist Award for "Best Actress Under Nine Years of Age". Birch rose to prominence as a child star during the 1990s through a string of parts in films, such as Paradise (1991), Patriot Games (1992), Hocus Pocus (1993), Monkey Trouble (1994), Now and Then (1995), and Alaska (1996). Her breakthrough into adult-oriented roles came with her portrayal of Jane Burnham in American Beauty (1999), for which she was nominated for the BAFTA for Best Supporting Actress.

Birch received further acclaim—and a Golden Globe nomination for Best Actress—for starring as Enid Coleslaw in the cult hit Ghost World (2001). Her other film credits during the 2000s included Dungeons & Dragons (2000), The Hole (2001), Silver City (2004), and Dark Corners (2006). Birch took a break from acting after producing and starring in Petunia (2012). She returned in 2016 and has since appeared in various independent films, such as The Last Black Man in San Francisco (2019) and The Chronology of Water (2025).

On television, Birch played the title role in Homeless to Harvard: The Liz Murray Story—for which she received an Emmy nomination—and the recurring role of Gamma / Mary on The Walking Dead (2019–2020). She made her directorial debut with the Lifetime film The Gabby Petito Story.

== Early life ==
Birch was born in Los Angeles, California to Jack Birch and Carol Connors, ex-pornographic film actors who both appeared in the 1972 cult classic, Deep Throat. She is of German-Jewish, Italian, Scandinavian, and French-Canadian ancestry. Her forename is derived from that of Norse god of thunder and lightning, "Thor", which would have been her name if she had been born a boy. She has a younger brother, Bolt.

Because of their own experiences with the entertainment industry, Birch's parents were reluctant to encourage her to act, but were persuaded to show Birch's photograph to talent agents by a babysitter who noticed her imitating commercials. Birch got her first big break at the age of four, when the babysitter accompanied her to a successful audition for a Quaker Oats commercial.

== Career ==
=== 1988–1998: Television work and film breakthrough ===
Birch appeared in commercials in the late 1980s for Burger King, California Raisins, Quaker Oats, and Vlasic Pickles. She made her film debut as Molly Johnson in the 1988 science fiction comedy Purple People Eater, for which she won a Young Artist Award in the category of "Best Young Actress Under Nine Years of Age". That same year, she guest-starred in an episode of Doogie Howser, M.D., and was cast in the regular role of Molly on the NBC sitcom Day By Day. The show ran for two seasons, earning Birch a further two Young Artist nominations.

In 1990, Birch was cast in a principal role on Parenthood, a sitcom based on the 1989 film of the same name, which ran for a single season on NBC. Birch had a supporting role in the 1991 drama Paradise, with Roger Ebert stating in his review for the Chicago Sun-Times that she performed the role with "strong, simple charm". That same year, she starred in the Christmas film All I Want for Christmas, as a girl helping her divorced parents reunite with each other. The film was a moderate financial success, but found an audience on television and home video in subsequent years. Birch played the daughter of Jack Ryan in the spy thriller Patriot Games (1992), a commercial success which grossed US$178 million at the worldwide box office.

At age 11, Birch starred in the Halloween-set fantasy film Hocus Pocus (1993), playing the younger sister of a teenage boy who inadvertently revives a trio of witches. Making US$39 million in the U.S. (against a budget of US$28 million), the film was not considered a financial success upon release, but quickly developed a sizeable cult following due to strong home video sales and television re-runs. "I think the most surreal thing is that it keeps getting more popular instead of the other way around", Birch later said, while admitting the experience was "the most amount of fun I've ever had on a set".

In the 1994 comedy Monkey Trouble, Birch played a girl who befriends a Capuchin monkey. In a positive review for the Austin Chronicle, Marjorie Baumgarten observed that Birch's "nuanced performance (a rarity amongst child performers) no doubt lends [the film] its realistic touch". That same year, she reprised her role in the sequel set after Patriot Games, Clear and Present Danger, which grossed over US$215 million globally. She was then cast as "Teeny" Tercell in the 1995 coming-of-age drama, Now and Then. The film was largely dismissed by critics upon release, but has since been recognised as a milestone of its genre. Next, Birch headlined the adventure film Alaska (1996), playing one of two siblings who cross the Alaskan wilderness in search of their lost father. The Austin Chronicle found it to be a "decent kids' adventure movie" with an "impeccable" performance by Birch. For the next two years, she did not appear on films, but guest-starred in episodes of Promised Land and Touched by an Angel.

=== 1999–2003: Transition to adult roles ===
Birch appeared in several projects in 1999: firstly, the made-for-television film Night Ride Home, where she played a teenager grieving the loss of her older brother. Writing for Variety, David Kronke called it "a thoughtful and sensitive examination of how a family copes with grief", while saying of the performances, "De Mornay [...] digs deep and comes up with a character that seems true; Burstyn and Birch competently complement [her]". Next, she played the small, uncredited role of Mary in Anywhere but Here.

Birch's portrayal for the insecure teenage daughter in American Beauty, Sam Mendes's dark dramedy about the struggles of a middle-class household, was roundly praised by critics, with Peter Travers of Rolling Stone writing that she "[glimmered] with grown-up radiance". The performance earned her a BAFTA nomination for Best Supporting Actress, while the film was the recipient of the 1999 Academy Award for Best Picture and grossed over US$356 million worldwide, emerging as the biggest commercial success of Birch's career to date. She later said of the experience, "There was a lot of therapy involved [...] A lot of opening up and sharing things from our own lives about why we related to these characters. Everybody brought a lot of themselves to it. I know Annette did a lot of research about women becoming obsessed with the self-help realm. Kevin was working out obsessively and already in the headspace of [his character] Lester, even in rehearsals. And then there was Wes, Mena and I, who were these kids just incredibly excited to be there and watching [these] masters at their craft — just trying to absorb as much as we could from them".

Birch starred in two films released in 2000: low-budget drama The Smokers, in which she was called "a scene-stealer" by The Hollywood Reporter, and Dungeons & Dragons, a poorly-received adaptation of the fantasy role-playing game of the same name. British horror film The Hole came next, where she starred as Liz, a devious schoolgirl who lures a group of her friends into an underground bunker. In a mixed review for Variety, Derek Elley stated that Birch gave "an effectively creepy lead [performance]", but called the film "clunky" in its "attempt to merge the psychothriller and teen movie genres".

Birch's next project was the satirical 2001 comedy Ghost World, directed by Terry Zwigoff. Based on the graphic novel of the same name, the film was released to an enthusiastic critical reception and developed a loyal cult following. James Berardinelli found Birch's part to be her "first effectively developed role" since American Beauty, commending the actress for the "quirkiness [and the] underlying sense of melancholy and ennui" in her portrayal of Enid Coleslaw. Meanwhile, A. O. Scott said in his appraisal for The New York Times:

Thora Birch, whose performance as Lester Burnham's alienated daughter was the best thing about American Beauty, plays a similar character here, with even more intelligence and restraint. Enid's capacity for scorn is unlimited: her plucked eyebrows might illustrate a dictionary entry for "supercilious," and her quiet voice shoots darts of sarcasm in every direction.

Birch received various accolades for Ghost World, including a nomination for the 2002 Golden Globe Award for Best Actress.

In 2003, she appeared as the title character in the biographical television film Homeless to Harvard: The Liz Murray Story, starring as a young woman who, after becoming homeless at 15 amid personal tragedies, decides to finish her schooling. Birch's performance earned her a nomination for the Emmy Award for Outstanding Lead Actress that year.

=== 2004–2012: Independent films ===
Birch had a supporting role in Silver City, a political satire directed by John Sayles, which premiered at the 2004 Cannes Film Festival. The independent feature received mixed reviews, but Empire's Angie Errigo thought Birch's portrayal of whistleblower Karen Cross was "terrific". She co-starred in the crime drama Slingshot (2005) the following year, with Variety stating that her "standout" performance "commands attention".

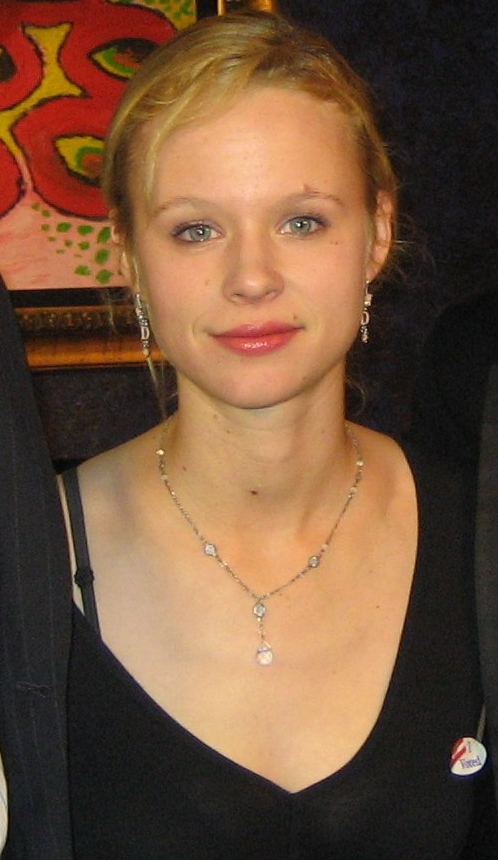
Birch appearing as a guest on Tom Green Live! in 2006

In Dark Corners (2006), a psychological horror-thriller about a young woman who wakes up one day as a different person, Birch starred in the dual role of Susan Hamilton and Karen Clarke. The film received a mixed reception, with Adam DiLeo of IGN praising its surreal, David Lynch-style elements, but criticizing Birch's performance. She followed this with roles in two more genre films: Train—a slasher film about a group of college wrestlers who fall victim to a violent gang of thieves, released in 2008—and the psychological thriller Deadline, in which she co-starred with Brittany Murphy, who died shortly after the film's release in December 2009. Birch later revealed she had been concerned about Murphy's wellbeing during filming.

In the true crime drama Winter of Frozen Dreams (2009), Birch played Barbara Hoffman, a Wisconsin prostitute convicted of murder in the first-ever televised murder trial. In a review for Bloody Disgusting, John Marrone described Birch's "alluring" performance as the highlight of the film. Next, she took on the role of journalist Sidney Bloom in The Pregnancy Pact, a Lifetime movie based on the true story of a group of high schoolers in Gloucester, Massachusetts, who plotted to get pregnant at the same time and raise their children communally. The film was watched by 5.9 million viewers when it premiered in January 2010. Later that year, Birch was cast—in what would have been her stage debut—as Lucy in the off-Broadway revival of Hamilton Deane's Dracula, but was subsequently dismissed from the production for the alleged behavior of her father—her manager at the time—who was reported to have physically threatened one of the show's cast members during a rehearsal.

Birch played the role of Vivian in Petunia (2012), an independent dramedy depicting the lives and romantic relationships of a dysfunctional New York family. Her first outing as a producer, she described the "intimate [and] honest" feature as "a little bit different". Given a small theatrical release in the U.S., the film garnered mixed reviews, though Birch and the rest of the ensemble were praised.

=== 2013–present: Break from acting, subsequent return, and directorial debut ===
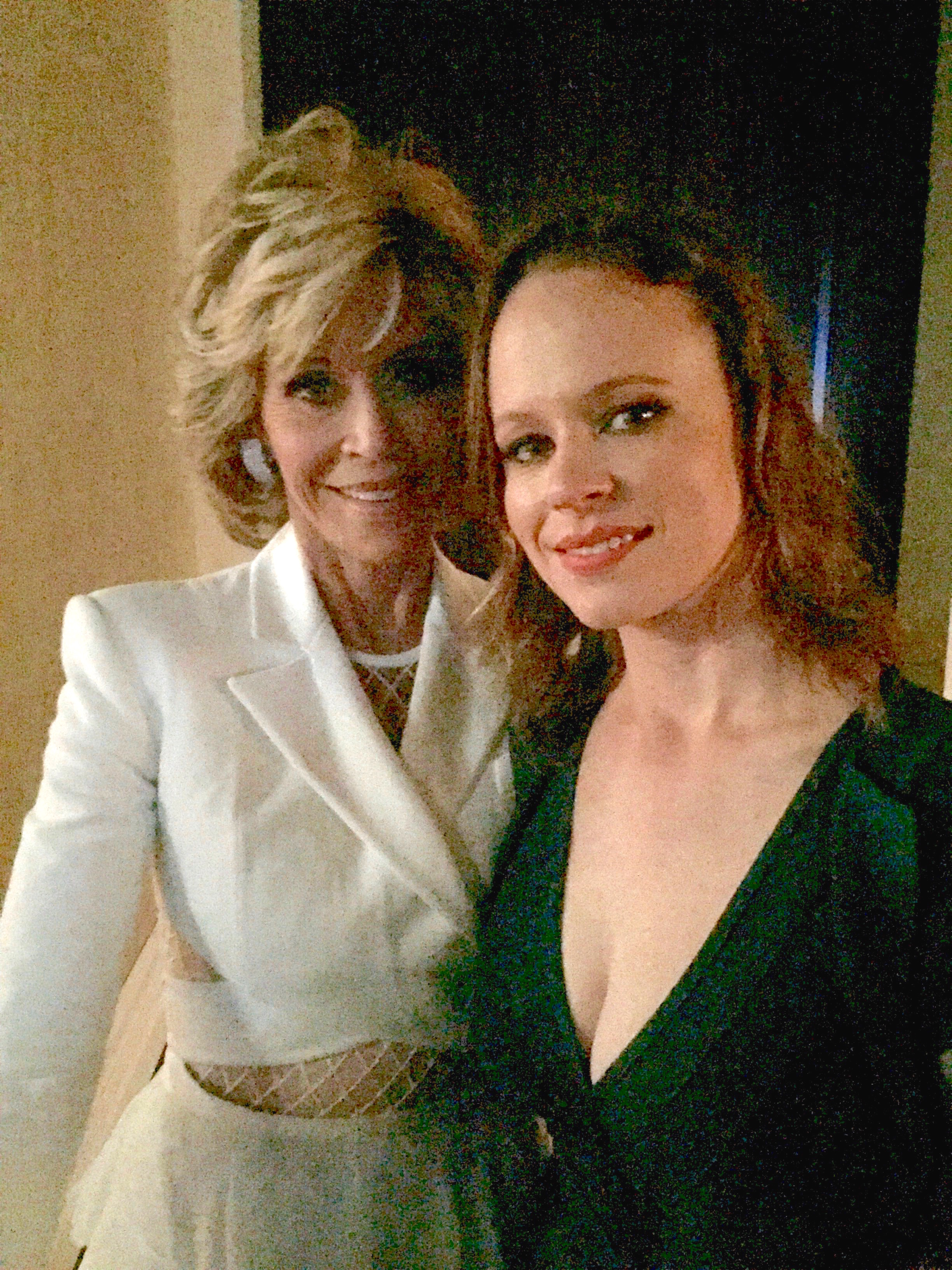
Birch (right) with Jane Fonda at the 2015 Hollywood Film Awards

After devoting herself to academic pursuits, which included securing a degree in legal studies through Kaplan University, Birch returned to acting in 2015 with a recurring role as software engineer Morgan on the first season of the USA Network sci-fi drama series, Colony. It was later revealed that Birch would not return for the second season because of a scheduling conflict, with the part being recast.

Birch starred as a left-wing activist in the 2018 political thriller Affairs of State, which Noel Murray of The Los Angeles Times called "refreshingly smart". In a less favorable review for Forbes, Luke Y. Thompson wrote, "[cinematographer] Horacio Marquinez gamely films everything like it's an art movie, though there's one scene in which he shoots Birch so unflatteringly that you wonder what she must have done to make him mad". She headlined and co-produced The Competition that same year, an independent romantic comedy.

Next, Birch starred in the 2018 drama The Etruscan Smile—an adaptation of José Luis Sampedro's novel—which was filmed in Scotland and received strong reviews. The following year, she played a supporting role in the crime thriller Above Suspicion, which—after Patriot Games and Clear and Present Danger in the 1990s—marked her third collaboration with director Phillip Noyce. In a positive review for The Guardian, Peter Bradshaw commented, "There's an interesting cameo from Thora Birch [as the] long-suffering Jolene".

Birch's appearance in The Last Black Man in San Francisco (2019), a drama about a young man's pursuit to reclaim the Victorian home built by his grandfather, was considered a crucial part of the film's success. Speaking of her casting and the symbolic nature of the part, director Joe Talbot said:

Thora is one of the great actresses of her generation and her work, in part, inspired me to want to make films. Her performance in Ghost World made me feel seen as a teenager when I was a bit lost. At the end of that film, [she] rides a bus off into the sunset. In our film, we meet her character on a bus in the heart of San Francisco—almost as if she kept riding it all these years, and somehow wound up in the Bay Area working a tech job she loathed. Her exchange that follows with [main character] Jimmie, however brief, has been written about and quoted more than any other part of the film.

The film premiered at the 2019 Sundance Film Festival, where it won awards for Best Directing and a Special Jury Prize for Creative Collaboration. It was released by A24 in the United States.

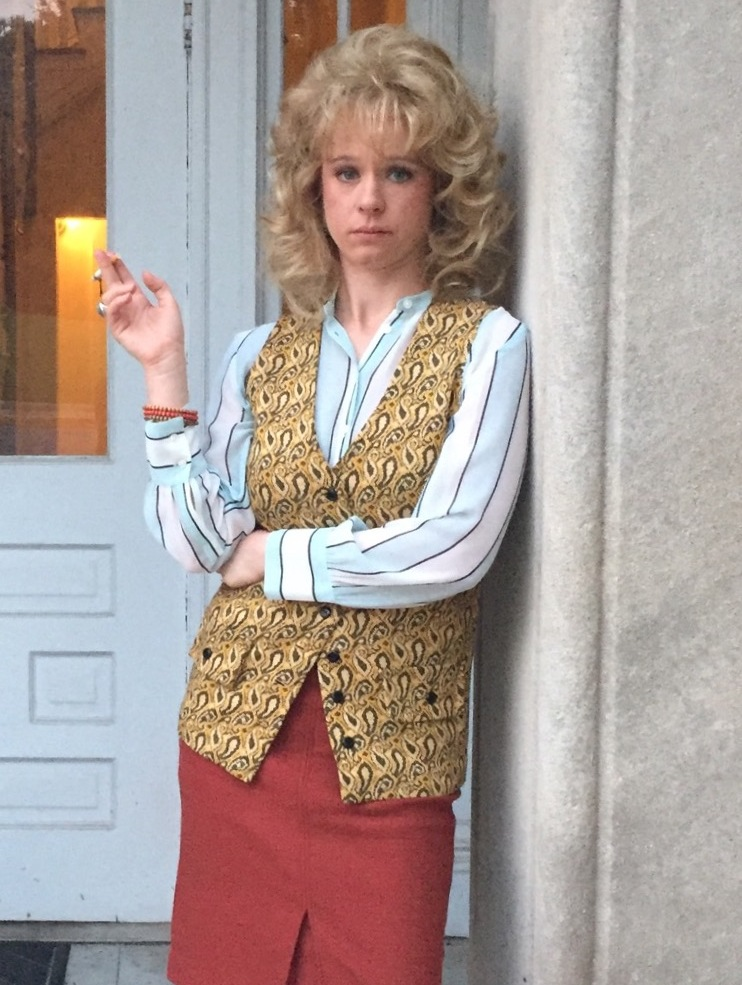
Birch as Jolene on the set of Above Suspicion (2019)

Between 2019 and 2020, Birch appeared in the role of Mary—aka "Gamma"—on the tenth season of AMC's post-apocalyptic horror series, The Walking Dead, with Collider commenting that she brought "emotional depth" to the part. Birch called the experience "a fun, massive thing to have been a part of". Next, in the independent drama 13 Minutes (2021), she played a single mother struggling to keep her family together in the wake of a destructive tornado. Rex Reed of The New York Observer felt that the film succeeded on the strength of its "compelling" and "likable" ensemble, singling out Birch as a highlight.

Birch made her directorial debut in 2022 with The Gabby Petito Story, a Lifetime television movie in which she also co-starred. The film is based on the 2021 disappearance of Petito, a 22-year-old who was murdered by her boyfriend during a cross-country drive. Birch said she had been wanting to direct since she was "nine or ten years old" and that it was the subject matter which drew her to the project: "There's an element of abusive relationships in this story that I think so many of us can relate to. Within five seconds, this story captured the entire nation's attention in the middle of Covid [...] Everyone stopped and took a minute and [said], "Where’s Gabby? What happened to Gabby?" That kind of fascination and focus point was something that I thought was a third character in [the] story". The ethical nature of dramatizing such recent events was met with public criticism, especially as the film—which premiered on October 12, 2022, just over one year after Petito's death—was made without the involvement of the Petito family.

Also in 2022, Birch played Audrey Beach in the ten-part fictional podcast Overleaper, an espionage-style thriller about a female soldier embarking on a top-secret mission. Birch said it was the idea of "a return to the old radio dramas [from the 1920s and '30s]", as well as the luxury of acting with her voice and not having to endure "the harsh physical positions that the character is in", which drew her to the project.

It was announced at the 2023 Cannes Film Festival that Birch's next project as director—her feature debut—would be an adaptation of Elmore Leonard's novel Mr. Paradise, making her the first woman to direct a Leonard adaptation. As of 2025, the project has yet to materialise.

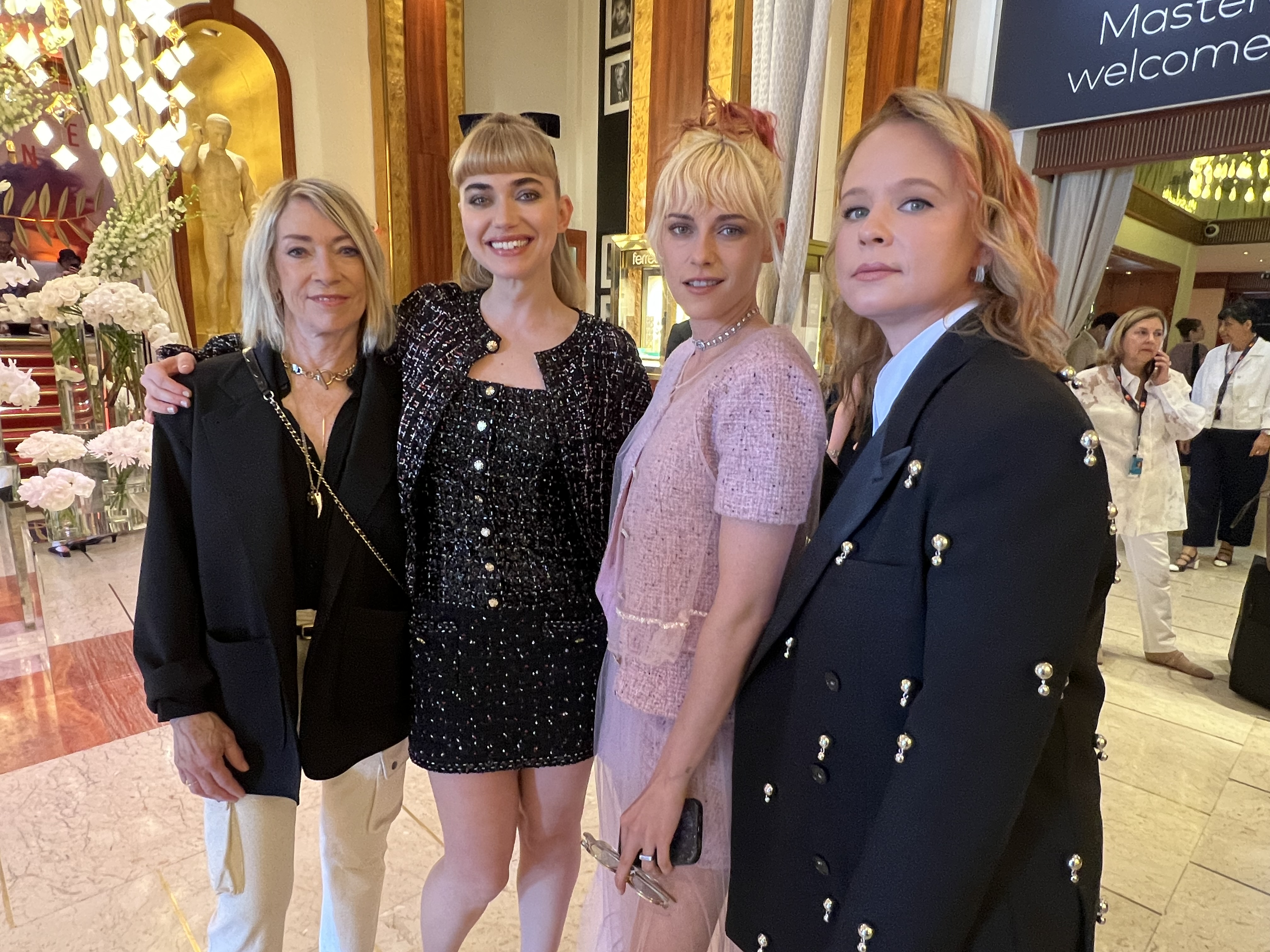
Birch (far right) promoting The Chronology of Water (2025) at the Cannes Film Festival

Birch's supporting role in the 2025 drama The Chronology of Water, the directorial debut of Kristen Stewart, received praise from critics, with Clayton Davis of Variety commenting, "Birch brings a weary resilience to her [portrayal of Claudia]. She doesn't beg for the audience's empathy. In [one particular] scene [she] executes a quiet, unflinching [heartbreak], something her character only reveals in faint and blurry reminders of her early life, how much she's buried and how survival can look like silence. It's a turn that hopefully will result in a triumphant new act for Birch, serving not just as a comeback, but as a new beginning". He added that Birch's relatively brief screen time "doesn't make her performance any less deserving" of awards recognition.

== Personal life ==
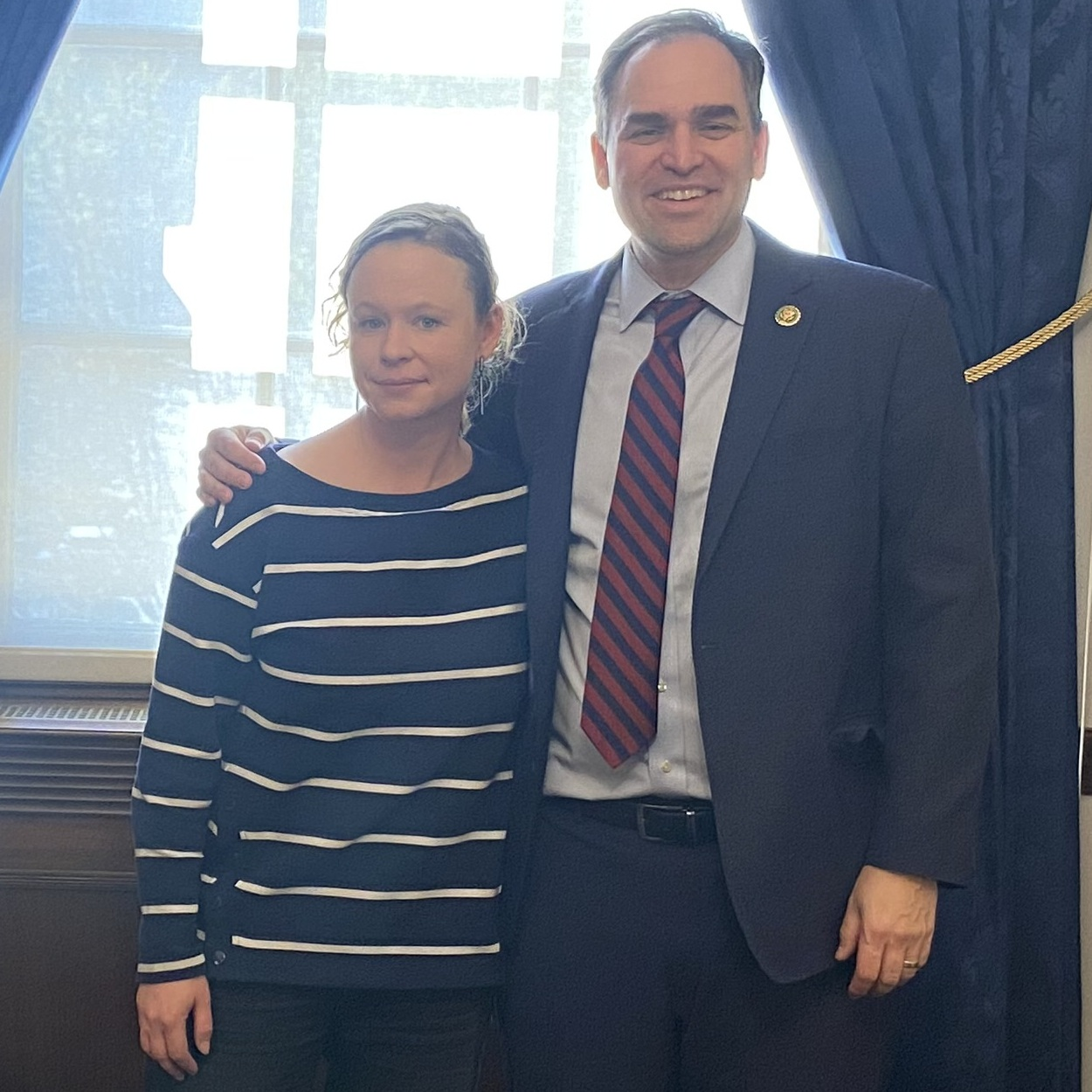
Birch (left) with Wiley Nickel in 2023

Birch married talent manager Michael Benton Adler on December 21, 2018.

Birch is a long-time Democrat. She was a delegate at the 2012 Democratic National Convention. She has supported Joe Biden and local political efforts, such as Congressman Wiley Nickel's campaign.

Birch came out as bisexual in a 2026 interview with Us Weekly.

== Filmography ==
Key
†	Denotes films that have not yet been released

=== Film ===
Year	Title	Role	Notes
1988	Purple People Eater	Molly Johnson	
1991	Paradise	Billie Pike	
1991	All I Want for Christmas	Hallie O'Fallon	
1992	Patriot Games	Sally Ryan	
1992	Itsy Bitsy Spider	Leslie McGroarty (voice)	Short film
1993	Hocus Pocus	Dani Dennison	
1994	Monkey Trouble	Eva Gregory	
1994	Clear and Present Danger	Sally Ryan	
1995	Now and Then	Tina "Teeny" Tercell	
1996	Alaska	Jessie Barnes	
1999	American Beauty	Jane Burnham	
1999	Anywhere but Here	Mary	Uncredited
2000	The Smokers	Lincoln Roth	
2000	Dungeons & Dragons	Empress Savina	
2001	The Hole	Elizabeth "Liz" Dunn	
2001	Ghost World	Enid Coleslaw	
2004	Silver City	Karen Cross	
2004	The Dot	Narrator (voice)	Short film
2005	Slingshot	April	
2006	Dark Corners	Susan Hamilton / Karen Clarke	
2008	Train	Alexandra "Alex" Roper	
2009	Winter of Frozen Dreams	Barbara Hoffman	
2009	Deadline	Lucy Woods	
2012	Petunia	Vivian Petunia	
2018	The Etruscan Smile	Emily	
2018	The Competition	Lauren	
2018	Affairs of State	Callie	
2019	The Last Black Man in San Francisco	Becca	
2019	Kindred Spirits	Chloe	
2019	Above Suspicion	Jolene	
2021	13 Minutes	Jess	
2024	The Midway Point	Cristina	
2025	The Chronology of Water	Claudia	
TBA	The Last Seder †		Post-production

=== Television ===
Year	Title	Role	Notes
1988–1989	Day by Day	Molly	Recurring; 21 episodes
1989	Doogie Howser, M.D.	Megan	Episode: "Vinnie Video Vici"
1990	Dark Avenger	Susie Donovan	Television film
1990	Married People	Emily	Episode: "To Live and Drive in New York"
1990–1991	Parenthood	Taylor Buckman	Main cast; 12 episodes
1991	Amen	Brittany	Episode: "Nothing Says Lovin'..."
1994	Monty	Ann Sherman	Episode: "Here Comes the Son"
1995	The Outer Limits	Aggie Travers	Episode: "The Choice"
1997	Promised Land	Allison Rhodes	Episode: "Running Scared"
1997	Touched by an Angel	Erin	Episode: "The Pact"
1999	Night Ride Home	Clea Mahler	Television film
2002	Night Visions	Susan Thornhill	Episode: "The Maze"
2003	Homeless to Harvard: The Liz Murray Story	Elizabeth "Liz" Murray	Television film
2005	My Life as a Teenage Robot	Vega (voice)	Episode: "Escape from Cluster Prime"
2010	The Pregnancy Pact	Sidney Bloom	Television film
2016	Colony	Morgan	Recurring; 2 episodes
2019–2020	The Walking Dead	Gamma / Mary	Recurring; 9 episodes
2022	The Gabby Petito Story	Nichole Schmidt	Television film (also director)
2025	Mayfair Witches	Gifford Mayfair	Episode: "Ten of Swords"

=== Podcasts ===
Year	Title	Role	Notes
2022	Overleaper	Audrey Beach	Main role / Narrator

=== Music videos ===
Year	Song	Artist	Notes
2002	"We Are All Made of Stars"	Moby	Directed by Joseph Kahn
2003	"Eat You Alive"	Limp Bizkit	Directed by Fred Durst

== Awards and nominations ==
Selected accolades for Thora Birch
Year (Note: Indicates the year of ceremony. Each year is linked to the article about the awards held that year, wherever possible.)	Award	Category	Work	Result
1989	Young Artist Award	Best Actress Under Nine	Purple People Eater	Won
1992	Young Artist Award	Best Actress in a Motion Picture	Paradise	Won
1994	Young Artist Award	Best Actress in a Motion Picture Comedy	Hocus Pocus	Won
1999	San Diego Film Critics Society Award	Best Supporting Actress	American Beauty	Won
2000	Blockbuster Entertainment Award	Favorite Supporting Actress – Drama	American Beauty	Nominated
2000	British Academy Film Award	Best Supporting Actress	American Beauty	Nominated
2000	Online Film Critics Society Award	Best Supporting Actress	American Beauty	Nominated
2000	Screen Actors Guild Award	Outstanding Cast in a Motion Picture (shared with the cast)	American Beauty	Won
2000	Young Artist Award	Best Supporting Actress in a Feature Film	American Beauty	Won
2000	Young Hollywood Award	Best On-Screen Chemistry (shared with Wes Bentley)	American Beauty	Won
2000	YoungStar Award	Best Actress in a Motion Picture Drama	American Beauty	Won
2001	Deauville Film Festival Award	Acting Prize	Ghost World	Won
2001	San Diego Film Critics Society Award	Best Actress	Ghost World	Won
2001	Golden Space Needle Award	Best Actress	Ghost World	Won
2001	Toronto Film Critics Association Award	Best Female Performance	Ghost World	Won
2002	Chicago Film Critics Association Award	Best Actress	Ghost World	Nominated
2002	Golden Globe Award	Best Actress in a Motion Picture — Comedy or Musical	Ghost World	Nominated
2002	MTV Movie Award	Best Line	Ghost World	Nominated
2002	MTV Movie Award	Best Dressed	Ghost World	Nominated
2002	Online Film Critics Society Award	Best Actress	Ghost World	Nominated
2002	Satellite Award	Best Actress in a Motion Picture — Comedy or Musical	Ghost World	Nominated
2002	Genre Face of the Future Award	Female	Ghost World	Nominated (also for Dungeons & Dragons)
2002	Vancouver Film Critics Circle Award	Best Actress	Ghost World	Nominated
2003	DVD Premiere Award	Best Supporting Actress	The Smokers	Nominated
2003	Primetime Emmy Award	Outstanding Lead Actress in a Miniseries or Movie	Homeless to Harvard: The Liz Murray Story	Nominated
2004	Prism Awards	Performance in a TV Movie or Miniseries	Homeless to Harvard: The Liz Murray Story	Won
2018	Boston Film Festival Prize	Best Ensemble Cast (shared with the cast)	The Etruscan Smile	Won
