= William Swan (actor) =

American film, stage and television actor

- Swan (right) with James Gregory in The Lawless Years, 1959
- Born: William H. Swan; February 6, 1928; Amherst, New York, U.S.
- Died: January 20, 2019 (aged 90); Lee, Massachusetts, U.S.
- Occupations: Film, stage and television actor
- Partner: Richard D. Dunlap

William H. Swan (February 6, 1928 – January 20, 2019) was an American film, stage and television actor. He was best known for playing Walter Hines in the American soap opera television series All My Children.

== Life and career ==
Swan was born in Amherst, New York, the son of Earl Swan and Irene Hall. After graduating from high school, he served in the United States Army in Italy during World War II, which after his discharge, he acted on summer stock theaters. He began his screen career in 1954, appearing in the CBS television series Rod Brown of the Rocket Rangers. In the same year, he appeared in the NBC anthology drama television series Kraft Television Theatre.

Later in his career, Swan guest-starred in television programs including The Twilight Zone, Have Gun – Will Travel, Barnaby Jones, 12 O'Clock High, Perry Mason, The Streets of San Francisco, 26 Men and One Step Beyond. He played Walter Hines in the ABC soap opera television series All My Children. He also appeared in films such as Lady in a Cage, The Parallax View, The Monster That Challenged the World, Hotel and Magnum Force. During his screen career, he performed at the Berkshire Playhouse in Massachusetts.

Swan retired from acting in 2009, last appearing in the film Winter of Frozen Dreams.

== Death ==
Swan died on January 20, 2019, in Lee, Massachusetts, at the age of 90.
