= List of covers of Time magazine (1970s) =

This is a list of people and other topics appearing on the cover of Time magazine in the 1970s. Time was first published in 1923. As Time became established as one of the United States' leading news magazines, an appearance on the cover of Time became an indicator of notability, fame or notoriety. Such features were accompanied by articles.

For the first time since 1960, all of the issues had been back to its standard Monday scheduled time frame.

For other decades, see Lists of covers of Time magazine.

== 1970 ==
- January 5 – Middle Americans, Time Man and Woman of the Year
- January 12 – The Band
- January 19 – Najeeb Halaby
- January 26 – Biafra: End of a Rebellion
- February 2 – Barry Commoner
- February 9 – The American Indian
- February 16 – Jane, Henry & Peter Fonda
- February 23 – Anita Caspary & James Shannon
- March 2 – Japan's Expo '70
- March 9 – Integration
- March 16 – Heroin Hits the Young
- March 23 – Inefficient America
- March 30 – U.S. Postal Strike
- April 6 – Jesse Jackson
- April 13 – Günter Grass
- April 20 – Richard Nixon
- April 27 – Astronauts Lovell, Haise & Swigert
- May 4 – Leonid Brezhnev
- May 11 – Cambodian Invasion
- May 18 – U.S. Student Protest
- May 25 – William Masters & Virginia Johnson
- June 1 – Arthur Burns
- June 8 – Richard Nixon, Henry Kissinger, John N. Mitchell, John Ehrlichman & H. R. Haldeman
- June 15 – Mike Nichols
- June 22 – Middle East Turmoil
- June 29 – Edward Heath
- July 6 – Fight over the Flag
- July 13 – Jerry Vernon Wilson
- July 20 – Henry Ford II
- July 27 – Alaska
- August 3 – Aged in America
- August 10 – William P. Rogers
- August 17 – Generation Gap
- August 24 – Howard Stein
- August 31 – Kate Millett
- September 7 – Elliott Gould
- September 14 – John Fairchild
- September 21 – Dawson's Field hijackings
- September 28 – The Arab Guerillas
- October 5 – Richard Nixon
- October 12 – Gamal Abdel Nasser
- October 19 – Salvador Allende
- October 26 – Battle for the Senate
- November 2 – The Urban Guerillas
- November 9 – Blue Collar Power
- November 16 – Adlai Stevenson III, John V. Tunney, James L. Buckley & Bill Brock
- November 23 – Big Bird
- November 30 – Martha Mitchell
- December 7 – American POWs
- December 14 – U.S. Inflation
- December 21 – Elmo Zumwalt
- December 28 – The U.S. Family

== 1971 ==
- January 4 – Willy Brandt, Man of the Year
- January 11 – Ali MacGraw
- January 18 – U.S. Prisons
- January 25 – Philip & Daniel Berrigan
- February 1 – Carl Albert
- February 8 – The Welfare Maze
- February 15 – Creighton Abrams
- February 22 – The Cooling of America
- March 1 – James Taylor
- March 8 – Joe Frazier & Muhammad Ali
- March 15 – Suburbia
- March 22 – George C. Scott
- March 29 – Konstantin Katushev, Kirill Mazurov, Leonid Brezhnev, Alexander Shelepin & Dmitry Polyansky
- April 5 – Aerospace Industry
- April 12 – William Calley
- April 19 – The New Genetics
- April 26 – Yanks in Peking
- May 3 – Alexis Smith
- May 10 – Akio Morita
- May 17 – Anwar Sadat
- May 24 – The Graduate, 1971
- May 31 – Jimmy Carter
- June 7 – Dick Cavett
- June 14 – Eddie Cox and Tricia Nixon
- June 21 – The Jesus Revolution
- June 28 – The Pentagon Papers
- July 5 – Daniel Ellsberg
- July 12 – Joe Colombo
- July 19 – Lee Trevino
- July 26 – Henry Kissinger & Richard Nixon
- August 2 – Pakistan Refugees
- August 9 – David Scott, James Irwin & Alfred Worden
- August 16 – George Shultz & Arthur Burns
- August 23 – Vida Blue
- August 30 – Richard Nixon
- September 6 – George Meany
- September 13 – Edmund Muskie
- September 20 – B. F. Skinner
- September 27 – Attica Prison Riots
- October 4 – Emperor Hirohito
- October 11 – The New Spy
- October 18 – John Connally
- October 25 – Jesus Christ Superstar
- November 1 – William Rehnquist & Lewis Powell Jr.
- November 8 – Zhou Enlai
- November 15 – Battle over Busing
- November 22 – Beverly Sills
- November 29 – Edward Kennedy
- December 6 – Indira Gandhi & Yahya Khan
- December 13 – Space Exploration
- December 20 – Birth of Bangladesh
- December 27 – The Good Samaritan (stained glass depiction by Leandro Velasco)

== 1972 ==
- January 3 – Richard Nixon, Man of the Year
- January 10 – IRA Fighter
- January 17 – Roger Staubach & Bob Griese
- January 24 – Howard Hughes
- January 31 – Flip Wilson
- February 7 – Henry Kissinger
- February 14 – Robert Coles
- February 21 – Clifford Irving
- February 28 – Liza Minnelli
- March 6 – Nixon in China
- March 13 – Is the U.S. Going Broke?
- March 20 – The American Woman
- March 27 – George Wallace
- April 3 – Jack Anderson
- April 10 – What It Means to be Jewish
- April 17 – Viet Nam
- April 24 – Gang War
- May 1 – Richard Nixon
- May 8 – George McGovern
- May 15 – Võ Nguyên Giáp
- May 22 – Haiphong Harbor
- May 29 – Leonid Brezhnev
- June 5 – Moscow Summit
- June 12 – Kemmons Wilson
- June 19 – The Occult Revival
- June 26 – Edwin Land
- July 3 – Woody Allen
- July 10 – Johnny Bench
- July 17 – Kenneth Elstein
- July 24 – George McGovern & Thomas Eagleton
- July 31 – Boris Spassky & Bobby Fischer
- August 7 – Thomas Eagleton
- August 14 – Sargent Shriver & George McGovern
- August 21 – Sex and the Teenager
- August 28 – Richard Nixon & Spiro Agnew
- September 4 – Global War on Heroin
- September 11 – Mark Spitz
- September 18 – Murder at the Olympics
- September 25 – Redd Foxx, Bea Arthur & Carroll O'Connor
- October 2 – Richard Nixon & George McGovern
- October 9 – Pat Nixon & Eleanor McGovern
- October 16 – Joe Namath
- October 23 – Campaign Financing
- October 30 – Henry Kissinger
- November 6 – The Shape of Peace
- November 13 – Richard Bach
- November 20 – Richard Nixon
- November 27 – Ernest and Julio Gallo
- December 4 – Liv Ullmann
- December 11 – Don Shula
- December 18 – Nutrition
- December 25 – Skiing

== 1973 ==
- January 1 – Henry Kissinger & Richard Nixon, Time Men of the Year
- January 8 – The Bombing Question
- January 15 – Crisis in Congress
- January 22 – Marlon Brando
- January 29 – Nixon's Second Term with Zhou Enlai, Leonid Brezhnev, Nguyễn Văn Thiệu, Henry Kissinger, Lê Đức Thọ, South Vietnamese soldier, American POW & Vietnam veteran protester
- February 5 – Vietnam Cease-Fire with Lê Đức Thọ & Henry Kissinger
- February 12 – Ian Anderson, Roberta Flack, Harry Nilsson & Carole King
- February 19 – POW Families
- February 26 – George Shultz
- March 5 – Carlos Castaneda
- March 12 – Europe
- March 19 – Robert A. Good
- March 26 – L. Patrick Gray
- April 2 – Muammar Gaddafi
- April 9 – Food Prices
- April 16 – Sam Ervin
- April 23 – Pedro Arrupe
- April 30 – The Watergate Scandal
- May 7 – Georg Solti
- May 14 – Richard Nixon
- May 21 – John Mitchell
- May 28 – Watergate Revelations
- June 4 – Richard Nixon
- June 11 – Secretariat
- June 18 – The U.S. Economy
- June 25 – Leonid Brezhnev
- July 2 – John Dean
- July 9 – John Dean & Richard Nixon
- July 16 – Marilyn Monroe & Norman Mailer
- July 23 – John Mitchell
- July 30 – Richard Nixon & Sam Ervin
- August 6 – Constitutional Challenge
- August 13 – Wendell Anderson
- August 20 – Spiro Agnew & Richard Nixon
- August 27 – Nixon's Problems
- September 3 – Henry Kissinger
- September 10 – Bobby Riggs
- September 17 – Hamburger Empire
- September 24 – Salvador Allende
- October 1 – Spiro Agnew
- October 8 – Spiro Agnew
- October 15 – Middle East War
- October 22 – Gerald Ford
- October 29 – Archibald Cox & Richard Nixon
- November 5 – Richard Nixon
- November 12 – Nixon's Jury: The People
- November 19 – King Faisal of Saudi Arabia
- November 26 – Peter Falk
- December 3 – The Big Freeze
- December 10 – Rose Mary Woods
- December 17 – Gerald & Betty Ford
- December 24 – The Child's World: Christmas 1973
- December 31 – The Big Car

== 1974 ==
- January 7 – John Sirica, Man of the Year
- January 14 – Inside the Brain
- January 21 – William E. Simon
- January 28 – The Telltale Tape
- February 4 – Tip O'Neill
- February 11 – James Schlesinger
- February 18 – Exxon
- February 25 – Aleksandr Solzhenitsyn
- March 4 – The Psychics
- March 11 – Leon Jaworski
- March 18 – Robert Redford & Mia Farrow in The Great Gatsby
- March 25 – James D. St. Clair
- April 1 – Henry Kissinger with Henry M. Jackson, Mao Zedong, Georges Pompidou, Hafez al-Assad, Anwar Sadat, Golda Meir & Leonid Brezhnev
- April 8 – World Inflation
- April 15 – Richard Nixon
- April 22 – Alcoholism
- April 29 – Patty Hearst
- May 6 – Merle Haggard
- May 13 – Richard Nixon
- May 20 – Nixon's Collapsing Presidency
- May 27 – Mid-East Massacres (victims of Ma'alot massacre and of retaliatory attacks on Lebanon at Nabatieh refugee camp)
- June 3 – Reggie Jackson
- June 10 – Henry Kissinger
- June 17 – Middle-Class Blacks
- June 24 – Richard Nixon & Anwar Sadat
- July 1 – Richard Nixon, Henry M. Jackson & Leonid Brezhnev
- July 8 – The Press: Fair or Foul
- July 15 – Leadership in America
- July 22 – Nixon & The Supreme Court
- July 29 – Republicans (Charles E. Wiggins, Robert McClory, William Cohen) & Impeachment
- August 5 – Peter W. Rodino
- August 12 – Jack Nicholson
- August 19 – Gerald Ford
- August 26 – Gerald Ford
- September 2 – Nelson Rockefeller
- September 9 – The Economy
- September 16 – Richard Nixon
- September 23 – Gerald Ford
- September 30 – William Colby
- October 7 – Betty Ford, Joan Kennedy & Pat Nixon
- October 14 – Gerald Ford
- October 21 – Jerry Brown
- October 28 – Mary Tyler Moore & Valerie Harper
- November 4 – Shah of Iran Mohammad Reza Pahlavi
- November 11 – Yasser Arafat
- November 18 – David L. Boren, Jerry Brown, Dale Bumpers, Hugh Carey, Michael Dukakis, John Glenn, Ella Grasso & Gary Hart
- November 25 – The Big Raise. Labor & Inflation
- December 2 – Yitzhak Rabin
- December 9 – The Recession
- December 16 – Joni Mitchell
- December 23 – The American Pet
- December 30 – Biblical Magi

== 1975 ==
- January 6 – Faisal of Saudi Arabia, Man of the Year
- January 13 – Dr. John Laragh
- January 20 – Gerald Ford
- January 27 – Gerald Ford & Carl Albert doctoring the Economy
- February 3 – Chou En-Lai
- February 10 – Rebates and Smaller Cars
- February 17 – Henry M. Jackson
- February 24 – Bernie Parent
- March 3 – The World Arms Trade
- March 10 – American Jews & Israel
- March 17 – Cher
- March 24 – Indochina
- March 31 – Vietnam
- April 7 – America (Henry Kissinger) & the World (Faisal of Saudi Arabia, Nguyễn Văn Thiệu, Yitzhak Rabin & Anwar Sadat)
- April 14 – Vietnam
- April 21 – Gerald Ford
- April 28 – Jimmy Connors
- May 5 – North Vietnamese Victory
- May 12 – Ho Chi Minh
- May 19 – Mikhail Baryshnikov
- May 26 – Mayaguez Incident
- June 2 – Old Age: How to help our parents
- June 9 – Anwar Sadat
- June 16 – Margaux Hemingway
- June 23 – Scene from Jaws
- June 30 – Crime
- July 7 – Elton John
- July 14 – Adam Smith
- July 21 – U.S. & Soviet hands shaking
- July 28 – The Ford family in the White House
- August 4 – Gerald Ford & Leonid Brezhnev
- August 11 – Lisbon's Troika: Otelo Saraiva de Carvalho, Vasco dos Santos Goncalves & Francisco da Costa Gomes
- August 18 – Charles O. Finley
- August 25 – Yitzhak Rabin, Henry Kissinger & Anwar Sadat
- September 1 – Earthquakes
- September 8 – Air Force Sergeant Leonard Matlovich
- September 15 – Lynette Alice Fromme
- September 22 – Busing Battle
- September 29 – Patricia Hearst, alias Tania
- October 6 – Gerald Ford
- October 13 – The Maharishi
- October 20 – Abraham Beame
- October 27 – Bruce Springsteen
- November 3 – Juan Carlos
- November 10 – Sarah Caldwell
- November 17 – Donald Rumsfeld, George H. W. Bush, Gerald Ford & Henry Kissinger
- November 24 – Ronald Reagan
- December 1 – Bloomingdale's shoppers
- December 8 – L. C. Greenwood, Dwight White, Ernie Holmes & Joe Greene
- December 15 – Marisa Berenson
- December 22 – J. Edgar Hoover
- December 29 – Mother Teresa

== 1976 ==
- January 5 – Betty Ford, Carla Hills, Ella Grasso, Barbara Jordan, Susie Sharp, Jill Ker Conway, Billie Jean King, Susan Brownmiller, Addie Wyatt, Kathleen Byerly, Carol Sutton, Alison Cheek, Women of the Year
- January 12 – Scene from Days of Our Lives (Susan Seaforth Hayes & Bill Hayes)
- January 19 – Deng Xiaoping
- January 26 – Daniel Patrick Moynihan
- February 2 – Dorothy Hamill
- February 9 – Doonesbury
- February 16 – F. Lee Bailey
- February 23 – Lockheed Scandal
- March 1 – Gore Vidal
- March 8 – Jimmy Carter with Mo Udall, Henry M. Jackson, George Wallace & Hubert Humphrey
- March 15 – Americans on the Move
- March 22 – American Chic (model Carol Gustafson)
- March 29 – Dustin Hoffman & Robert Redford
- April 5 – The Porno Plague
- April 12 – The Middle East Crisis (Lebanese Civil War photograph by Catherine Leroy)
- April 19 – Howard Hughes
- April 26 – Baseball player Babe Ruth
- May 3 – Royal Families
- May 10 – Jimmy Carter
- May 17 – Gerald Ford & Ronald Reagan
- May 24 – U.S. Catholicism
- May 31 – Paul McCartney
- June 7 – West Point Scandal
- June 14 – Enrico Berlinguer
- June 21 – Jimmy Carter, Ronald Reagan & Gerald Ford
- June 28 – Rediscovering America
- July 4 – Thomas Jefferson
- July 5 – Birthday Issue
- July 12 – The Bugs are Coming
- July 19 – The Democratic Convention
- July 26 – Jimmy Carter & Walter Mondale
- August 2 – Nadia Comăneci
- August 9 – Gerald Ford
- August 16 – Disease Detectives: Tracing the Philly Killer
- August 23 – The G.O.P. in Trouble
- August 30 – The G.O.P Strategy (Gerald Ford & Bob Dole)
- September 6 – Sex and Tennis
- September 13 – Campaign Kickoff
- September 20 – Mao Tse-tung
- September 27 – The South
- October 4 – Jimmy Carter & Gerald Ford
- October 11 – Ian Smith
- October 18 – Gerald Ford
- October 25 – Publicity still of Jessica Lange in King Kong
- November 1 – Voting Your Pocketbook
- November 8 – Jimmy Carter & Gerald Ford
- November 15 – Jimmy Carter
- November 22 – Charlie's Angels (Farrah Fawcett, Kate Jackson & Jaclyn Smith)
- November 29 – Robert Rauschenberg
- December 6 – Gambling Goes Legit
- December 13 – Howard Hughes
- December 20 – Hamilton Jordan, Walter Mondale & Jimmy Carter
- December 27 – Stars: Where Life Begins

== 1977 ==
- January 3 – Jimmy Carter, Man of the Year
- January 10 – The Super Bowl: the Great American Spectacle – Two football players from Oakland Raiders and Minnesota Vikings
- January 17 – Rupert Murdoch with Clay Felker
- January 24 – America's Mood
- January 31 – The Big Freeze
- February 7 – Amy Carter & her dog
- February 14 – Alex Haley & two Roots miniseries characters
- February 21 – Andrei Sakharov
- February 28 – Linda Ronstadt
- March 7 – Idi Amin
- March 14 – Marabel Morgan
- March 21 – Chiang Ching & Mao Zedong
- March 28 – Lily Tomlin
- April 4 – James Schlesinger
- April 11 – Air Travel: How Safe?
- April 18 – DNA Furor – Tinkering with Life
- April 25 – Jimmy Carter
- May 2 – Uncle Sam character
- May 9 – Richard Nixon & David Frost
- May 16 – Mafia
- May 23 – Harold Brown
- May 30 – Menachem Begin
- June 6 – Jody Powell & Hamilton Jordan
- June 13 – Peter Frampton, Steve Cauthen, Wally Amos & Colleen McCullough
- June 20 – James Earl Ray
- June 27 – Adolfo Suárez
- July 4 – Summer
- July 11 – Youth Crime
- July 18 – Rod Carew
- July 25 – Blackout '77: Once More With Looting
- August 1 – Sociobiology: A new theory of behavior
- August 8 – Jimmy Carter, Leonid Brezhnev, Menachem Begin, Anwar Sadat, Hua Guofeng & Helmut Schmidt
- August 15 – Arthur Ochs Sulzberger
- August 22 – Panama Canal & Uncle Sam
- August 29 – The Underclass
- September 5 – Fred Silverman
- September 12 – Sky-High Housing
- September 19 – Bert Lance & Jimmy Carter
- September 26 – Diane Keaton
- October 3 – John le Carré
- October 10 – Revolt of the Old: The Battle Over Forced Retirement
- October 17 – Jimmy Carter & Moshe Dayan
- October 24 – Mstislav Rostropovich
- October 31 – Hanns Martin Schleyer, Jürgen Schumann, woman terrorist, returned hostages
- November 7 – Richard Leakey & a Homo Habilis
- November 14 – High School in Trouble
- November 21 – John Vorster
- November 28 – Anwar Sadat
- December 5 – After Houston: What Next for Women (Peggy Kokernot)
- December 12 – Dixy Lee Ray
- December 19 – The Cooking Craze
- December 26 – Jesus and various faithfuls

"Fact Check — Image purporting to show Time magazine cover warning of an impending ice age is digitally altered". Reuters. November 1, 2021.

== 1978 ==
- January 2 – Anwar Sadat, Man of the Year
- January 9 – Burt Reynolds & Clint Eastwood
- January 16 – Super Bowl XII
- January 23 – Robert Byrd
- January 30 – Michael Blumenthal
- February 6 – Stansfield Turner
- February 13 – Pierre Trudeau & René Lévesque
- February 20 – The Computer Society
- February 27 – Muhammad Ali
- March 6 – Cheryl Tiegs
- March 13 – Socialism
- March 20 – Coal Crisis
- March 27 – Menachem Begin & Yasser Arafat
- April 3 – John Travolta
- April 10 – Lawyers
- April 17 – The Fantastic World of Steinberg – Saul Steinberg drawings
- April 24 – Cyrus Vance
- May 1 – Gelsey Kirkland
- May 8 – Attack on the Navy
- May 15 – Prince Charles
- May 22 – Prince Fahd
- May 29 – Steve Cauthen
- June 5 – Politics of Africa (Leonid Brezhnev, Fidel Castro, Valéry Giscard d'Estaing & Jimmy Carter)
- June 12 – Joseph Califano
- June 19 – Howard Jarvis
- June 26 – Women in Sports
- July 3 – Warren Beatty
- July 10 – What Bakke Means
- July 17 – G. William Miller
- July 24 – Anatoli Shcharansky
- July 31 – The Test-Tube Baby: Birth Watch in Britain
- August 7 – Lobbyists
- August 14 – New Era in the Air: Cheap Fares, Crowded Flights
- August 21 – Baggio, Willebrands, Bertoli, Pignedoli & Pironio
- August 28 – Mario Puzo
- September 4 – Pope John Paul I (Conclave)
- September 11 – Menachem Begin
- September 18 – Shah of Iran Mohammad Reza Pahlavi
- September 25 – Menachem Begin & Anwar Sadat
- October 2 – Jimmy Carter
- October 9 – Pope John Paul I
- October 16 – Hispanic Americans
- October 23 – Elections '78: The Tax Shelters
- October 30 – Pope John Paul II (Conclave)
- November 6 – Pat Benedict
- November 13 – To the Rescue: The battered Dollar
- November 20 – Big Winners: Adding Up the Results – Brown, Bradley, Carey, Kassebaum, Cochran and Thompson
- November 27 – Letitia Baldrige
- December 4 – Cult of Death (Jonestown deaths)
- December 11 – Michel Bergerac
- December 18 – Convention Fever
- December 25 – Jimmy Carter, Deng Xiaoping & Menachem Begin

== 1979 ==
- January 1 – Deng Xiaoping, Man of the Year
- January 8 – Philip Johnson
- January 15 – Crescent of Crisis: Troubles Beyond Iran
- January 22 – Leonid Brezhnev
- January 29 – Colombian Connection: Billions in Pot & Coke
- February 5 – Deng Xiaoping
- February 12 – Ayatollah Khomeini
- February 19 – Albert Einstein
- February 26 – Iran: Anarchy and Exodus
- March 5 – Communists at War: China and Vietnam War & Cambodian–Vietnamese War
- March 12 – Robin Williams
- March 19 – Jimmy Carter
- March 26 – Mideast Peace: Its Risks and Rewards
- April 2 – Psychiatry's Depression
- April 9 – Nuclear Nightmare: Three Mile Island
- April 16 – Islam: The Militant Revival
- April 23 – How gay Is gay: Homosexuality in America
- April 30 – Woody Allen
- May 7 – The Oil Game
- May 14 – Margaret Thatcher
- May 21 – Now The Great Debate: SALT II
- May 28 – Medical Costs: Seeking the Cure
- June 4 – Russell Baker
- June 11 – Helmut Schmidt
- June 18 – Pope John Paul II
- June 25 – Jimmy Carter & Leonid Brezhnev
- July 2 – The Energy Mess
- July 9 – The World Over a Barrel: OPEC's Tightening Oil Squeeze
- July 16 – Here Come Skylab!
- July 23 – Jimmy Carter
- July 30 – Now What?: Carter's Cabinet Purge
- August 6 – Leadership in America: 50 Faces For the Future
- August 13 – Diane Lane
- August 20 – Judging the Judges: An Outsize Job – and Getting Bigger
- August 27 – The Topsy-Turvy Economy: New Ideas to Set It Right
- September 3 – Ansel Adams
- September 10 – John Connally
- September 17 – Cyrus Vance & Fidel Castro
- September 24 – Luciano Pavarotti
- October 1 – Henry Kissinger
- October 8 – José López Portillo
- October 15 – Pope John Paul II
- October 22 – Paul Volcker
- October 29 – David C. Jones
- November 5 – Edward Kennedy
- November 12 – Starvation: Deathwatch in Cambodia
- November 19 – Blackmailing the U.S.
- November 26 – Ayatollah Khomeini & Jimmy Carter
- December 3 – Attacking America: Fury in Iran, Rescue in Pakistan
- December 10 – Shah of Iran Mohammad Reza Shah
- December 17 – The Who (Pete Townshend, Roger Daltrey, John Entwistle & Kenney Jones)
- December 24 – The Cooling of America
- December 31 – Going... Going... Gone!: The Art and Antique Boom

Previous	Lists of covers of Time magazine	Next
1960s	1970s	1980s
