= Ed Kovens =

American actor (1934–2007)

- Born: June 26, 1934; New York, U.S.
- Died: August 21, 2007 (aged 73); New York City, New York, U.S.
- Occupation: Actor
- Years active: 1971-1992

Ed Kovens (June 26, 1934 – August 21, 2007) was an American SAG, AFTRA, and AEA actor. Furthermore he was a Method acting instructor based in New York City. He was a member of the Actors Studio and worked with the legendary Lee Strasberg.

== Biography ==
New York-bred Ed Kovens became a professional actor at 19 after acting and directing in high school and college. While studying at New York University in acting and directing, Kovens worked as a stand-up comic, did small parts and extra work in film and TV (mainly because of his age); directed some plays and reviews and did some Off-Off-Broadway leads.

In 1957, he started studying with Lee Strasberg in a small studio above the Capitol Theatre, then at Carnegie Hall, and subsequently, at the Actors Studio (where he became a member in 1968) until Strasberg's death in 1982.

In 1965, a bunch of Strasberg students asked Kovens to form an exercise class - Strasberg's classes were packed, they wanted to work, and they felt Kovens had some expertise. Some major stars now, who were Strasberg's students then, were in that group. In 1969, he became a founding staff member of the Lee Strasberg Institute. In 1974, he left the Strasberg Institute and formed his own classes, called The Professional Workshop. Kovens having taught for over 40 years is one of the most experienced Method Acting teachers in the world. In 2006, Kovens wrote and published The Method Manual, a book for actors and teachers of acting.

Ed Kovens died on August 21, 2007. He is buried in Truro Cemetery, in Columbus Grove, Ohio, the hometown of his widow, Jill Anne Edwards.

== Credits ==
Kovens can be seen in numerous film, television and theater productions. For television, Kovens has been in Law & Order, NYPD Blue, and 4Pla]. He played Ahmed in the Tales From The Darkside episode "The Grave Robber" (1986). For film, The Gambler (with James Caan), The Bad Lieutenant (with Harvey Keitel) and Muggable Mary (with Karen Valentine). For Broadway, Kovens has been in over 75 productions, including Passione and Three Sisters.

== Filmography ==
Year	Title	Role	Notes
1971	The Pursuit of Happiness	1st Guard	
1974	The Gambler	Ricky	
1982	Q	Second Robber	
1986	Detective School Dropouts	Store Owner	
1988	Police Academy 5: Assignment Miami Beach	Dempsey	
1992	Bad Lieutenant	Monsignor	

== Alumni ==
- Sissy Spacek (Academy Award winner)
- Jennifer Beals (Flashdance; The L Word)
- Sean Young (No Way Out)
- Robert Lulone (Tony Award nominee)
- Thomas Calabro (Melrose Place)
- Robert Costanzo over 200 films
- Loretta Devine "Dreamgirls"
- Chazz Palminteri (The Usual Suspects, etc.)
- Joe Seneca "The Verdict etc"
