= Thomas van Aalten =

Dutch writer

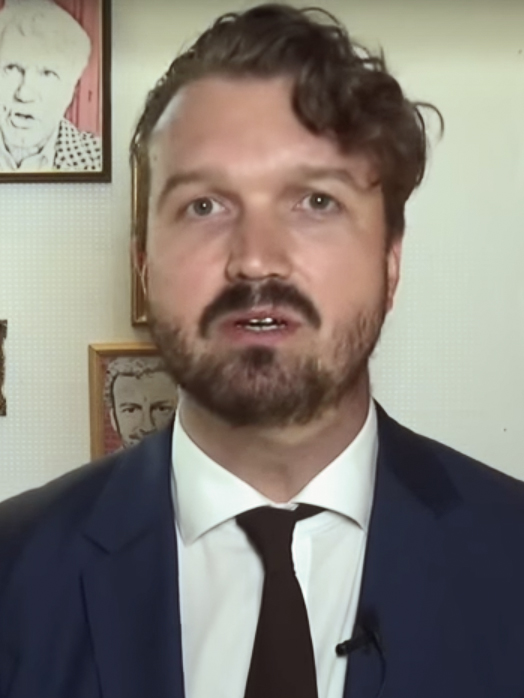
- Thomas van Aalten (2016)
- Born: 26 September 1978 (age 47); Huissen, Gelderland
- Occupation: Writer

Thomas van Aalten (born September 26, 1978) is a Dutch writer. He made his debut with a story in the literary magazine Zoetermeer, at the age of 19. Van Aalten has written the novels Sneeuwbeeld (2000), Tupelo (2001), Sluit Deuren en Ramen (2003), Coyote (2006) and De Onderbreking (2009) and several articles for magazines such as 3voor12, Passionate, VARA TV Magazine, Revu and Vrij Nederland. Van Aalten's style is characterized by absurd dialogues, creepy atmospheres and strange characters. He is a F.C. St. Pauli enthusiast and fan of rock music like Motörhead, The Sisters of Mercy. Van Aalten also often works together with Berlin-based burlesque filmmaker Edwin Brienen.

His fifth novel was a stunt; Exile appeared only on a mobile phone after sending an SMS text message. The story contained comments on the abuse of new technologies.
