= Jacques Van Aalten =

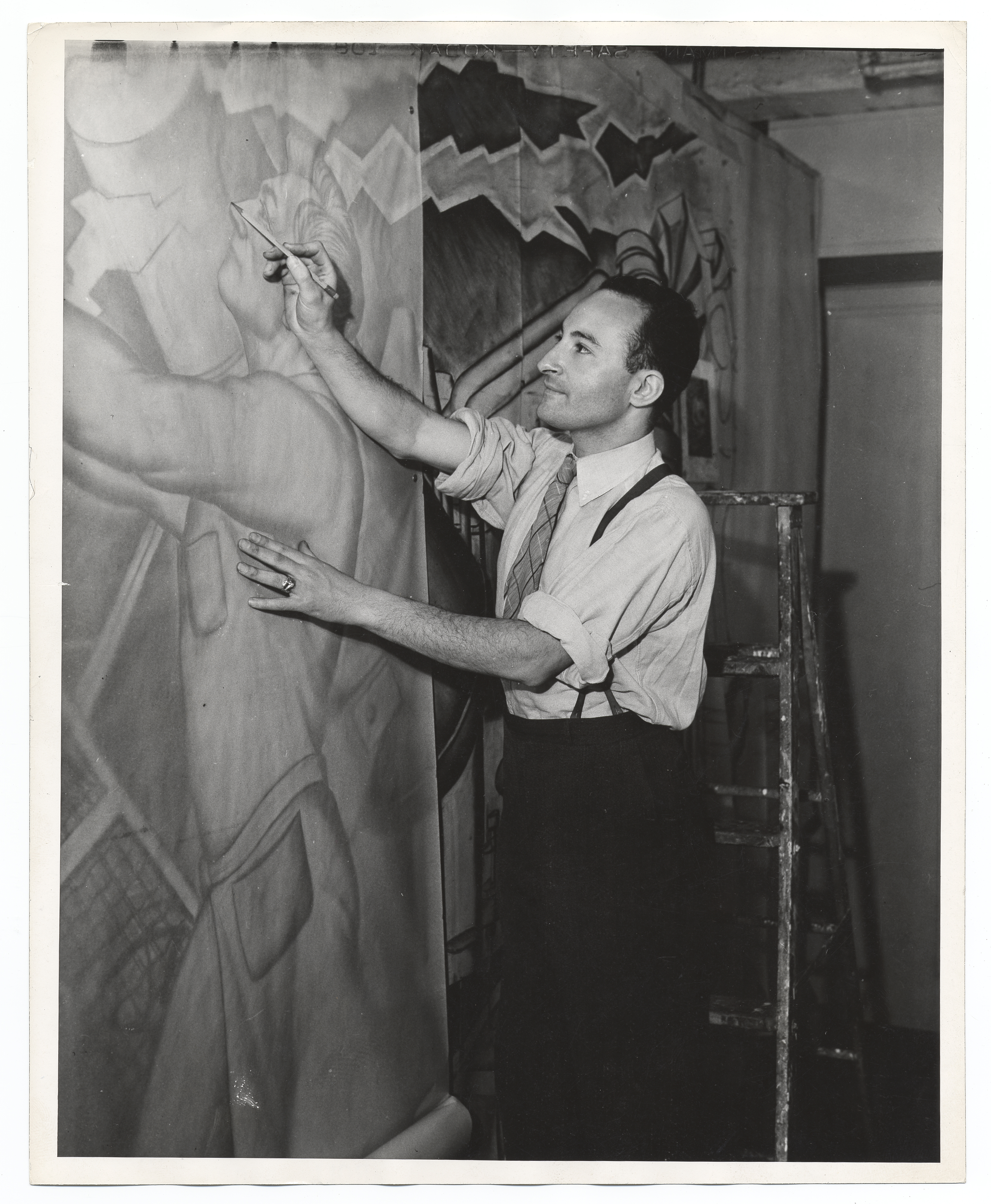
Jacques Van Aalten

Jacques Van Aalten (April 12, 1907 – May 24, 1997) was an American artist.

== Life ==
He was born in Antwerp, Belgium. He studied at Grande Chaumiere, National Academy of Design, and the Art Students League of New York. He was a member of the Federal Art Project.

He married Mimi Van Aalten; they lived in New Orleans, from 1950 to 1972. They moved to Florida in 1972. He is buried in Broward County, Florida.
