= The New York Times Upfront =

- Executive Editor: Ian Zack
- Categories: Newsmagazine
- Frequency: Bimonthly
- Circulation: 453,000 subscriptions per issue (as of 2017)
- Founded: 1999
- Company: Scholastic, Inc.
- Country: U.S.
- Language: English
- Website: Upfront Homepage
- ISSN: 1525-1292

The New York Times Upfront is a news magazine for high school students, published by Scholastic Inc. in partnership with The New York Times. The magazine and its website feature journalism from the Times, as well as material produced by Upfront’s editorial staff.

Edited with a high school audience in mind, Upfront covers a wide array of topics of interest to teenagers, explaining how news events relate to them, their communities, and their futures.

The magazine and its accompanying resources, including videos and skills activities, are designed to teach students how to think critically, form their own opinions and become informed and engaged citizens. Upfront is also intended to boost students' non-fiction reading skills. It brings current events into the classroom while connecting with high school curricula by meeting rigorous national and state standards in social studies and English/Language Arts.

Although Upfront is targeted at a high school audience, some teachers also use it for a younger, gifted audience. More than 15,000 Social Studies and English/Language Arts teachers nationwide subscribe to Upfront for their students.

Published 13 times during the school year, Upfront has a circulation of approximately 453,000, with a readership of over 1.3 million students—since teachers generally use the magazine with more than one class and often share it with other teachers (the pass along rate is estimated at 3).

Each issue comes with a teacher's edition that includes in-depth lesson plans, quizzes and skills activities. Upfront’s website offers videos, additional skills sheets, text sets (editor-curated collections focusing on key social studies topics or skills) and an interactive world atlas and almanac. In addition, every feature article published in print is also available online in two different Lexile levels.

== History ==
The New York Times Upfront was first published in 1999, but it arguably has roots dating back to Scholastic's earliest days. The company's first high school magazine was called The Western Pennsylvania Scholastic and it evolved and changed names over the decades, becoming Scholastic Senior and Update.

In 1999, Scholastic partnered with The New York Times, and Update became The New York Times Upfront. The idea was to combine the journalistic resources of the Times and the reporting from its news bureaus around the world with Scholastic's ability to create magazines that meet the curricular needs of high school teachers. Upfront is also a way to introduce the Times brand and its journalism to a new generation of readers, complementing the Times website and its other education efforts.

== Magazine sections ==
Every issue of Upfront covers both domestic and international news. The topics frequently covered in the magazine are:

- Civics & U.S. Government
- U.S. History
- Constitution & The Law
- Elections
- Media Literacy
- Immigration
- Race & Identity
- Gender
- Environment & Science
- Economics
- China
- Russia
- India
- Teen Issues
- Energy & Climate Change

== Awards and recognition ==
According to press releases, The New York Times Upfront has been recognized multiple times for excellence by the Association of Educational Publishers.
