= Up Front (freestyle band) =

- Origin: New York City, New York U.S.
- Genres: Freestyle, post-disco, electro-funk, garage house
- Years active: 1983-1988
- Labels: Silver Cloud

Up Front was a United States-based electro-funk studio project, best known for their 10-minute track "Infatuation".

"Infatuation" was recognized and included on various post-disco compilation albums such as The Perfect Beats, Vol. 2, released by Tommy Boy Records.

== History ==
An early example of the New York Electro sound, "Infatuation" was one of the earliest influences of what would become known as freestyle; the tempo of this song is 122 beats per minute. Infatuation was written and produced by Eddie Colon and Fred Zarr with lyrics by W.Negron. The song was an NYC summer anthem and received heavy rotation on both New York and Miami Radio and clubs. Infatuation was a particular favorite at the Funhouse where DJ John "Jellybean" Benitez, who actually "broke" the track, rocked the house.

== Discography ==
=== Partial singles ===
"Infatuation"

U.S. 12" single	1. "Infatuation" (Special Club Mix) - 9:14; 2. "Infatuation" (Short Piano Version) - 5:29; 3. "Infatuation" (Dub Version) - 4:30; Written-by: Eddie Colon, Fred Zarr, Winston Negron; Mixed-by: Eddie Colon; Producer: Eddie Colon, Fred Zarr, Winston Negron

== Legacy ==
The track can be found on various compilation albums, including:

- The Perfect Beats, Vol. 2, released in 1998 by Tommy Boy.
