= Palacios de Goda =

- municipality
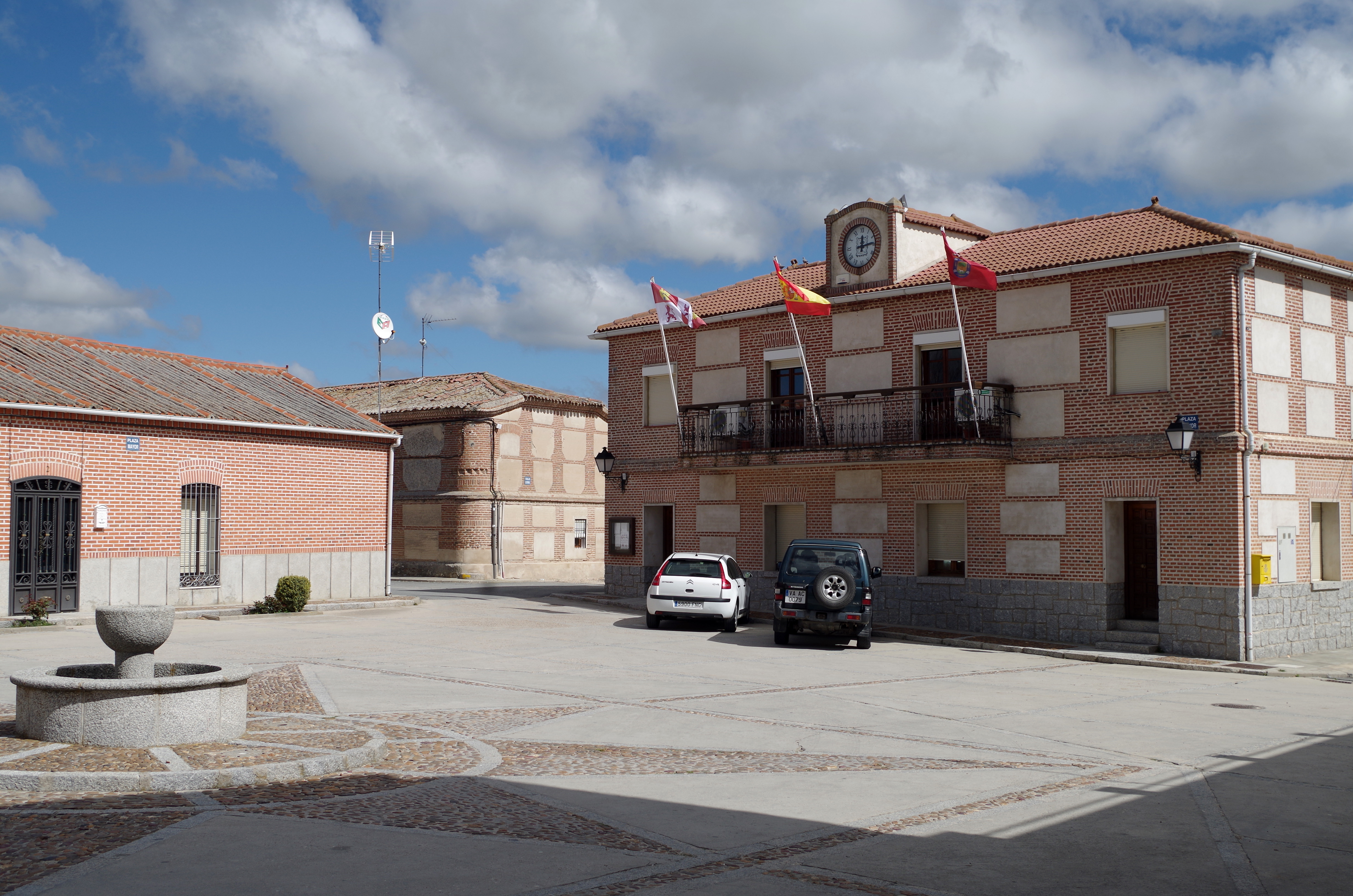
- Palacios de Goda Town Hall

- Flag Coat of arms

- Location in Spain. Palacios de Goda (Spain)
- Coordinates: 41°07′02″N 4°47′03″W
- Country: Spain
- Autonomous community: Castile and León
- Province: Ávila

Area
  - Total: 52 km^{2} (20 sq mi)

Population (2025-01-01)
  - Total: 396
  - Density: 7.6/km^{2} (20/sq mi)
- Time zone: UTC+1 (CET)
  - Summer (DST): UTC+2 (CEST)
- Climate: Csb
- Website: Official website

Palacios de Goda is a municipality located in the province of Ávila, Castile and León, Spain.

== Population ==
Historical population
Year	Pop.	±% p.a.
2023	407	—
2024	397	−2.46%
2025	396	−0.25%
Source: INE
