= Navaquesera =

- municipality
- Flag Coat of arms

- Location in Spain. Navaquesera (Spain)
- Coordinates: 40°25′30″N 4°54′31″W
- Country: Spain
- Autonomous community: Castile and León
- Province: Ávila
- Municipality: Navaquesera

Area
  - Total: 9 km^{2} (3.5 sq mi)

Population (2025-01-01)
  - Total: 38
  - Density: 4.2/km^{2} (11/sq mi)
- Time zone: UTC+1 (CET)
  - Summer (DST): UTC+2 (CEST)
- Website: Official website

Navaquesera is a municipality located in the province of Ávila, Castile and León, Spain.

== Population ==
Historical population
| Year | Pop. | ±% p.a. |
|---|---|---|
| 2023 | 40 | — |
| 2024 | 43 | +7.50% |
| 2025 | 38 | −11.63% |
Source: INE
