= Tolbaños =

- municipality
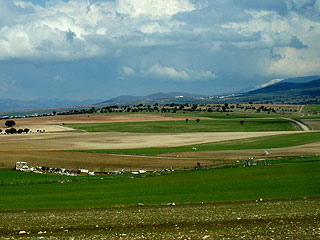

- Coat of arms

- Location in Spain. Tolbaños (Spain)
- Coordinates: 40°45′04″N 4°34′53″W
- Country: Spain
- Autonomous community: Castile and León
- Province: Ávila
- Municipality: Tolbaños

Area
  - Total: 52 km^{2} (20 sq mi)

Population (2025-01-01)
  - Total: 87
  - Density: 1.7/km^{2} (4.3/sq mi)
- Time zone: UTC+1 (CET)
  - Summer (DST): UTC+2 (CEST)
- Website: Official website

Tolbaños is a municipality located in the province of Ávila, Castile and León, Spain.

== Population ==
Historical population
Year	Pop.	±% p.a.
2023	82	—
2024	86	+4.88%
2025	87	+1.16%
Source: INE

== Gallery ==
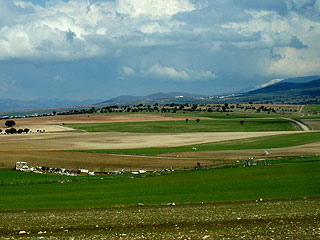
View of Tolbaños town, in the municipality of Tolbaños.

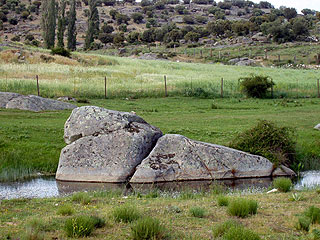
The Mediana River for Tolbaños.

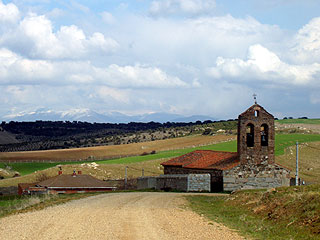
Sahornil Church from the road of Escalonilla.

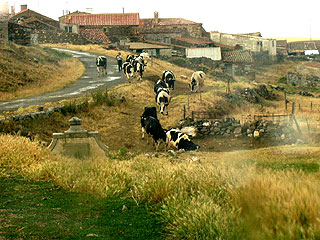
Livestock at Sahornil, Tolbaños.

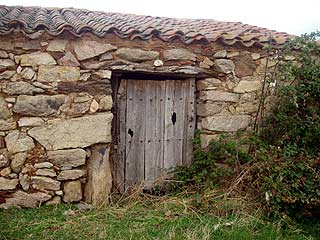
Typical house for Escalonilla, Tolbaños.

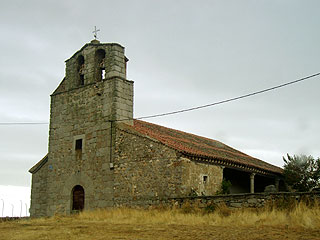
View of the Venta de San Vicente Church, in Tolbaños.

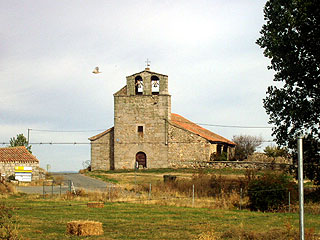
View of the Venta de San Vicente Church.

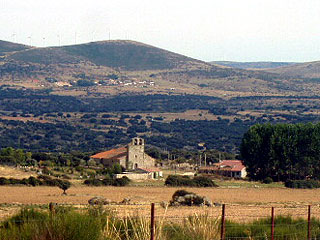
View of Venta de San Vicente from the road of San Esteban de los Patos.
