= Blascomillán =

- municipality
- Flag Coat of arms
- Extension of the municipal term within the province of Ávila

- Location in Spain. Blascomillán (Spain)
- Coordinates: 40°48′05″N 5°05′19″W
- Country: Spain
- Autonomous community: Castile and León
- Province: Ávila
- Municipality: Blascomillán

Area
  - Total: 39.60 km^{2} (15.29 sq mi)
- Elevation: 948 m (3,110 ft)

Population (2025-01-01)
  - Total: 169
  - Density: 4.27/km^{2} (11.1/sq mi)
- Time zone: UTC+1 (CET)
  - Summer (DST): UTC+2 (CEST)
- Website: Official website

Blascomillán is a municipality located in the province of Ávila, Castile and León, Spain. According to the 2025 census (INE), the municipality had a population of 169 inhabitants.

== Population ==
Historical population
Year	Pop.	±% p.a.
2023	169	—
2024	170	+0.59%
2025	169	−0.59%
Source: INE
