= Mediana de Voltoya =

- municipality
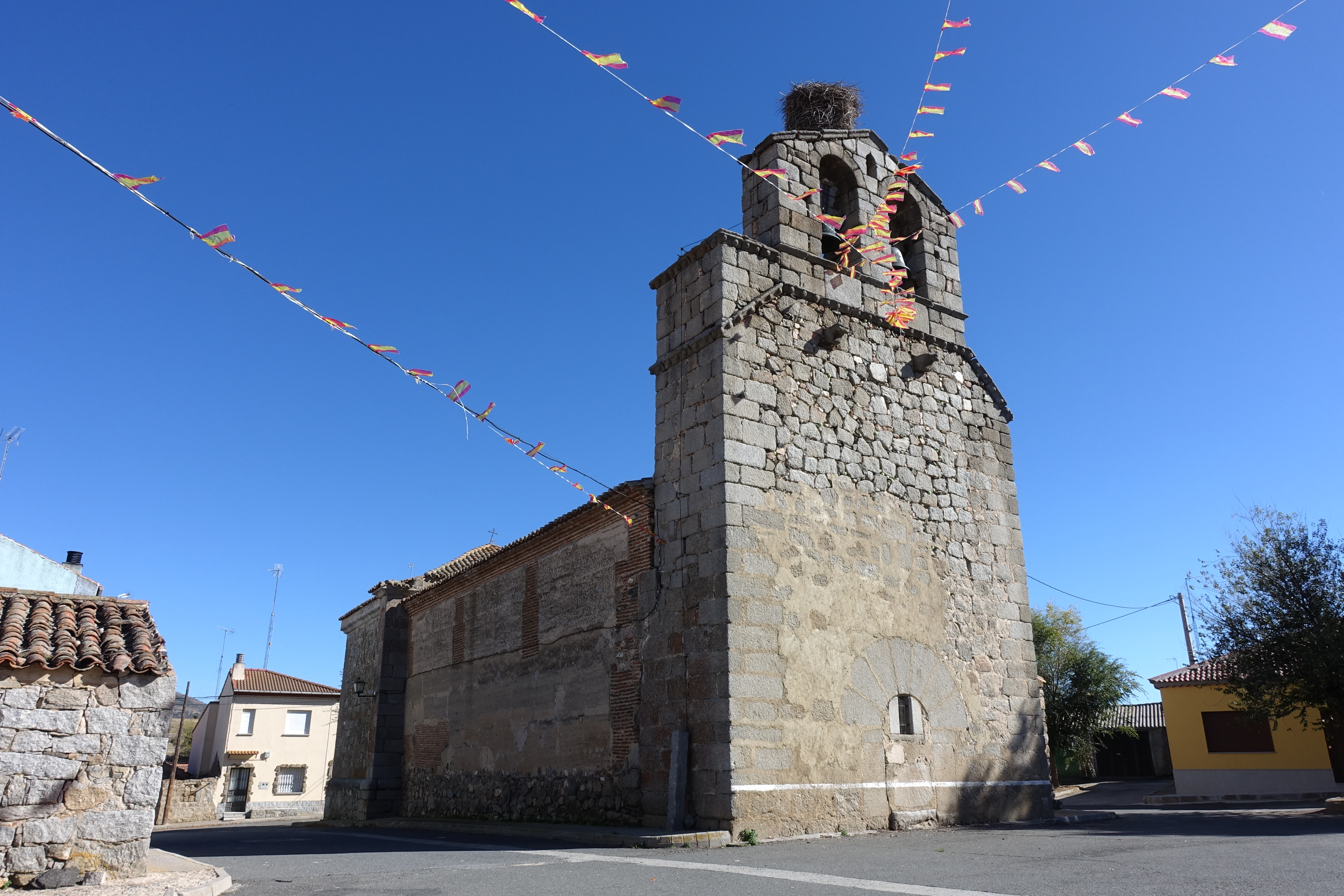
- Church of Santo Tomás Apóstol.

- Flag Coat of arms

- Location in Spain. Mediana de Voltoya (Spain)
- Coordinates: 40°42′02″N 4°33′50″W
- Country: Spain
- Autonomous community: Castile and León
- Province: Ávila
- Municipality: Mediana de Voltoya

Area
  - Total: 18.38 km^{2} (7.10 sq mi)
- Elevation: 1,110 m (3,640 ft)

Population (2025-01-01)
  - Total: 117
  - Density: 6.37/km^{2} (16.5/sq mi)
- Time zone: UTC+1 (CET)
  - Summer (DST): UTC+2 (CEST)
- Website: Official website

Mediana de Voltoya is a municipality located in the province of Ávila, Castile and León, Spain.

== Population ==
Historical population
Year	Pop.	±% p.a.
2023	117	—
2024	117	+0.00%
2025	117	+0.00%
Source: INE
