= Herreros de Suso =

- municipality
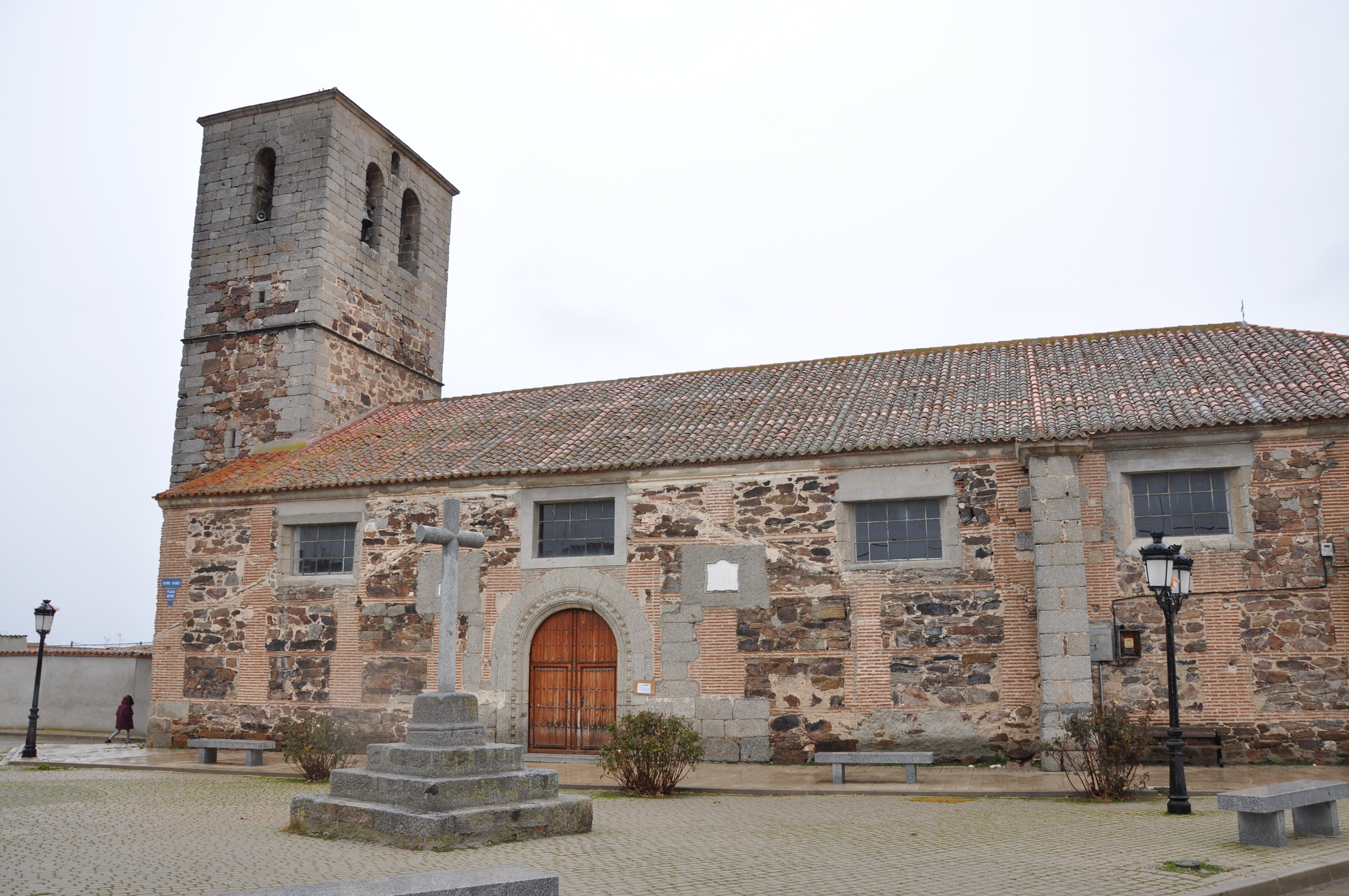
- Church of San Juan Evangelista, Herreros de Suso

- Flag Coat of arms

- Location in Spain. Herreros de Suso (Castile and León)
- Coordinates: 40°48′07″N 5°02′18″W
- Country: Spain
- Autonomous community: Castile and León
- Province: Ávila
- Municipality: Herreros de Suso

Area
  - Total: 21 km^{2} (8.1 sq mi)

Population (2025-01-01)
  - Total: 141
  - Density: 6.7/km^{2} (17/sq mi)
- Time zone: UTC+1 (CET)
  - Summer (DST): UTC+2 (CEST)
- Website: Official website

Herreros de Suso is a municipality in the province of Ávila, Castile and León, Spain.

== Population ==
Historical population
Year	Pop.	±% p.a.
2023	149	—
2024	140	−6.04%
2025	141	+0.71%
Source: INE
