= Santa María del Cubillo =

- municipality
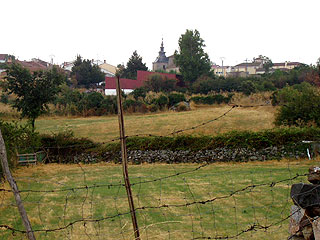
- View of Aldeavieja from the road of Blascoeles

- Flag Coat of arms

- Location in Spain. Santa María del Cubillo (Spain)
- Coordinates: 40°43′04″N 4°27′42″W
- Country: Spain
- Autonomous community: Castile and León
- Province: Ávila
- Municipality: Santa María del Cubillo

Area
  - Total: 66 km^{2} (25 sq mi)

Population (2025-01-01)
  - Total: 308
  - Density: 4.7/km^{2} (12/sq mi)
- Time zone: UTC+1 (CET)
  - Summer (DST): UTC+2 (CEST)
- Website: Official website

Santa María del Cubillo is a municipality located in the province of Ávila, Castile and León, Spain.

== Population ==
Historical population
Year	Pop.	±% p.a.
2023	315	—
2024	322	+2.22%
2025	308	−4.35%
Source: INE
