= Sotalbo =

- municipality
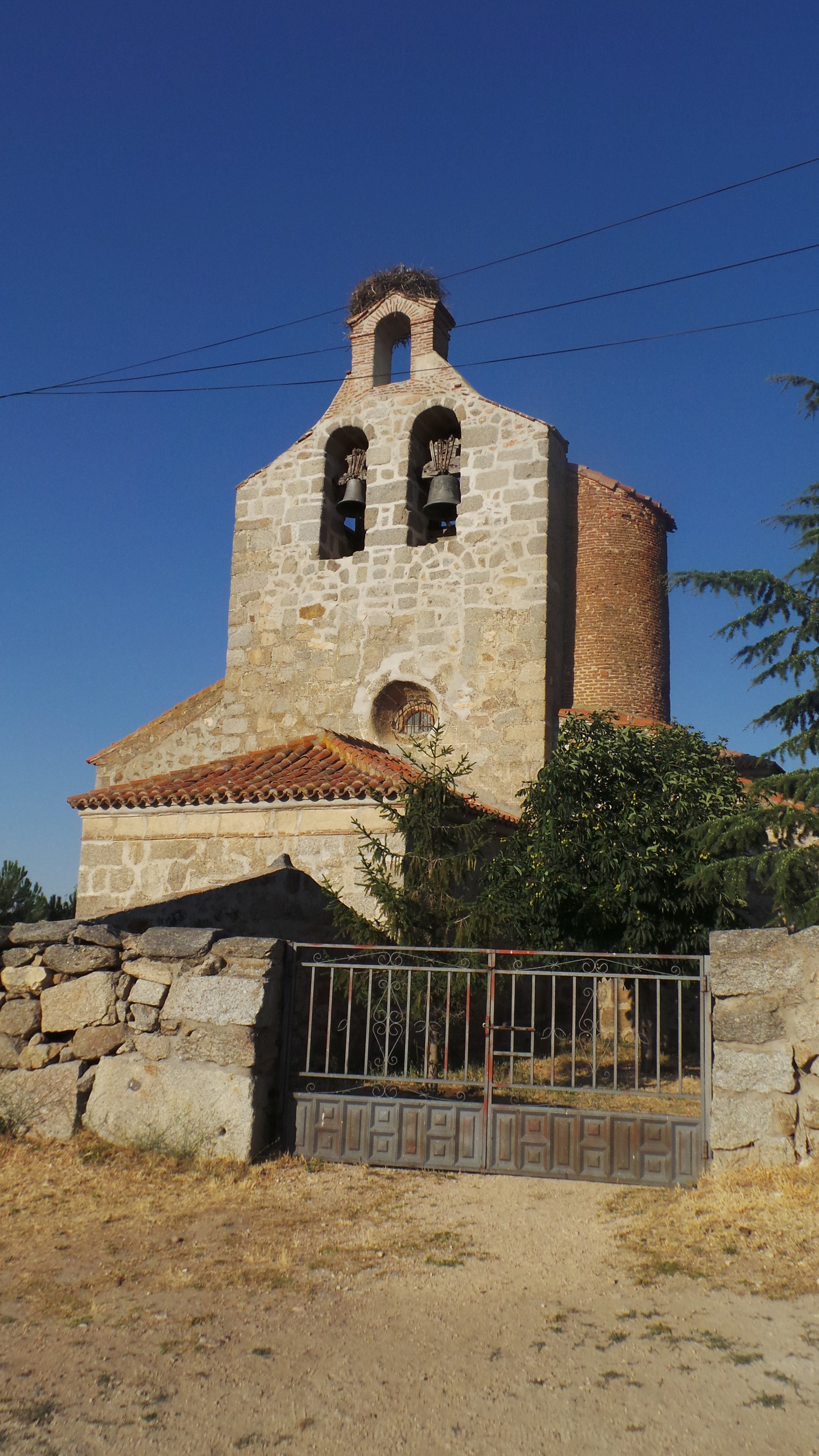
- Church of Our Lady of Purification

- Flag Coat of arms

- Location in Spain. Sotalbo (Spain)
- Coordinates: 40°32′31″N 4°50′54″W
- Country: Spain
- Autonomous community: Castile and León
- Province: Ávila

Area
  - Total: 90 km^{2} (35 sq mi)

Population (2025-01-01)
  - Total: 234
  - Density: 2.6/km^{2} (6.7/sq mi)
- Time zone: UTC+1 (CET)
  - Summer (DST): UTC+2 (CEST)
- Website: Official website

Sotalbo is a municipality located in the province of Ávila, Castile and León, Spain.

== Population ==
Historical population
Year	Pop.	±% p.a.
2023	247	—
2024	245	−0.81%
2025	234	−4.49%
Source: INE
