= Garganta del Villar =

- municipality
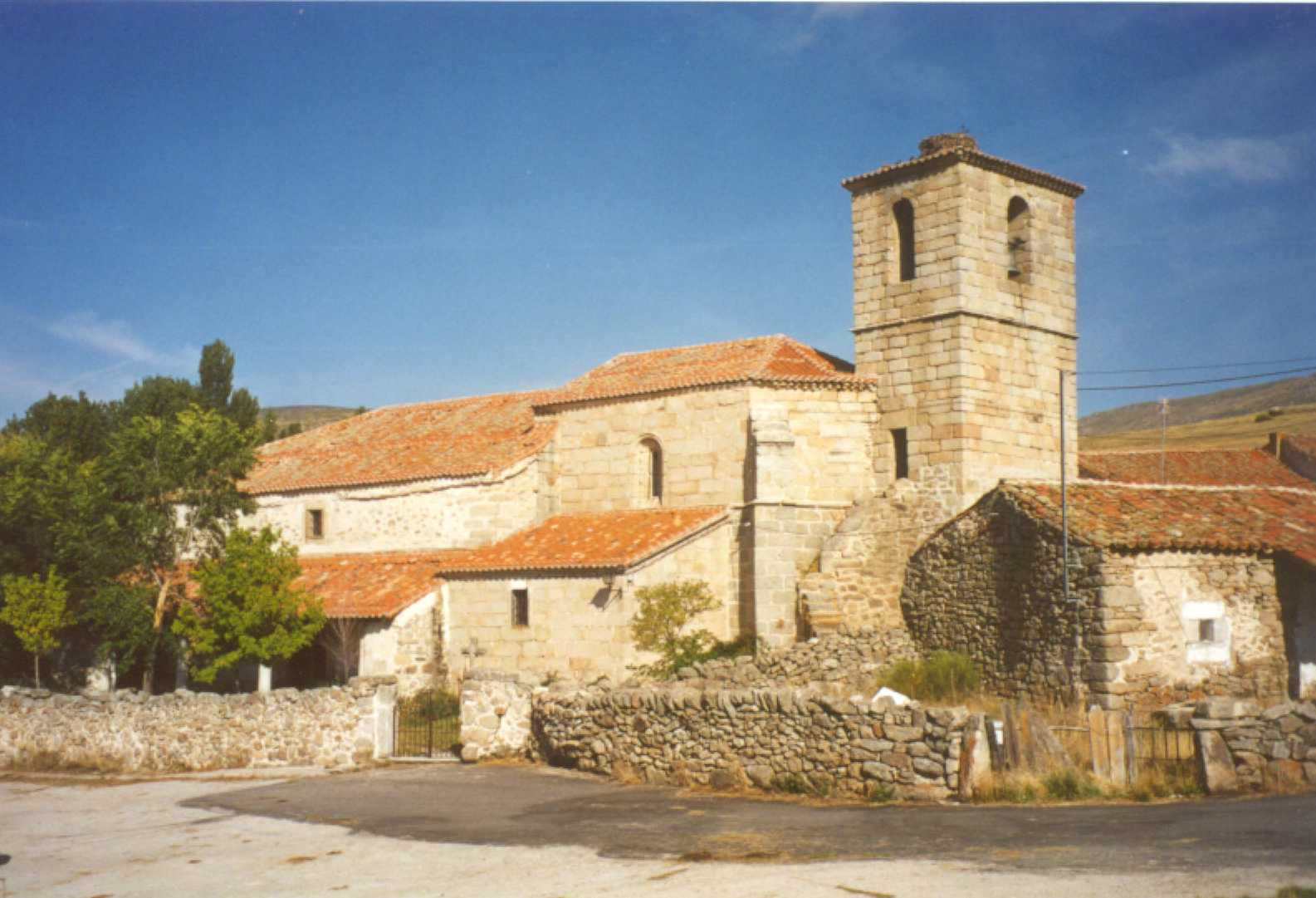
- Parish church of Garganta del Villar

- Flag Coat of arms

- Location in Spain. Garganta del Villar (Castile and León)
- Coordinates: 40°26′56″N 5°06′15″W
- Country: Spain
- Autonomous community: Castile and León
- Province: Ávila
- Municipality: Garganta del Villar

Area
  - Total: 18.57 km^{2} (7.17 sq mi)
- Elevation: 1,463 m (4,800 ft)

Population (2025-01-01)
  - Total: 37
  - Density: 2.0/km^{2} (5.2/sq mi)
- Time zone: UTC+1 (CET)
  - Summer (DST): UTC+2 (CEST)
- Website: Official website

Garganta del Villar is a municipality located in the province of Ávila, Castile and León, Spain.

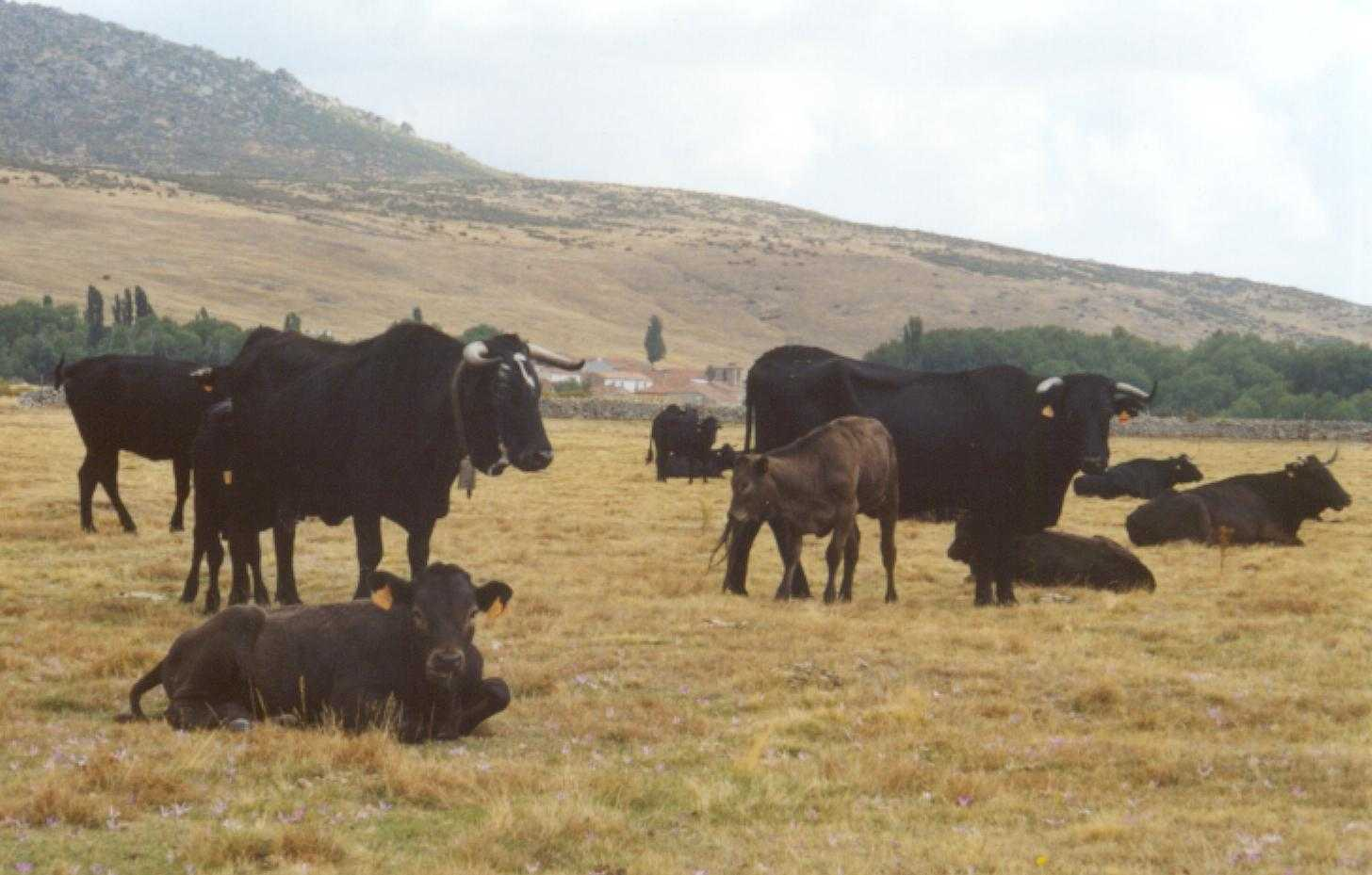
Bulls and cows is the normal view in the landscape of Garganta del Villar. The town is at back.

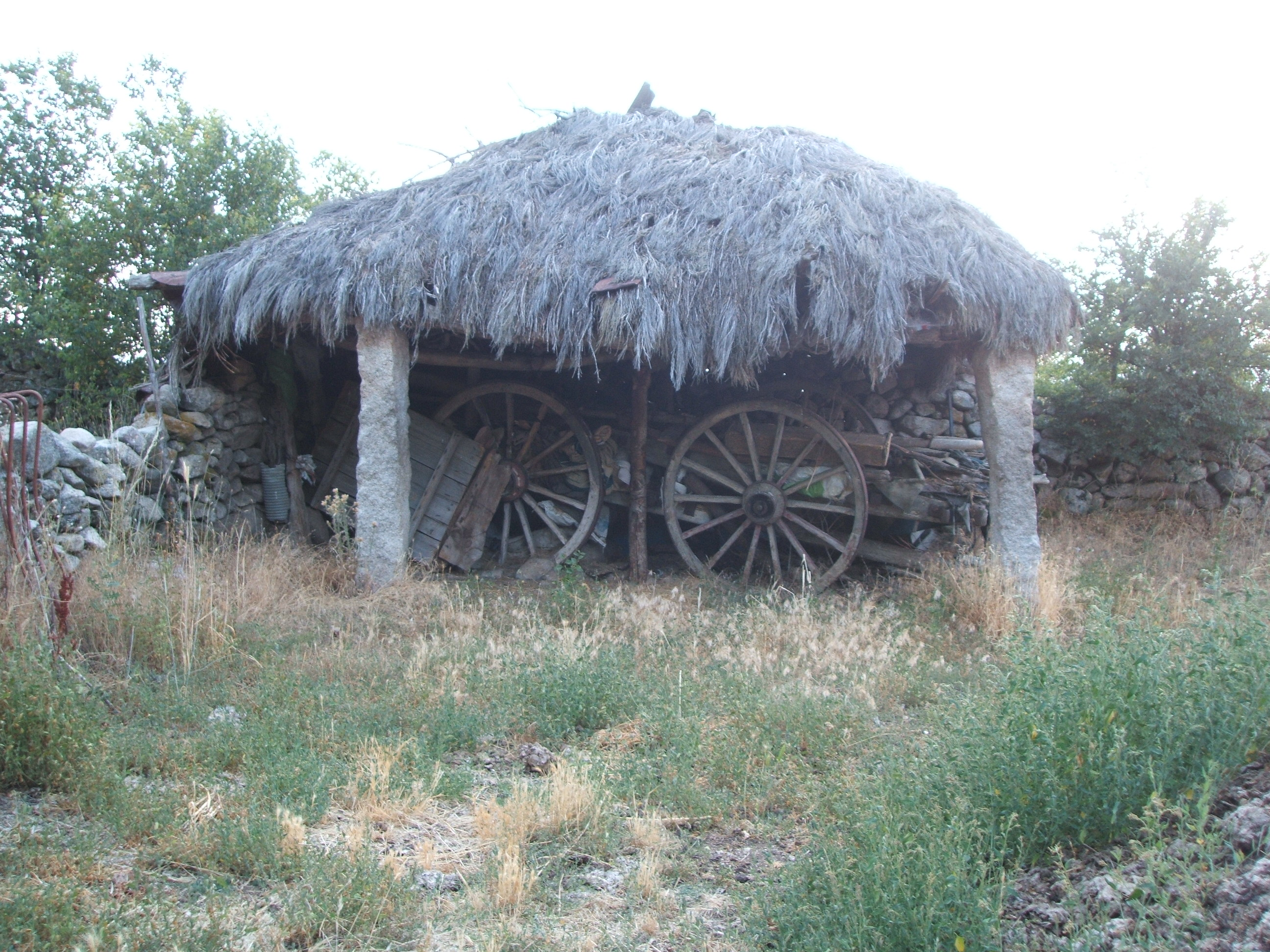
Ox carts.

== Population ==
Historical population
Year	Pop.	±% p.a.
2023	41	—
2024	39	−4.88%
2025	37	−5.13%
Source: INE
