= Muñomer del Peco =

- municipality
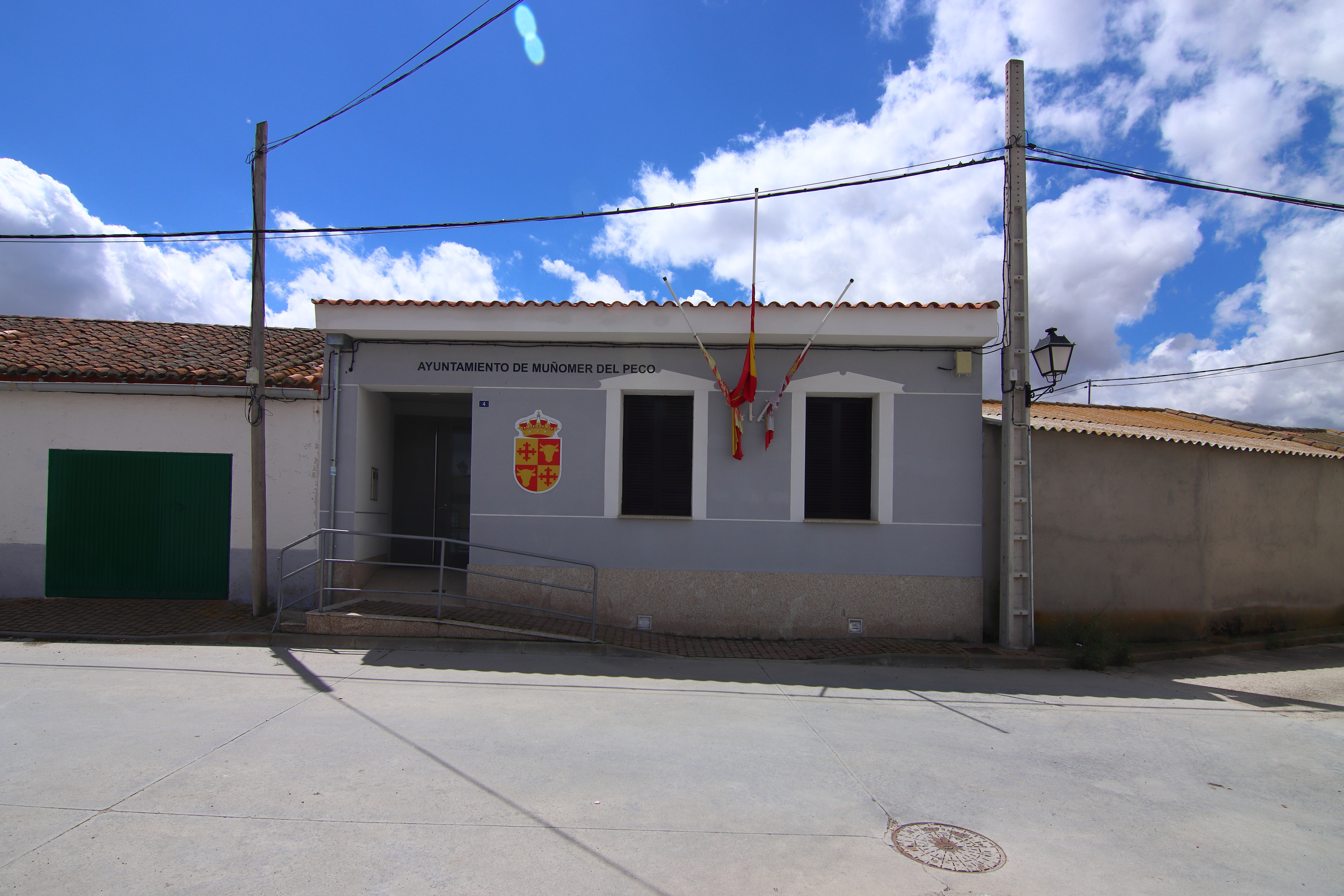
- Town hall

- Flag Coat of arms

- Location in Spain. Muñomer del Peco (Spain)
- Coordinates: 40°51′31″N 4°52′49″W
- Country: Spain
- Autonomous community: Castile and León
- Province: Ávila
- Municipality: Muñomer del Peco

Area
  - Total: 10 km^{2} (3.9 sq mi)

Population (2025-01-01)
  - Total: 113
  - Density: 11/km^{2} (29/sq mi)
- Time zone: UTC+1 (CET)
  - Summer (DST): UTC+2 (CEST)
- Website: Official website

Muñomer del Peco is a municipality located in the province of Ávila, Castile and León, Spain.

== Population ==
Historical population
Year	Pop.	±% p.a.
2023	112	—
2024	111	−0.89%
2025	113	+1.80%
Source: INE
