= Sigeres =

- municipality
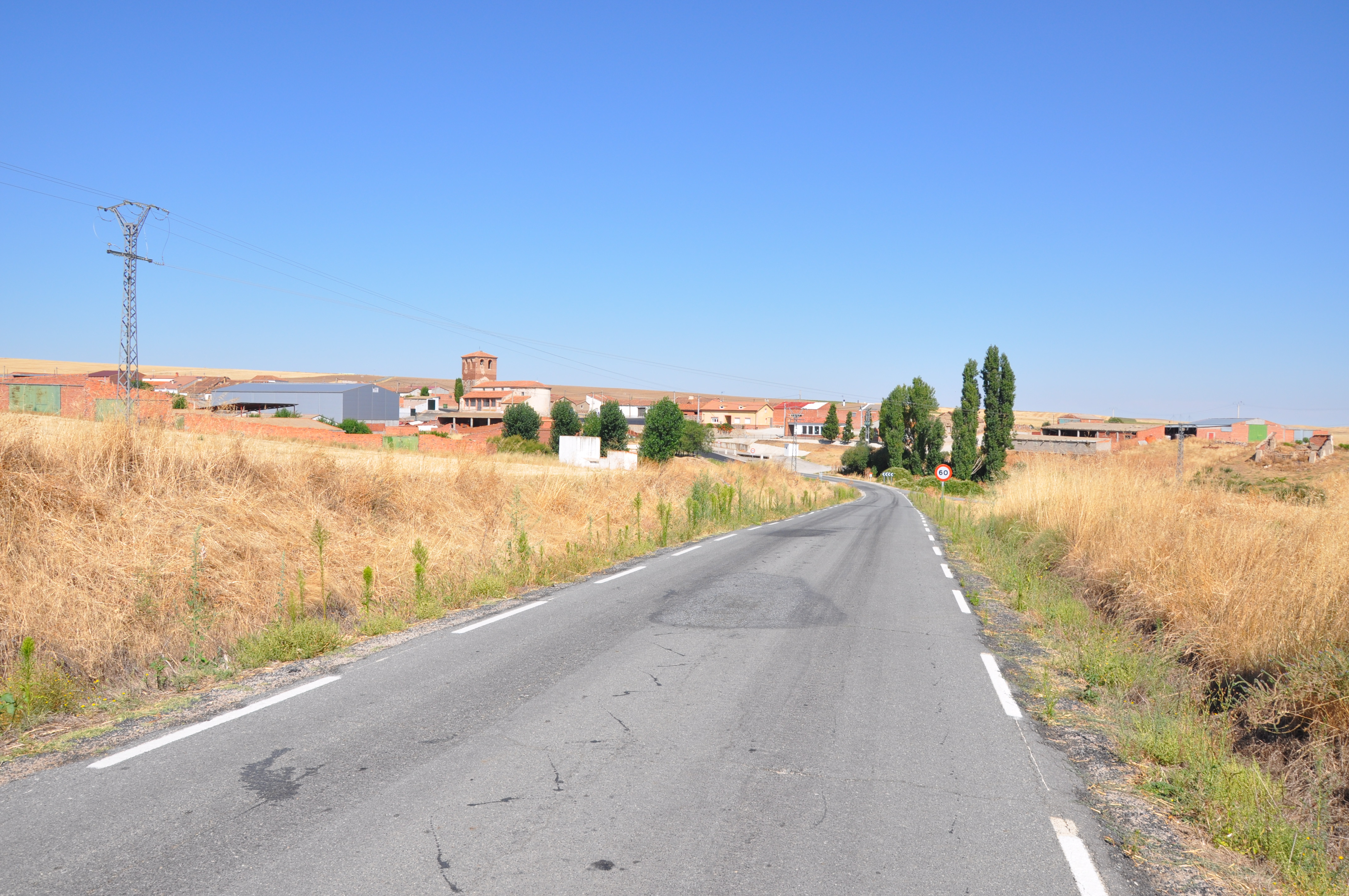
- Panoramic view of Sigeres from the south
- Flag Coat of arms
- Extension of the municipal term within the province of Ávila

- Location in Spain. Sigeres (Spain)
- Coordinates: 40°47′58″N 4°55′57″W
- Country: Spain
- Autonomous community: Castile and León
- Province: Ávila
- Municipality: Sigeres

Area
  - Total: 13 km^{2} (5.0 sq mi)

Population (2025-01-01)
  - Total: 41
  - Density: 3.2/km^{2} (8.2/sq mi)
- Time zone: UTC+1 (CET)
  - Summer (DST): UTC+2 (CEST)
- Website: Official website

Sigeres is a municipality located in the province of Ávila, Castile and León, Spain.

== Population ==
Historical population
Year	Pop.	±% p.a.
2023	41	—
2024	41	+0.00%
2025	41	+0.00%
Source: INE
