= Malpartida de Corneja =

- municipality
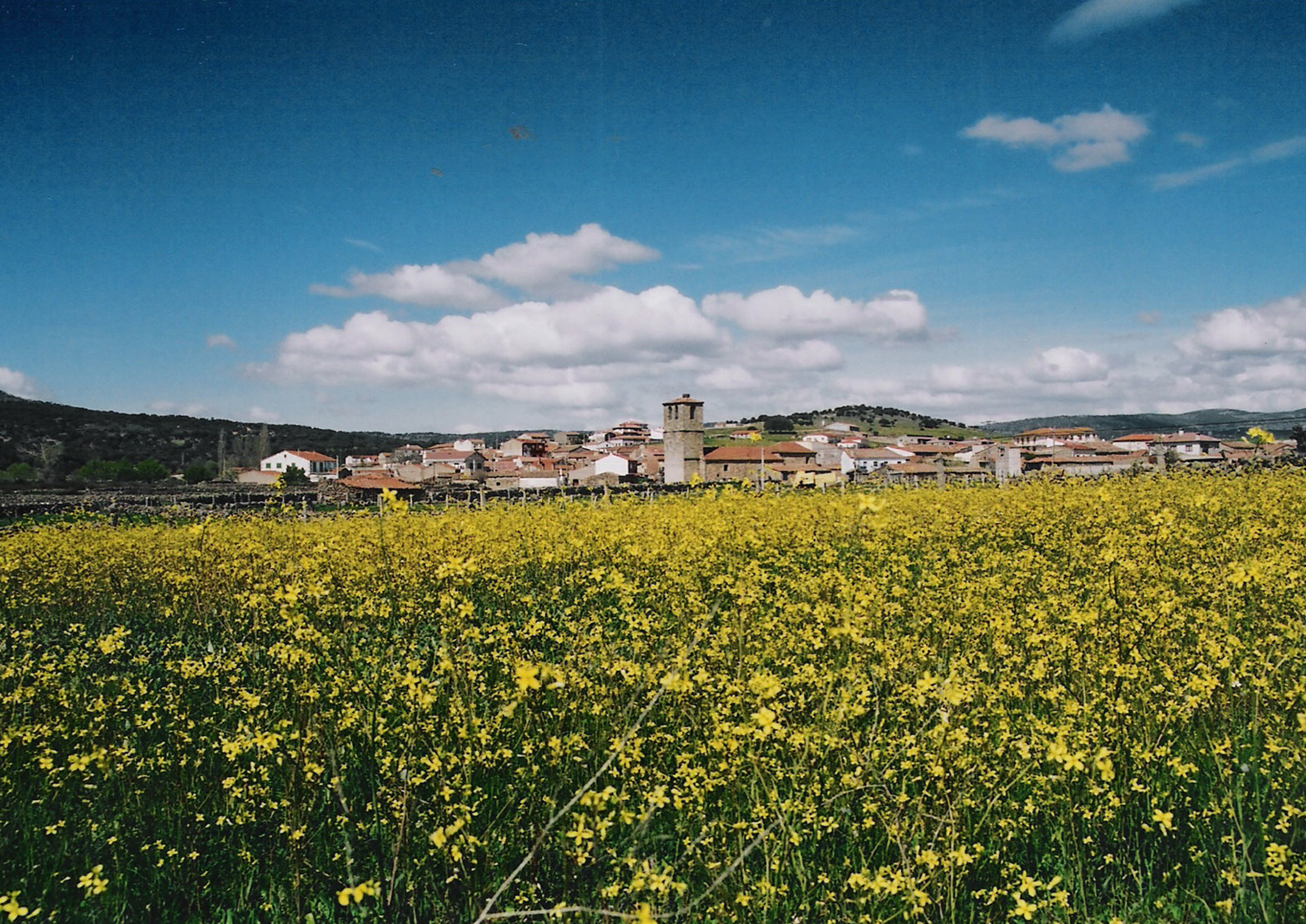
- Flag Coat of arms
- Location in Spain. Malpartida de Corneja (Spain)
- Coordinates: 40°31′16″N 5°21′04″W
- Country: Spain
- Autonomous community: Castile and León
- Province: Ávila
- Municipality: Malpartida de Corneja

Area
  - Total: 19 km^{2} (7.3 sq mi)
- Elevation: 1,090 m (3,580 ft)

Population (2025-01-01)
  - Total: 89
  - Density: 4.7/km^{2} (12/sq mi)
- Time zone: UTC+1 (CET)
  - Summer (DST): UTC+2 (CEST)
- Website: Official website

Malpartida de Corneja is a municipality located in the province of Ávila, Castile and León, Spain.

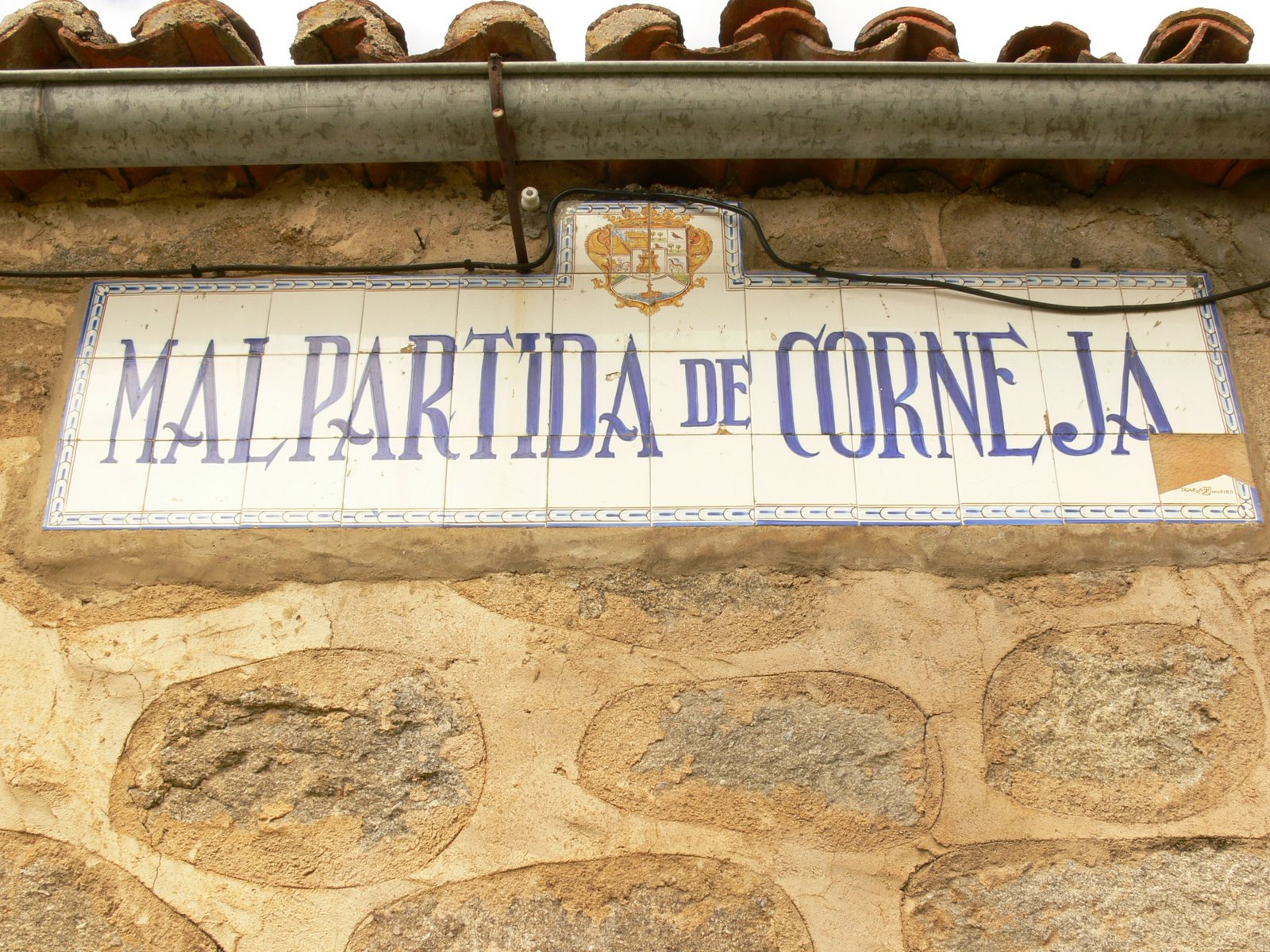

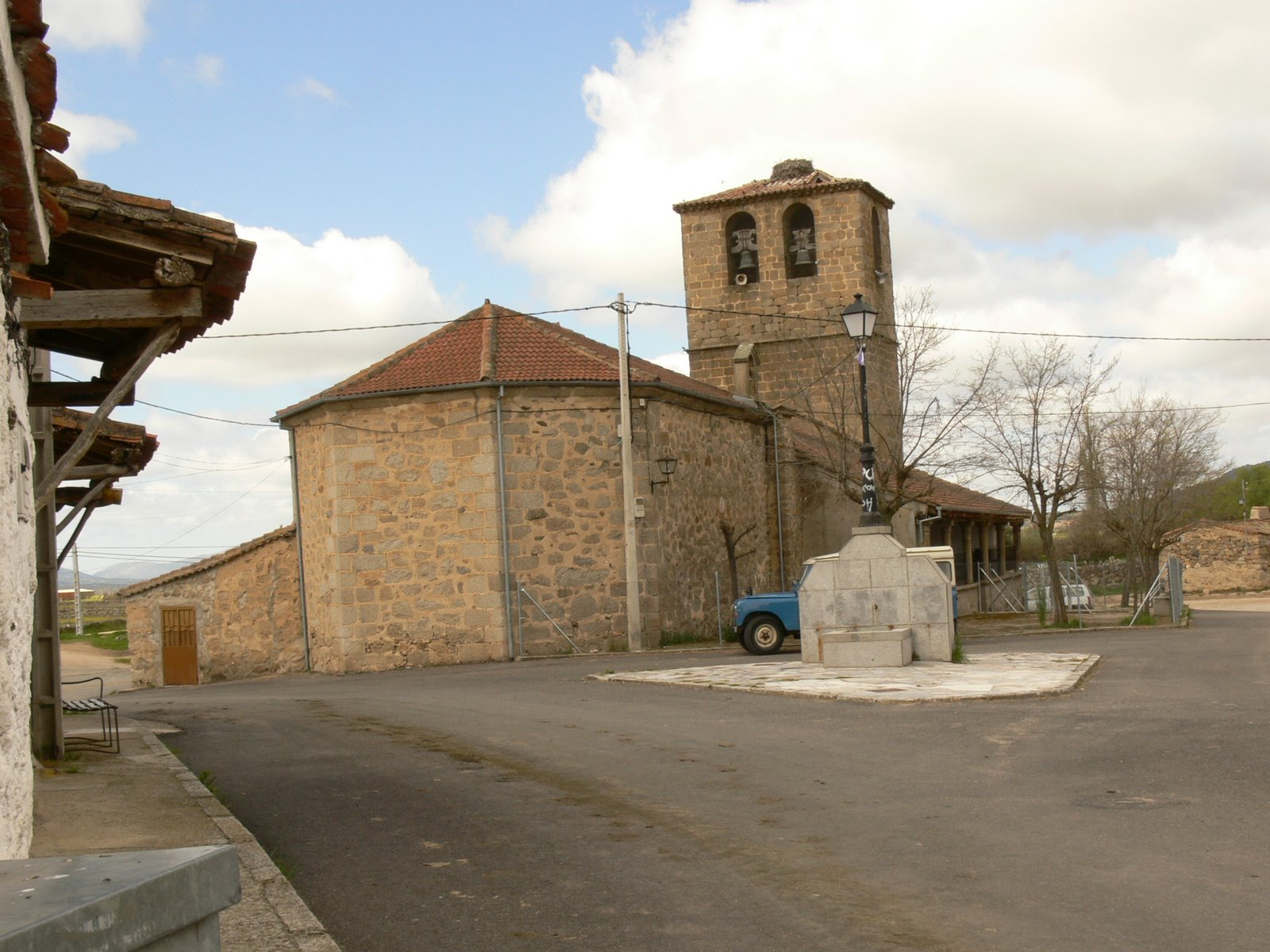
Malpartida de Corneja's parish church.

== Population ==
Historical population
Year	Pop.	±% p.a.
2023	99	—
2024	91	−8.08%
2025	89	−2.20%
Source: INE

== Gallery ==
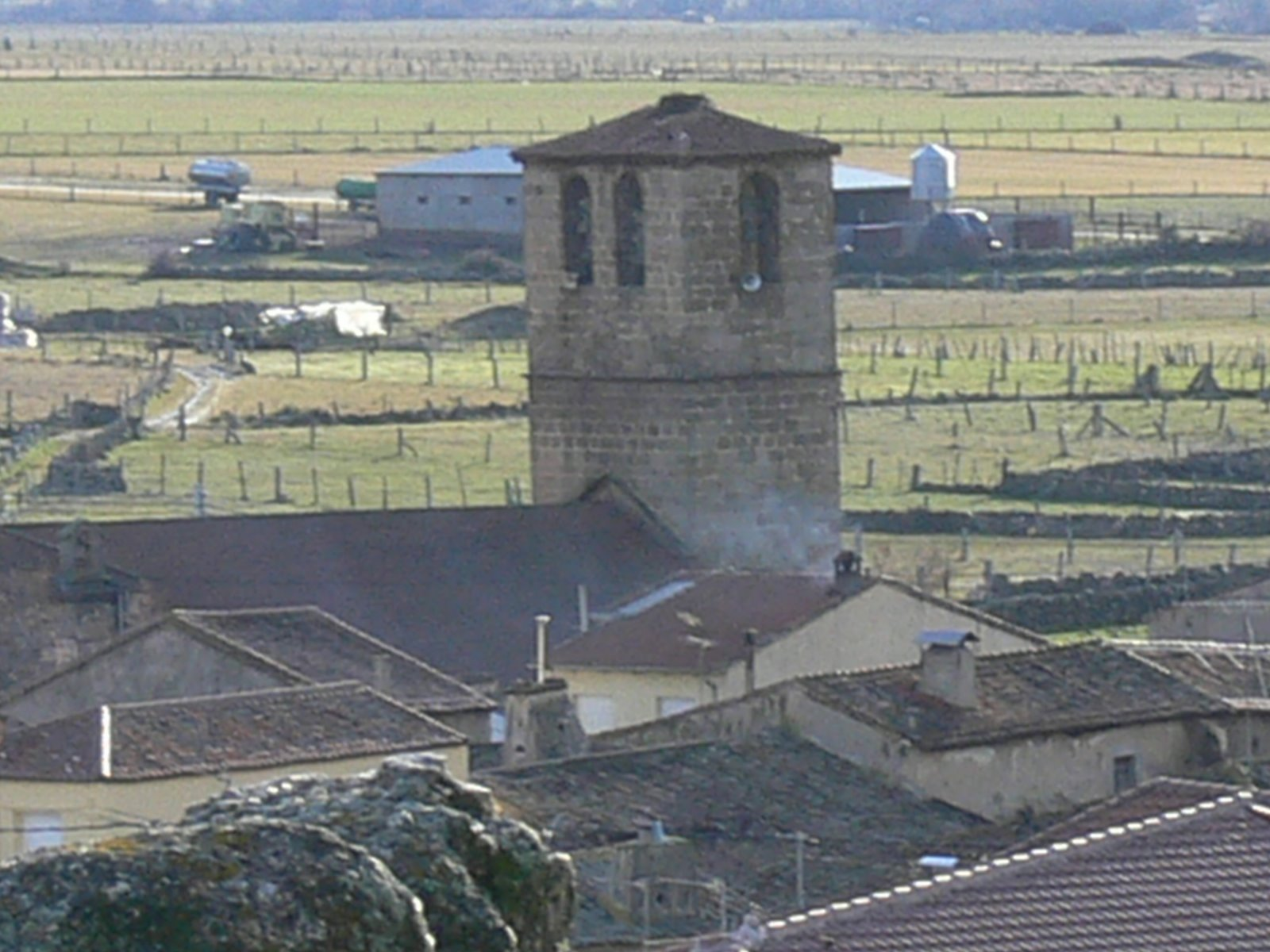

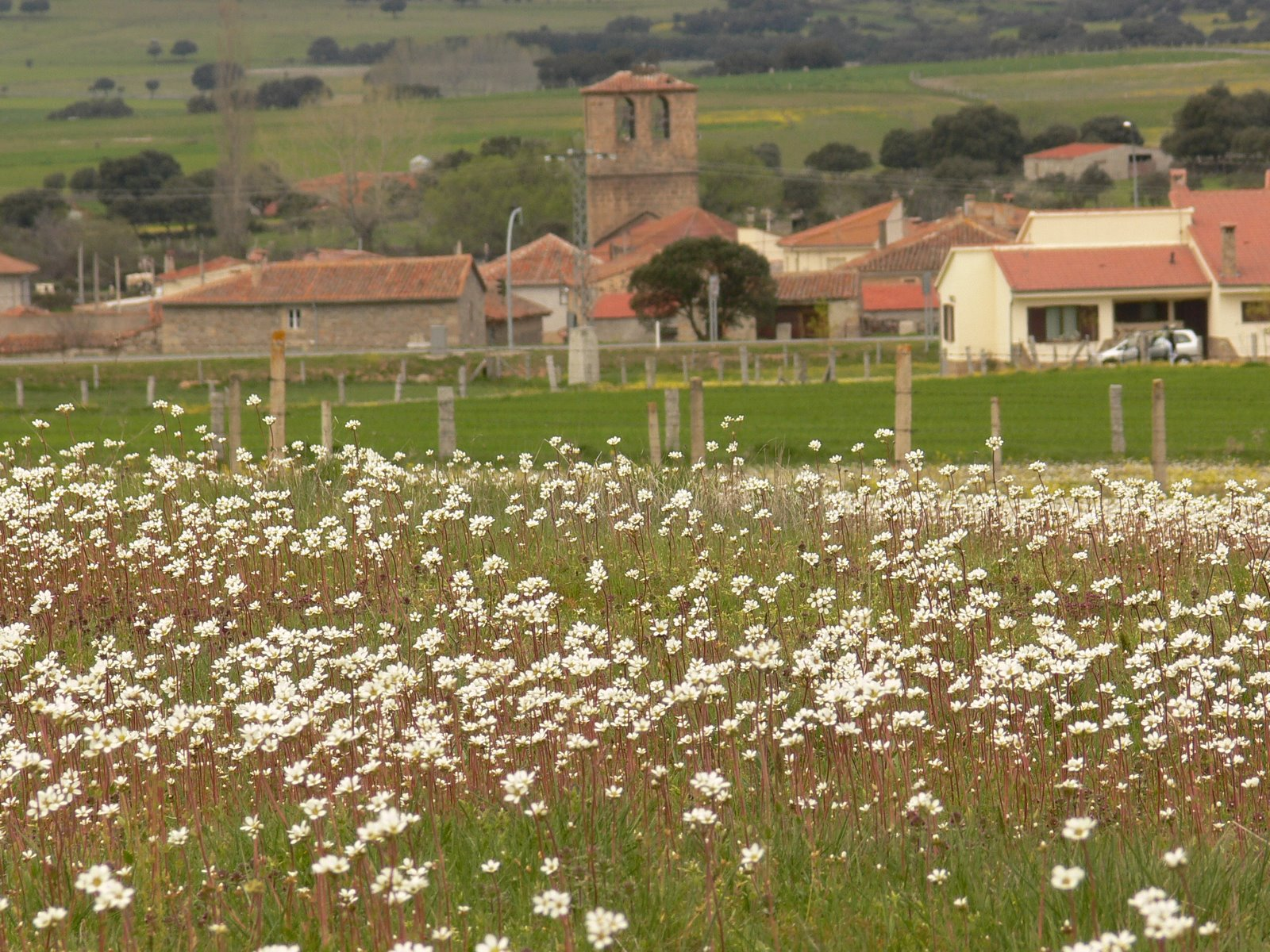

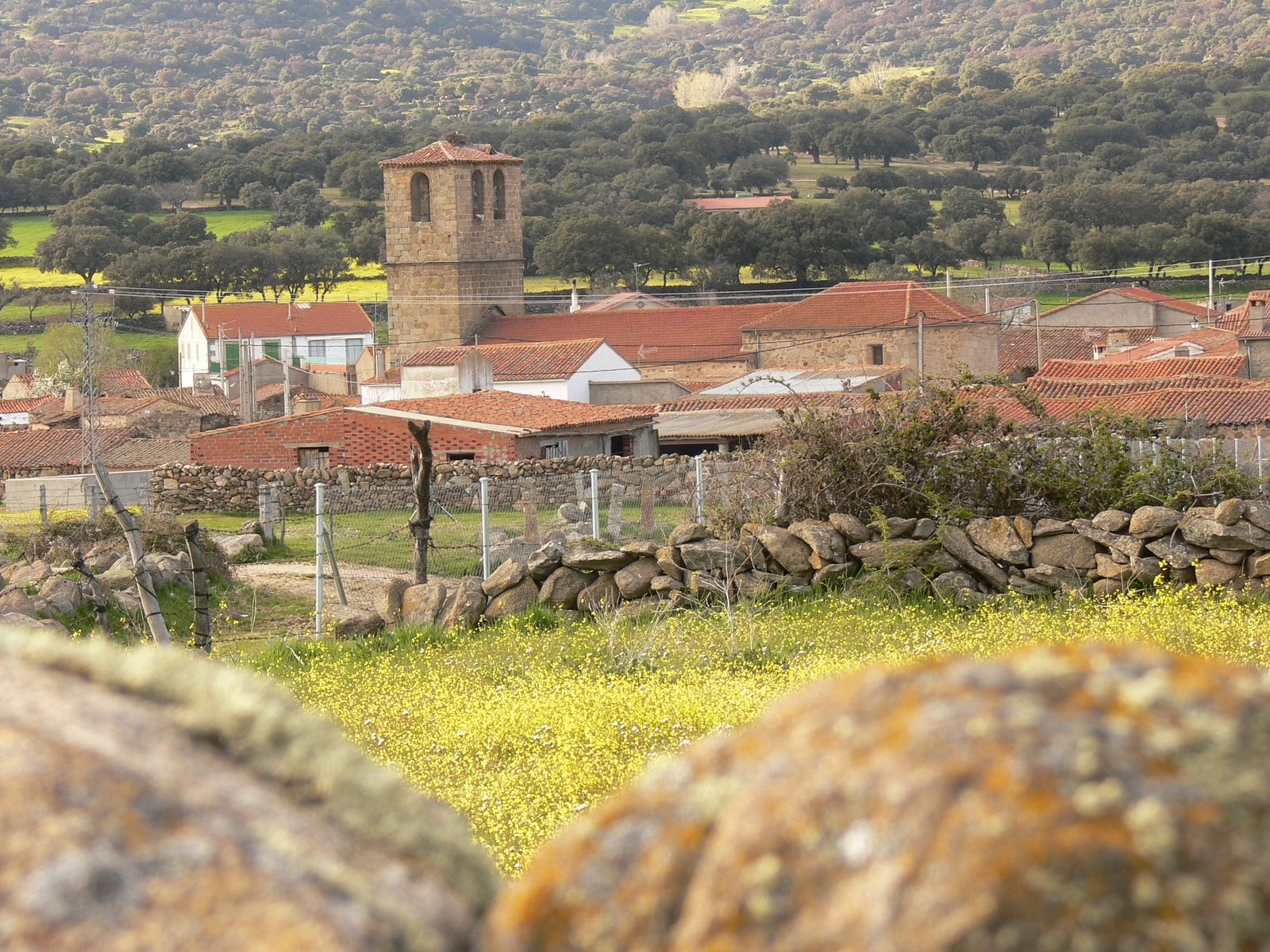

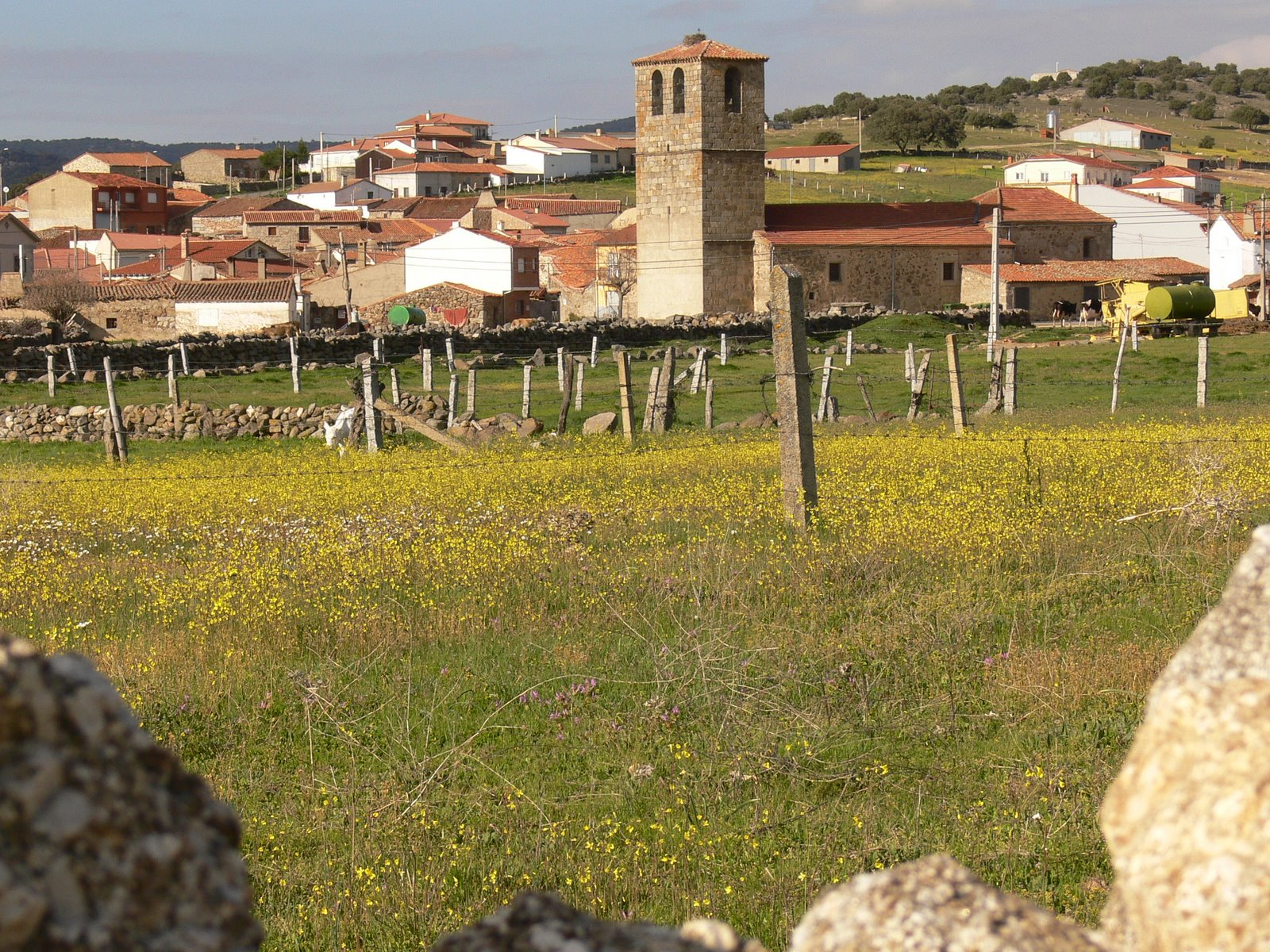

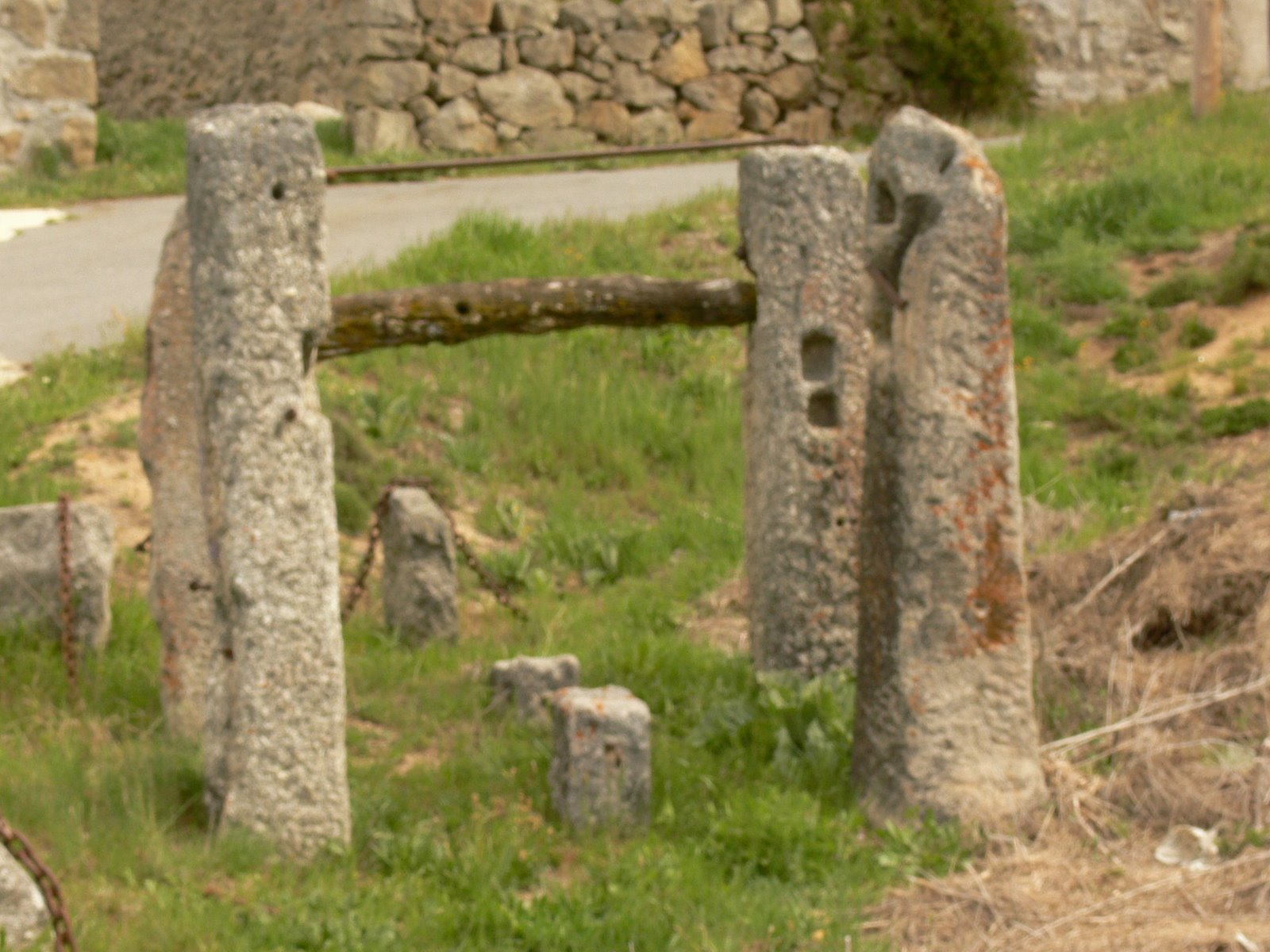

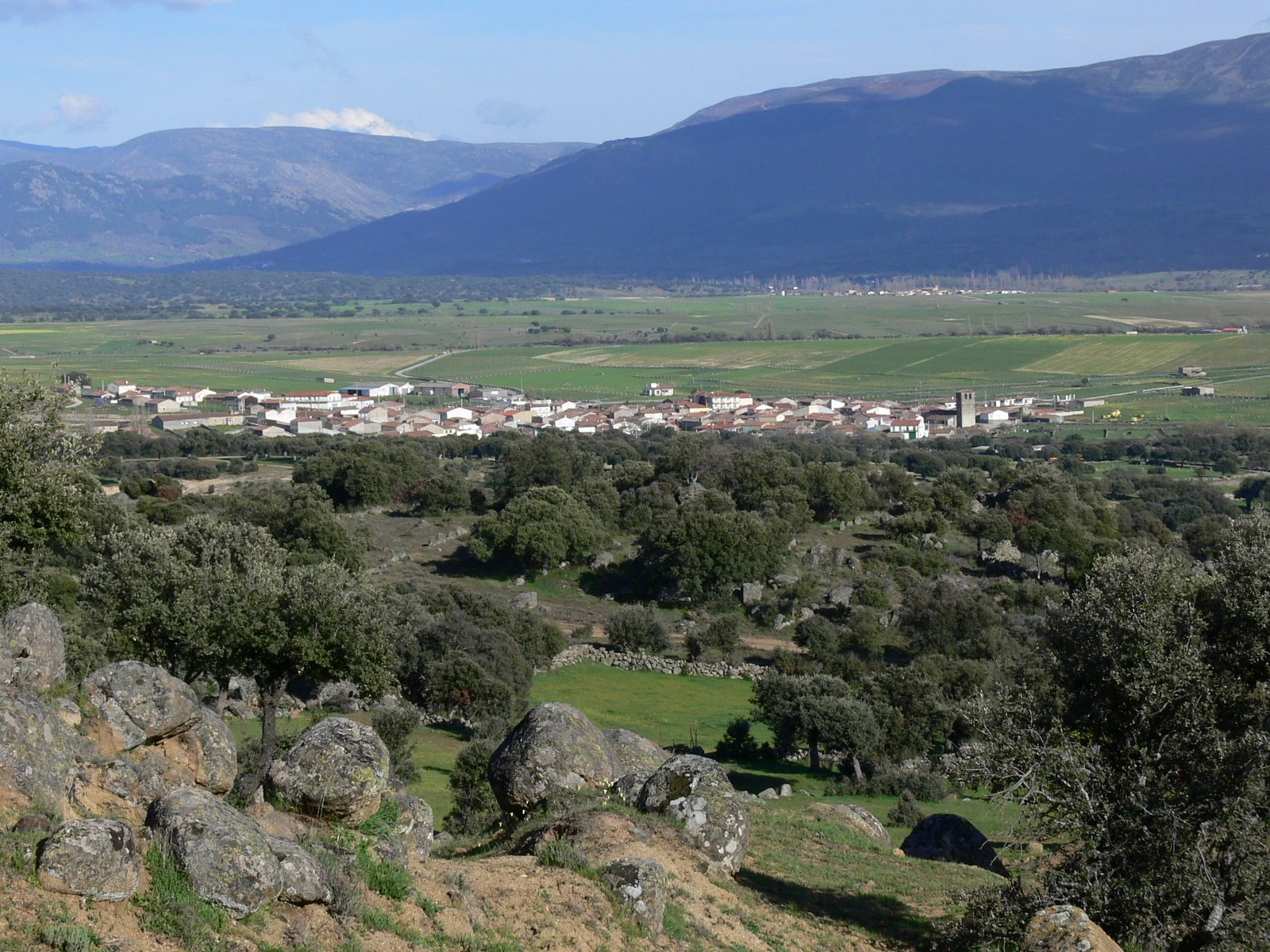

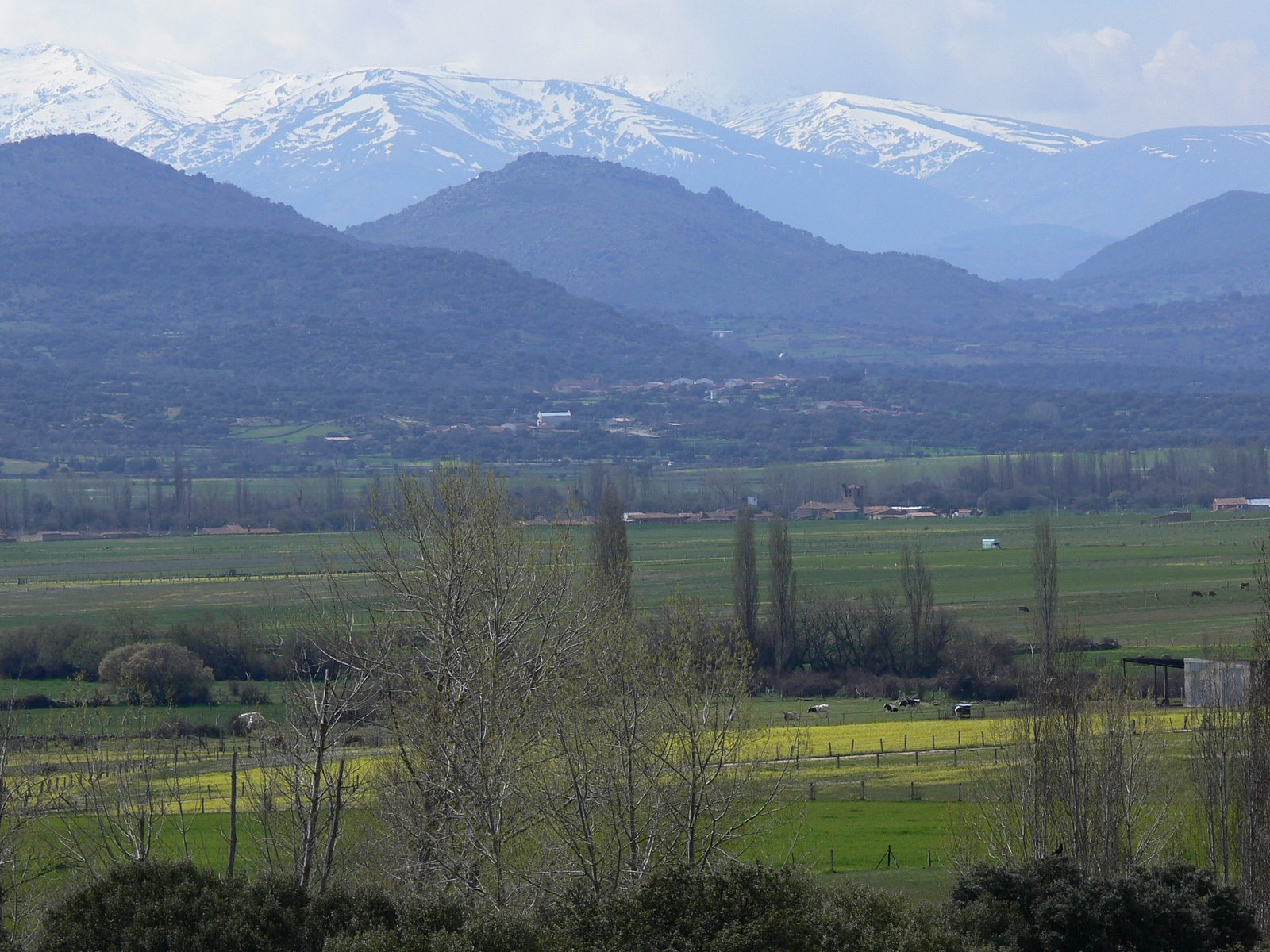
