= Aveinte =

- municipality
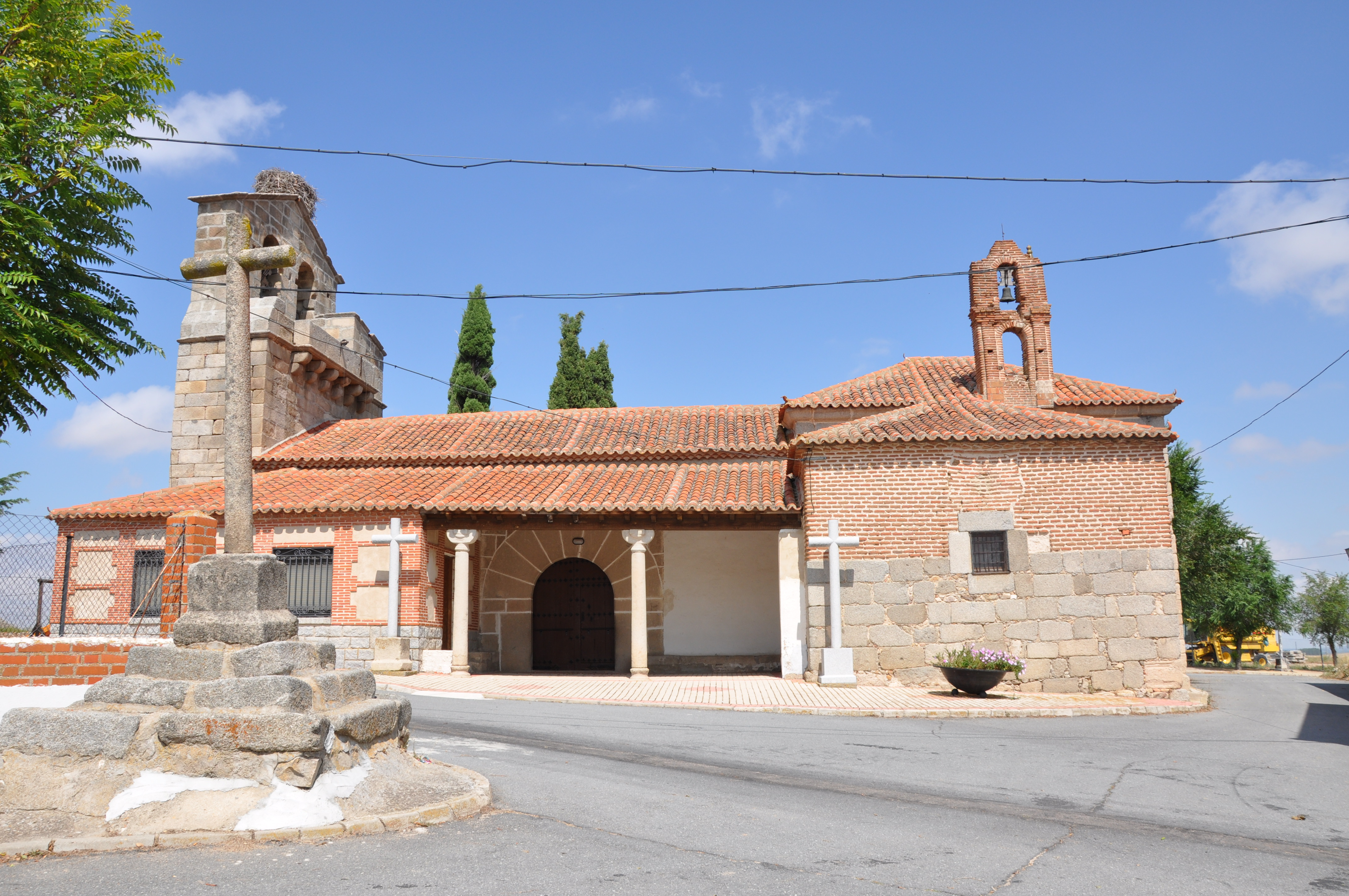
- Parish church of Santo Tomas apostle
- Flag Coat of arms
- Extension of the municipal term within the province of Ávila

- Location in Spain. Aveinte (Spain)
- Coordinates: 40°46′56″N 4°50′15″W
- Country: Spain
- Autonomous community: Castile and León
- Province: Ávila
- Municipality: Aveinte

Area
  - Total: 12.84 km^{2} (4.96 sq mi)
- Elevation: 1,002 m (3,287 ft)

Population (2025-01-01)
  - Total: 67
  - Density: 5.2/km^{2} (14/sq mi)
- Time zone: UTC+1 (CET)
  - Summer (DST): UTC+2 (CEST)
- Website: Official website

Aveinte is a municipality located in the province of Ávila, Castile and León, Spain. According to the 2025 census (INE), the municipality had a population of 67 inhabitants.

== Population ==
Historical population
Year	Pop.	±% p.a.
2023	75	—
2024	73	−2.67%
2025	67	−8.22%
Source: INE
