= San Bartolomé de Corneja =

- Municipality
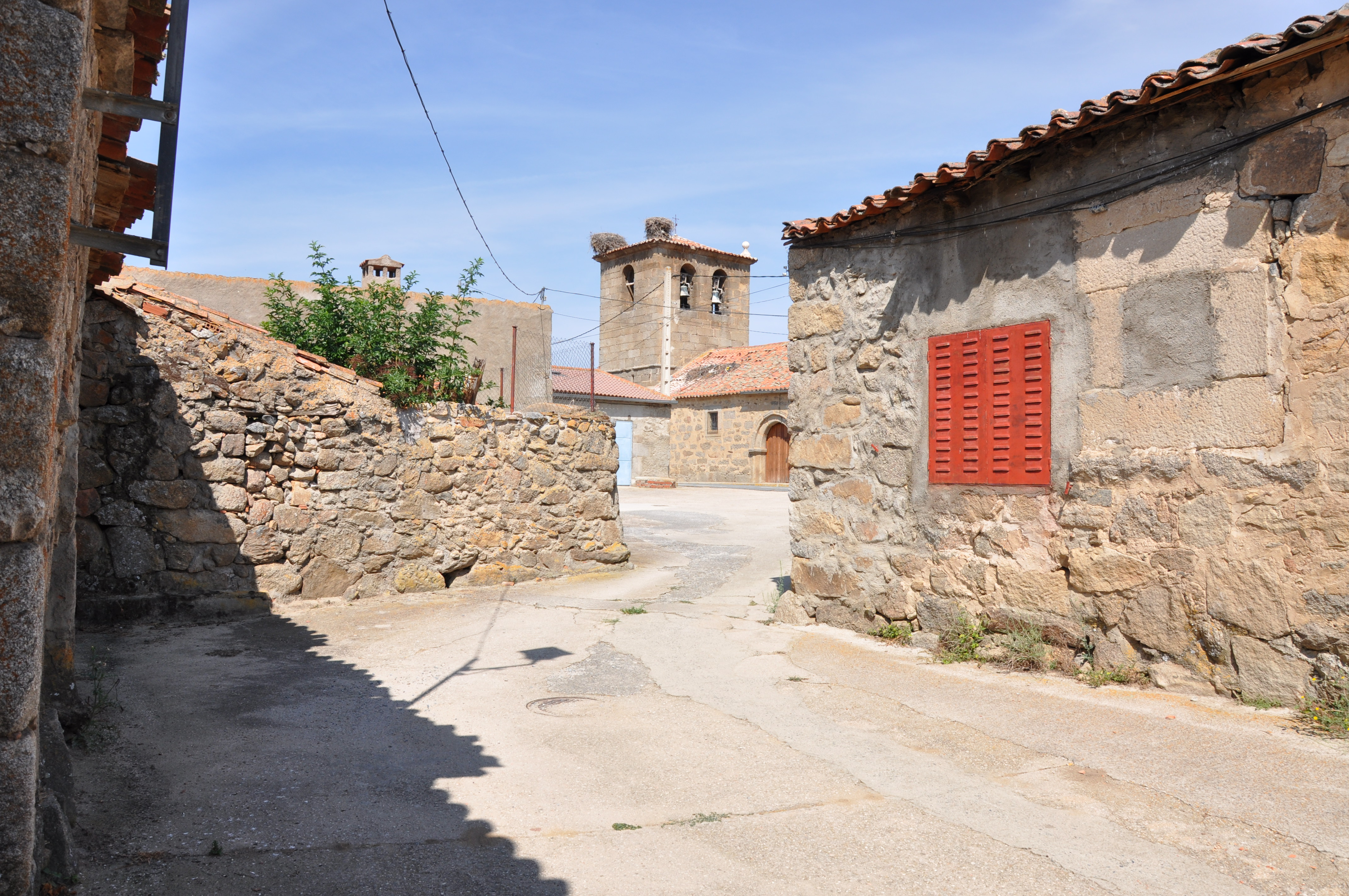
- Interactive map of San Bartolomé de Corneja
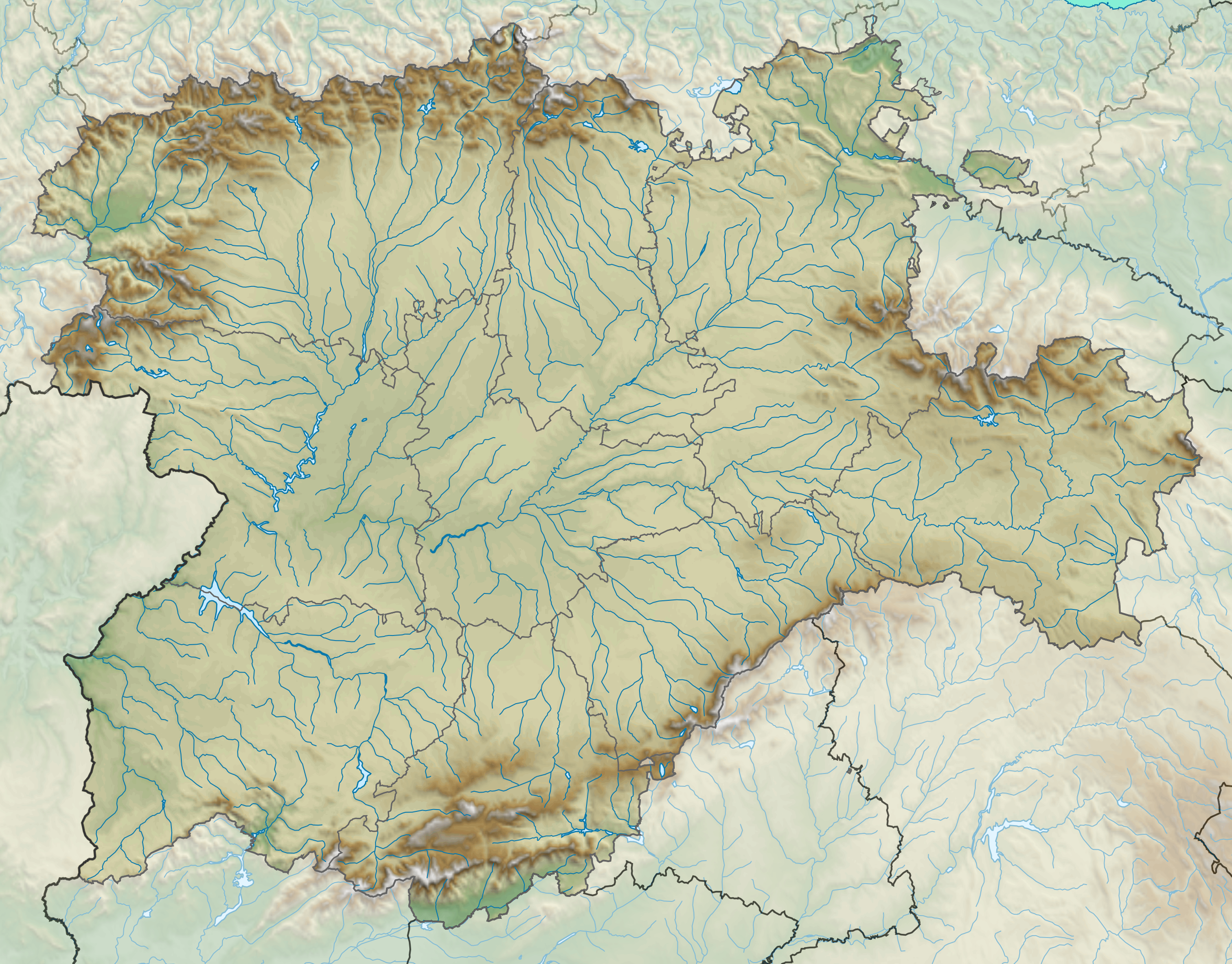
- Location within Castile and León Location within Spain
- Coordinates: 40°29′34″N 5°23′07″W
- Country: Spain
- Autonomous community: Castile and León
- Province: Ávila

Area
  - Total: 7 km^{2} (2.7 sq mi)

Population (2025-01-01)
  - Total: 32
  - Density: 4.6/km^{2} (12/sq mi)
- Time zone: UTC+1 (CET)
  - Summer (DST): UTC+2 (CEST)
- Website: Official website

San Bartolomé de Corneja is a municipality located in the province of Ávila, Castile and León, Spain.

== Population ==
Historical population
Year	Pop.	±% p.a.
2023	37	—
2024	35	−5.41%
2025	32	−8.57%
Source: INE
