= Albornos =

- municipality
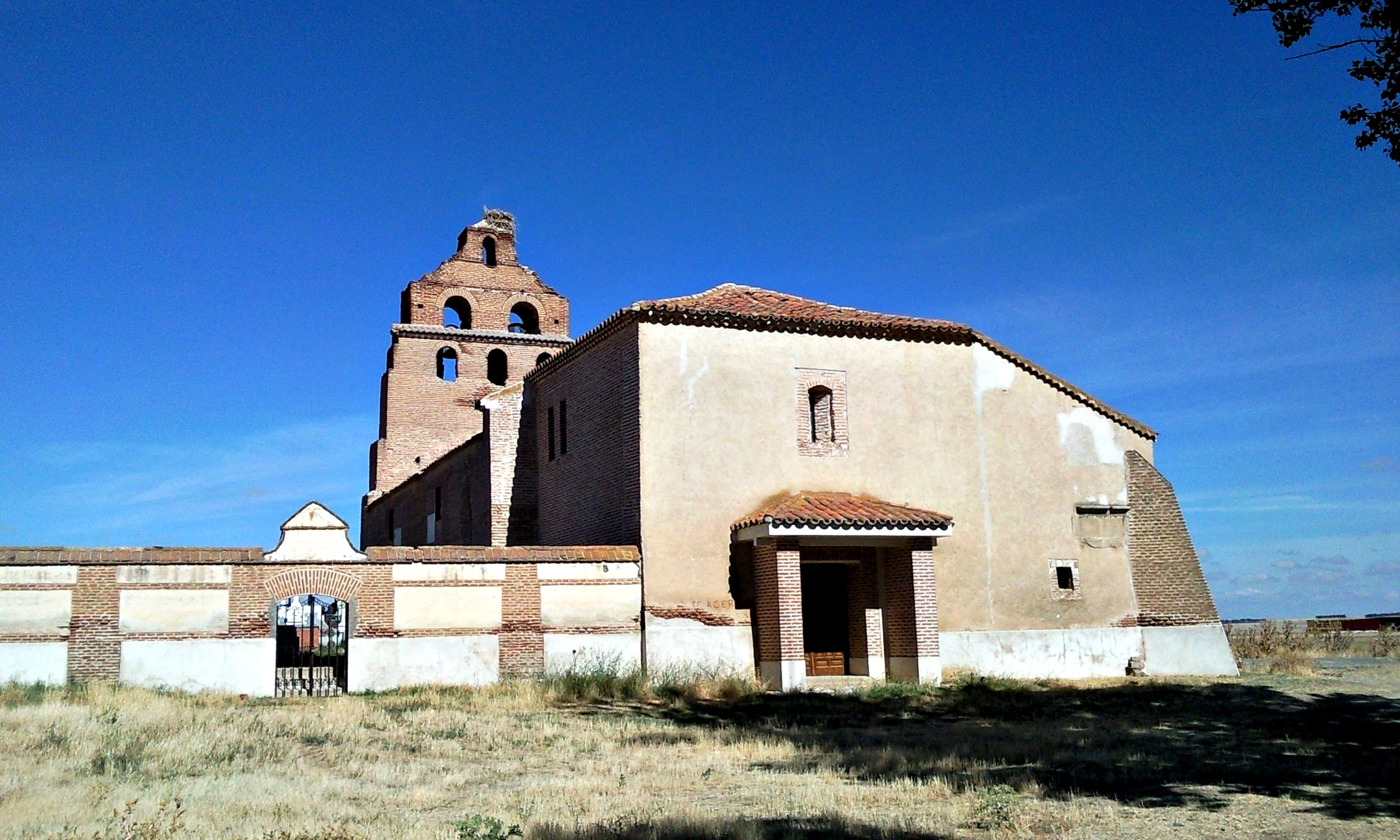
- Albornos Church

- Coat of arms

- Location in Spain. Albornos (Spain)
- Coordinates: 40°50′19″N 4°52′53″W
- Country: Spain
- Autonomous community: Castile and León
- Province: Ávila
- Municipality: Albornos

Area
  - Total: 17.15 km^{2} (6.62 sq mi)
- Elevation: 911 m (2,989 ft)

Population (2025-01-01)
  - Total: 170
  - Density: 9.9/km^{2} (26/sq mi)
- Time zone: UTC+1 (CET)
  - Summer (DST): UTC+2 (CEST)
- Website: Official website

Albornos is a municipality located in the province of Ávila, Castile and León, Spain. According to the 2011 census (INE), the municipality had a population of 218 inhabitants.
