= Narrillos del Álamo =

- municipality
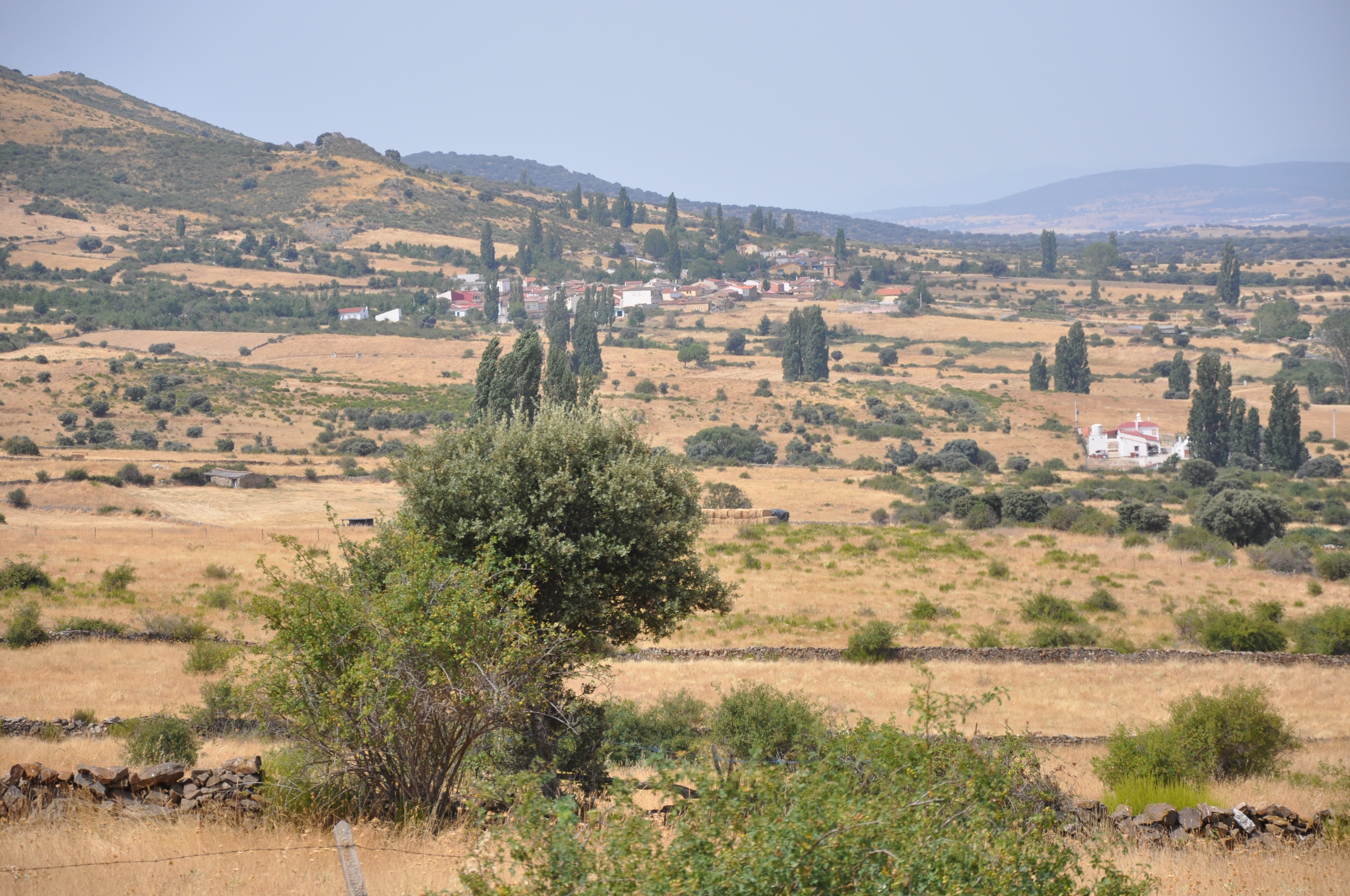
- Narrillos del Álamo from the east

- Flag Coat of arms

- Municipalities in the province of Ávila

- Location in Spain. Narrillos del Álamo (Spain)
- Coordinates: 40°34′01″N 5°28′01″W
- Country: Spain
- Autonomous community: Castile and León
- Province: Ávila
- Municipality: Narrillos del Álamo

Area
  - Total: 29 km^{2} (11 sq mi)

Population (2025-01-01)
  - Total: 56
  - Density: 1.9/km^{2} (5.0/sq mi)
- Time zone: UTC+1 (CET)
  - Summer (DST): UTC+2 (CEST)
- Website: Official website

Narrillos del Álamo is a municipality located in the province of Ávila, Castile and León, Spain.

== Population ==
Historical population
Year	Pop.	±% p.a.
2023	60	—
2024	59	−1.67%
2025	56	−5.08%
Source: INE
