= Donvidas =

- municipality
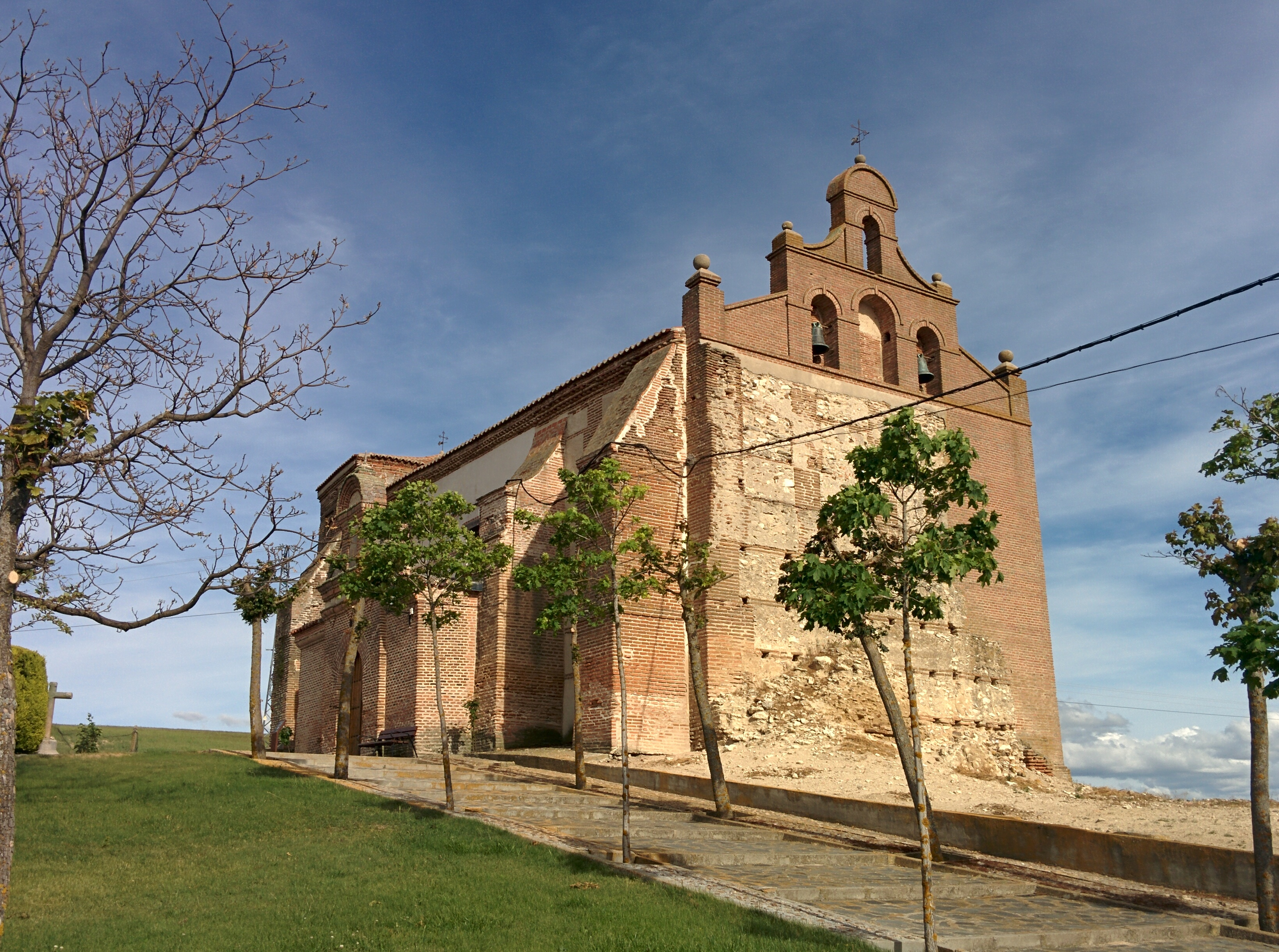
- Flag Coat of arms
- Location in Spain. Donvidas (Spain)
- Coordinates: 41°05′21″N 4°48′28″W
- Country: Spain
- Autonomous community: Castile and León
- Province: Ávila
- Municipality: Donvidas

Area
  - Total: 11.48 km^{2} (4.43 sq mi)
- Elevation: 868 m (2,848 ft)

Population (2025-01-01)
  - Total: 31
  - Density: 2.7/km^{2} (7.0/sq mi)
- Time zone: UTC+1 (CET)
  - Summer (DST): UTC+2 (CEST)
- Website: Official website

Donvidas is a municipality located in the province of Ávila, Castile and León, Spain.

== Population ==
Historical population
Year	Pop.	±% p.a.
2023	31	—
2024	36	+16.13%
2025	31	−13.89%
Source: INE
