= Narrillos del Rebollar =

- municipality
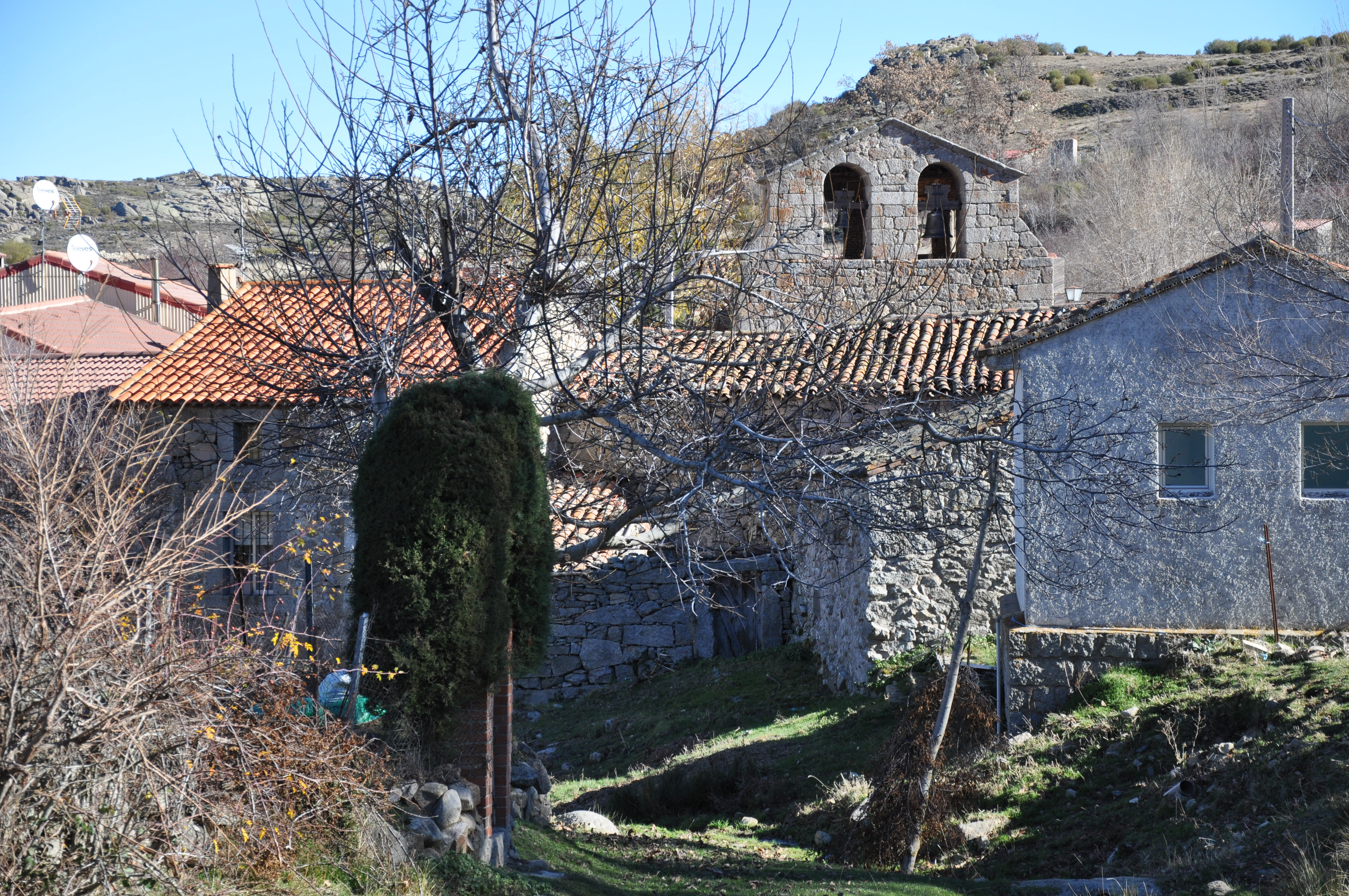
- Panorama
- Flag Coat of arms
- Location in Spain. Narrillos del Rebollar (Spain)
- Coordinates: 40°39′52″N 4°57′53″W
- Country: Spain
- Autonomous community: Castile and León
- Province: Ávila
- Municipality: Narrillos del Rebollar

Area
  - Total: 17 km^{2} (6.6 sq mi)

Population (2025-01-01)
  - Total: 34
  - Density: 2.0/km^{2} (5.2/sq mi)
- Time zone: UTC+1 (CET)
  - Summer (DST): UTC+2 (CEST)
- Website: Official website

Narrillos del Rebollar is a municipality located in the province of Ávila, Castile and León, Spain.

== Population ==
Historical population
| Year | Pop. | ±% p.a. |
|---|---|---|
| 2023 | 37 | — |
| 2024 | 34 | −8.11% |
| 2025 | 34 | +0.00% |
Source: INE
