= San Juan de la Nava =

- municipality
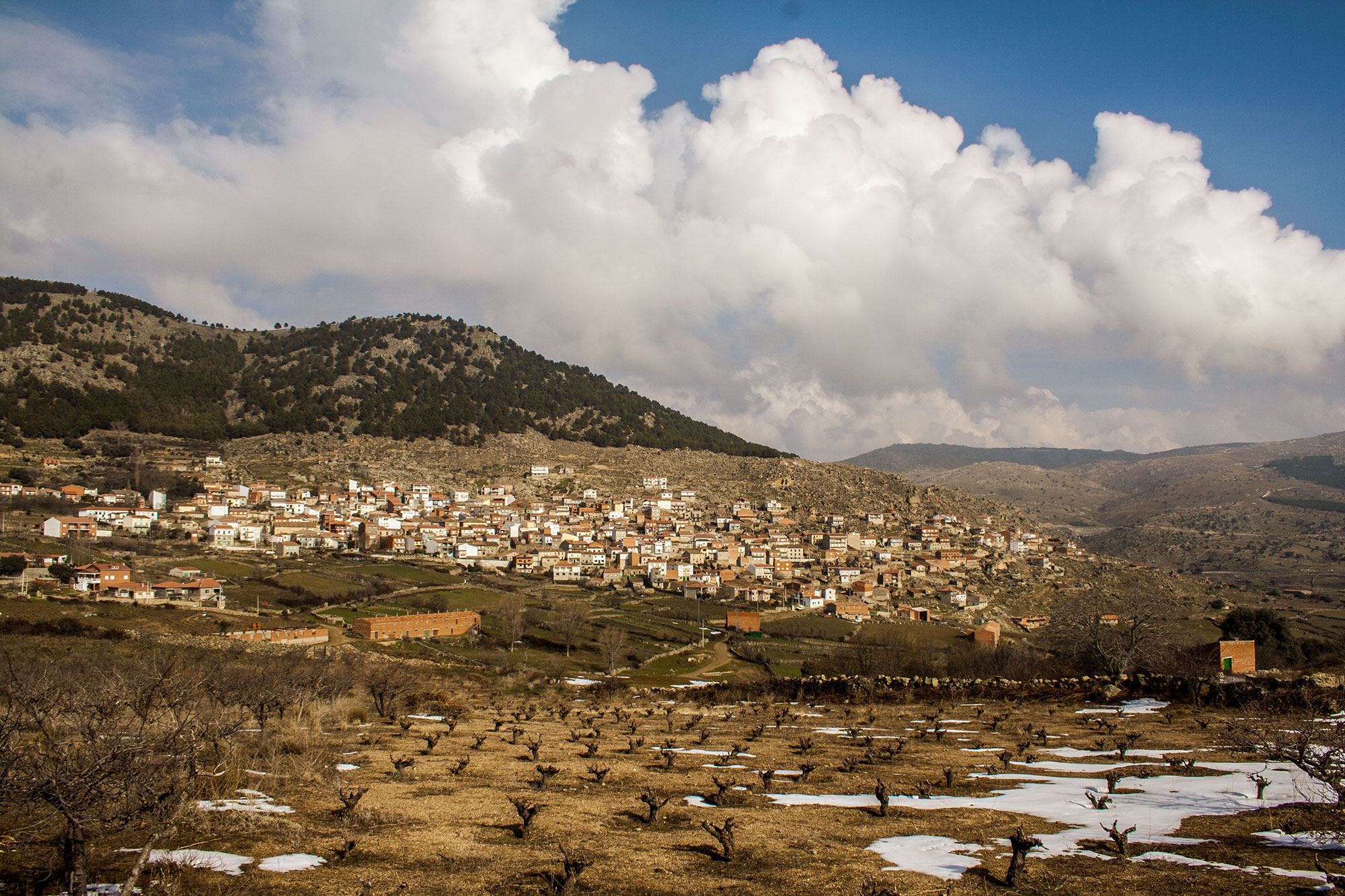
- View of San Juan de la Nava

- Flag Coat of arms

- Location in Spain. San Juan de la Nava (Spain)
- Coordinates: 40°28′45″N 4°40′55″W
- Country: Spain
- Autonomous community: Castile and León
- Province: Ávila
- Municipality: San Juan de la Nava

Area
  - Total: 60 km^{2} (23 sq mi)
- Elevation: 1 m (3.3 ft)

Population (2025-01-01)
  - Total: 422
  - Density: 7.0/km^{2} (18/sq mi)
- Time zone: UTC+1 (CET)
  - Summer (DST): UTC+2 (CEST)
- Website: Official website

San Juan de la Nava is a municipality located in the province of Ávila, Castile and León, Spain.

== Population ==
Historical population
Year	Pop.	±% p.a.
2023	435	—
2024	426	−2.07%
2025	422	−0.94%
Source: INE
