= Province of Ávila =

Province of Spain

Province of Ávila Provincia de Ávila
- Province
- Flag Coat of arms

- Location of the Province of Ávila in Spain
- Coordinates: 40°35′N 5°00′W
- Country: Spain
- Autonomous community: Castile and León
- Capital: Ávila
- Municipalities: 248 (list)

Government
  - Type: Diputación
  - Body: Provincial Deputation of Ávila
  - President: Carlos García González (PP)

Area
  - Total: 8,049.04 km^{2} (3,107.75 sq mi)
  - Rank: 30th in Spain
- 1.6% of Spain
- Highest elevation (Almanzor): 2,592 m (8,504 ft)
- Lowest elevation (Tiétar): 400 m (1,300 ft)

Population (2025)
  - Total: 160,738
  - Rank: 46th in Spain
  - Density: 19.9698/km^{2} (51.7216/sq mi)
- 0.3% of Spain
- Demonym: abulense
- Website: www.diputacionavila.es

The Province of Ávila (Spanish: Provincia de Ávila [ˈaβila]) is a province of central-western Spain, in the southern part of the autonomous community of Castile and León. Its capital is the city of Ávila. It is bordered on the south by the provinces of Toledo and Cáceres, on the west by Salamanca, on the north by Valladolid, and on the east by Segovia and Madrid.

It has a population of 160,738 in an area of 8,049.04 square kilometres (3,107.75 sq mi) across its 248 municipalities.

== History ==
The first recorded inhabitants of Ávila were the Celts, who left behind a number of large stone statues of bulls called Verracos, with the largest number of surviving examples in Ávila. The area of the province was conquered by the Romans around 192 B.C. After the Roman Empire fell, the area became part of the Visigothic Kingdom, and it is from this period we have many of the earliest records of the towns of Ávila.

The population of the territory comprising the current-day province of Ávila greatly decreased since the late 16th century and the first half of the 17th century, taking over nearly two centuries to recover the late 16th century population.

== Geography ==
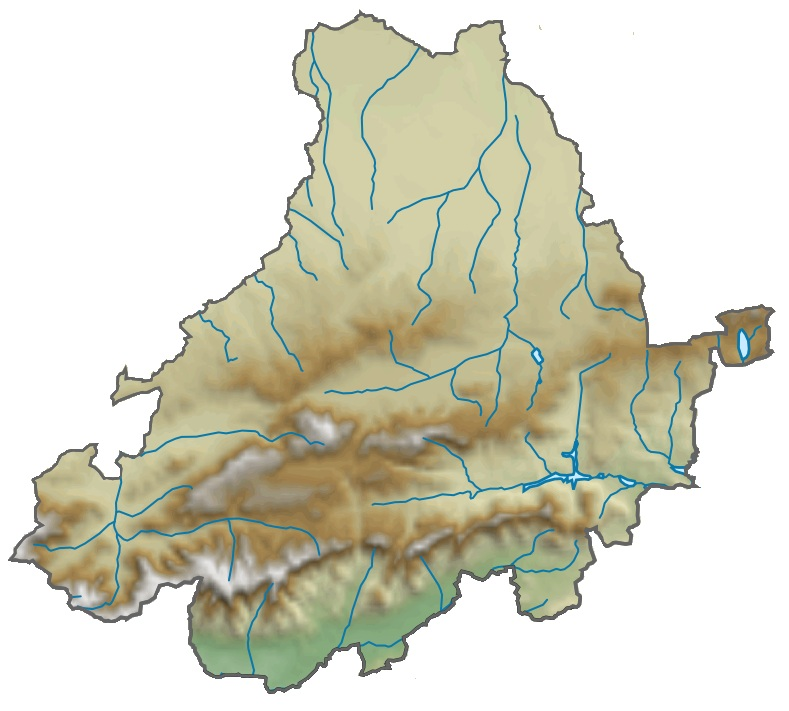
Relief map

Ávila is naturally divided into two sections, differing completely in soil and climate. The northern portion is generally level; the soil is of indifferent quality, strong and marly in a few places, but rocky in all the valleys of the Sierra de Ávila; and the climate alternates from severe cold in winter to extreme heat in summer. The population of this part is mainly agricultural. The southern division, however, is one mass of rugged granitic sierras, interspersed with sheltered and well-watered valleys, abounding with rich vegetation.

The winter, especially in the elevated region of the Paramera and the wastelands of Ávila, is long and severe, but the climate is not unhealthy.

The principal mountain chains are the Guadarrama, separating this province from Madrid; the Paramera and Sierra de Ávila, west of the Guadarrama; and the vast wall of the Sierra de Gredos along the southern frontier, where its outstanding peaks rise from around 6,000 to 8,000 feet (1,800 to 2,400 m). Pico Almanzor is the highest point. The ridges which ramify from the Paramera are covered with valuable forests of beeches, oaks and firs, presenting a striking contrast to the bare peaks of the Sierra de Gredos.

The main rivers stemming from the Sierra de Gredos are the Alberche, the Tiétar, and the Tormes. The first two belong to the Tagus basin, while the latter belongs to the Douro catchment area. Meanwhile, the Adaja, another Douro tributary whose source lies at the cut-off point of the Sierra de Ávila and La Serrota, carries little water in the Summer.

Altitude ranges from the 400 metres above sea level in the Tiétar river through to the 2592 metres of the Pico Almanzor.

== Municipalities ==
The province has 248 municipalities:

- Adanero
- La Adrada
- Albornos
- Aldeanueva de Santa Cruz
- Aldeaseca
- La Aldehuela
- Amavida
- El Arenal
- Arenas de San Pedro
- Arevalillo
- Arévalo
- Aveinte
- Avellaneda
- Ávila
- El Barco de Ávila
- El Barraco
- Barromán
- Becedas
- Becedillas
- Bercial de Zapardiel
- Las Berlanas
- Bernuy-Zapardiel
- Berrocalejo de Aragona
- Blascomillán
- Blasconuño de Matacabras
- Blascosancho
- El Bohodón
- Bohoyo
- Bonilla de la Sierra
- Brabos
- Bularros
- Burgohondo
- Cabezas de Alambre
- Cabezas del Pozo
- Cabezas del Villar
- Cabizuela
- Canales
- Candeleda
- Cantiveros
- Cardeñosa
- La Carrera
- Casas del Puerto
- Casasola
- Casavieja
- Casillas
- Castellanos de Zapardiel
- Cebreros
- Cepeda la Mora
- Chamartín
- Cillán
- Cisla
- La Colilla
- Collado de Contreras
- Collado del Mirón
- Constanzana
- Crespos
- Cuevas del Valle
- Diego del Carpio
- Donjimeno
- Donvidas
- Espinosa de los Caballeros
- Flores de Ávila
- Fontiveros
- Fresnedilla
- El Fresno
- Fuente el Saúz
- Fuentes de Año
- Gallegos de Altamiros
- Gallegos de Sobrinos
- Garganta del Villar
- Gavilanes
- Gemuño
- Gilbuena
- Gil García
- Gimialcón
- Gotarrendura
- Grandes y San Martín
- Guisando
- Gutierre-Muñoz
- Hernansancho
- Herradón de Pinares
- Herreros de Suso
- Higuera de las Dueñas
- La Hija de Dios
- La Horcajada
- Horcajo de las Torres
- El Hornillo
- Hoyocasero
- El Hoyo de Pinares
- Hoyorredondo
- Hoyos del Collado
- Hoyos del Espino
- Hoyos de Miguel Muñoz
- Hurtumpascual
- Junciana
- Langa
- Lanzahíta
- El Losar del Barco
- Los Llanos de Tormes
- Madrigal de las Altas Torres
- Maello
- Malpartida de Corneja
- Mamblas
- Mancera de Arriba
- Manjabálago y Ortigosa de Rioalmar
- Marlín
- Martiherrero
- Martínez
- Mediana de Voltoya
- Medinilla
- Mengamuñoz
- Mesegar de Corneja
- Mijares
- Mingorría
- El Mirón
- Mironcillo
- Mirueña de los Infanzones
- Mombeltrán
- Monsalupe
- Moraleja de Matacabras
- Muñana
- Muñico
- Muñogalindo
- Muñogrande
- Muñomer del Peco
- Muñopepe
- Muñosancho
- Muñotello
- Narrillos del Álamo
- Narrillos del Rebollar
- Narros del Castillo
- Narros del Puerto
- Narros de Saldueña
- Navacepedilla de Corneja
- Nava de Arévalo
- Nava del Barco
- Navadijos
- Navaescurial
- Navahondilla
- Navalacruz
- Navalmoral
- Navalonguilla
- Navalosa
- Navalperal de Pinares
- Navalperal de Tormes
- Navaluenga
- Navaquesera
- Navarredonda de Gredos
- Navarredondilla
- Navarrevisca
- Las Navas del Marqués
- Navatalgordo
- Navatejares
- Neila de San Miguel
- Niharra
- Ojos-Albos
- Orbita
- El Oso
- Padiernos
- Pajares de Adaja
- Palacios de Goda
- Papatrigo
- El Parral
- Pascualcobo
- Pedro Bernardo
- Pedro-Rodríguez
- Peguerinos
- Peñalba de Ávila
- Piedrahíta
- Piedralaves
- Poveda
- Poyales del Hoyo
- Pozanco
- Pradosegar
- Puerto Castilla
- Rasueros
- Riocabado
- Riofrío
- Rivilla de Barajas
- Salobral
- Salvadiós
- San Bartolomé de Béjar
- San Bartolomé de Corneja
- San Bartolomé de Pinares
- Sanchidrián
- Sanchorreja
- San Esteban de los Patos
- San Esteban del Valle
- San Esteban de Zapardiel
- San García de Ingelmos
- San Juan de la Encinilla
- San Juan de Gredos
- San Juan de la Nava
- San Juan del Molinillo
- San Juan del Olmo
- San Lorenzo de Tormes
- San Martín de la Vega del Alberche
- San Martín del Pimpollar
- San Miguel de Corneja
- San Miguel de Serrezuela
- San Pascual
- San Pedro del Arroyo
- Santa Cruz del Valle
- Santa Cruz de Pinares
- Santa María del Arroyo
- Santa María del Berrocal
- Santa María del Cubillo
- Santa María de los Caballeros
- Santa María del Tiétar
- Santiago del Collado
- Santiago del Tormes
- Santo Domingo de las Posadas
- Santo Tomé de Zabarcos
- San Vicente de Arévalo
- La Serrada
- Serranillos
- Sigeres
- Sinlabajos
- Solana de Ávila
- Solana de Rioalmar
- Solosancho
- Sotalbo
- Sotillo de la Adrada
- El Tiemblo
- Tiñosillos
- Tolbaños
- Tormellas
- Tornadizos de Ávila
- La Torre
- Tórtoles
- Umbrías
- Vadillo de la Sierra
- Valdecasa
- Vega de Santa María
- Velayos
- Villaflor
- Villafranca de la Sierra
- Villanueva de Ávila
- Villanueva de Gómez
- Villanueva del Aceral
- Villanueva del Campillo
- Villar de Corneja
- Villarejo del Valle
- Villatoro
- Viñegra de Moraña
- Vita
- Zapardiel de la Cañada

== Demographics ==
As of 2025, the population is 160,738, of which 50.3% are male, and 49.7% are female. Minors make up 14.2% of the population, and seniors make up 27.2%.

Historical population

Year	Pop.	±%
1528	105,270	—
1591	143,165	+36.0%
1752	102,707	−28.3%
1787	118,318	+15.2%
1842	114,613	−3.1%
1857	164,039	+43.1%
1877	181,779	+10.8%
1887	195,321	+7.4%
1900	206,534	+5.7%
1910	219,126	+6.1%
1920	225,384	+2.9%

Year	Pop.	±%
1930	236,067	+4.7%
1940	246,851	+4.6%
1950	259,534	+5.1%
1960	252,798	−2.6%
1970	211,556	−16.3%
1981	183,586	−13.2%
1991	174,378	−5.0%
2001	163,442	−6.3%
2011	171,647	+5.0%
2021	158,898	−7.4%

Source: Llopis Agellán & Cuervo Fuente 2004, p. 52, INE

=== Immigration ===
As of 2025, immigrants make up 12.7% of the population. The 5 largest foreign countries of birth are Morocco, Colombia, Peru, Romania, and Venezuela.
