= Becedillas =

- municipality
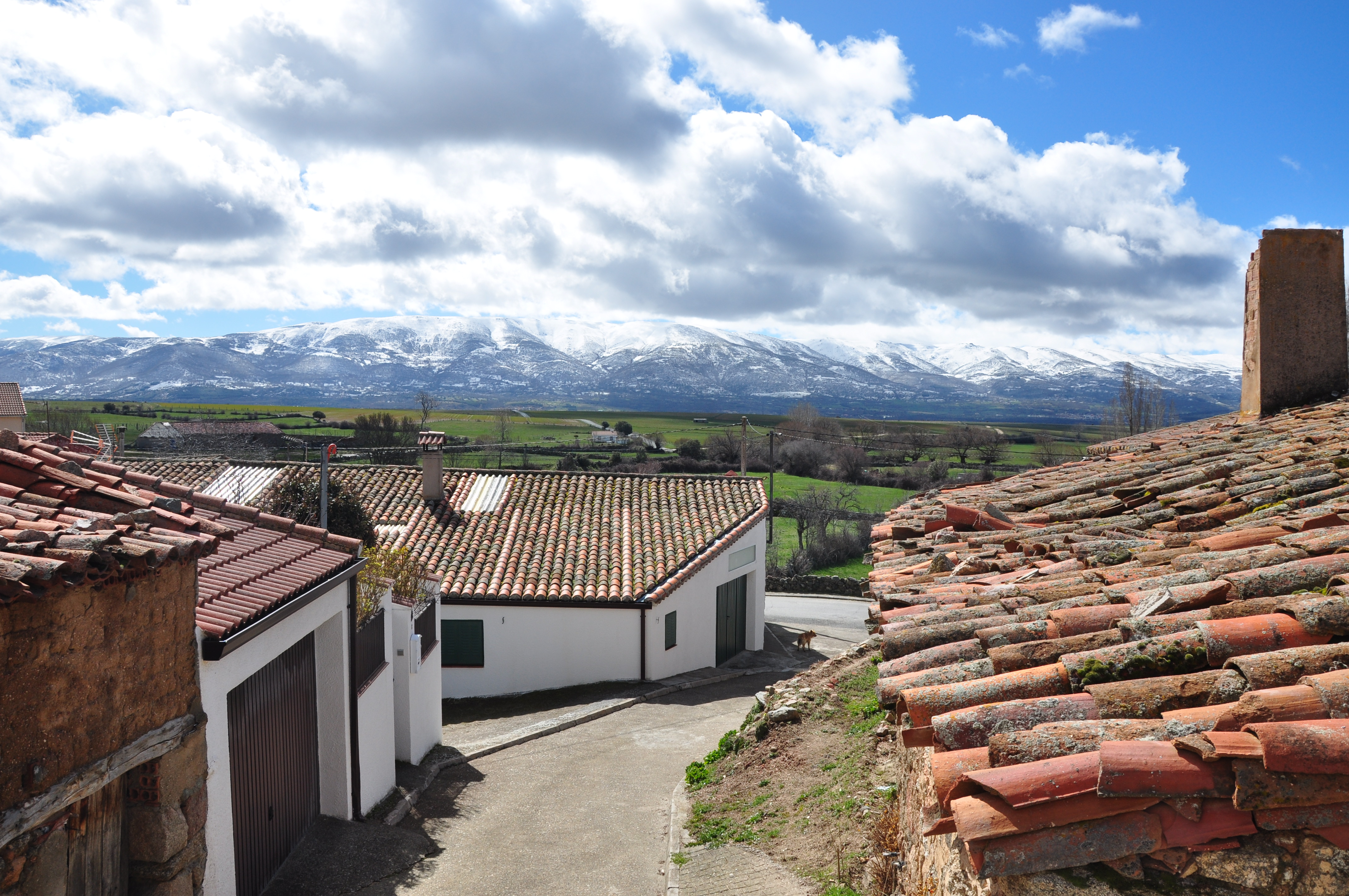
- Becedillas and Sierra de Piedrahíta

- Flag Coat of arms

- Extension of the municipal term within the province of Ávila

- Location in Spain. Becedillas (Spain)
- Coordinates: 40°32′17″N 5°19′33″W
- Country: Spain
- Autonomous community: Castile and León
- Province: Ávila
- Municipality: Becedillas

Area
  - Total: 19 km^{2} (7.3 sq mi)

Population (2025-01-01)
  - Total: 70
  - Density: 3.7/km^{2} (9.5/sq mi)
- Time zone: UTC+1 (CET)
  - Summer (DST): UTC+2 (CEST)
- Website: Official website

Becedillas is a municipality located in the province of Ávila, Castile and León, Spain. According to the 2025 census (INE), the municipality had a population of 70 inhabitants.

== Population ==
Historical population
| Year | Pop. | ±% p.a. |
|---|---|---|
| 2023 | 70 | — |
| 2024 | 69 | −1.43% |
| 2025 | 70 | +1.45% |
Source: INE
