= Casas del Puerto =

- municipality
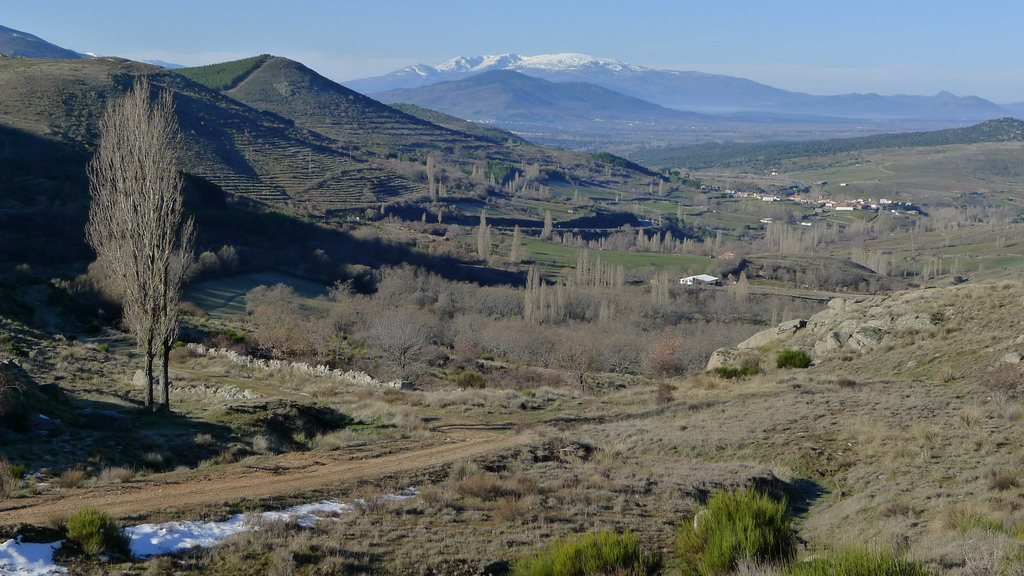
- Casas del Puerto and Corneja Valley

- Location in Spain. Casas del Puerto (Spain)
- Coordinates: 40°31′39″N 5°11′39″W
- Country: Spain
- Autonomous community: Castile and León
- Province: Ávila
- Municipality: Casas del Puerto

Area
  - Total: 22.14 km^{2} (8.55 sq mi)
- Elevation: 1,178 m (3,865 ft)

Population (2025-01-01)
  - Total: 80
  - Density: 3.6/km^{2} (9.4/sq mi)
- Time zone: UTC+1 (CET)
  - Summer (DST): UTC+2 (CEST)
- Website: Official website

Casas del Puerto is a municipality located in the province of Ávila, Castile and León, Spain. According to the 2025 census (INE), the municipality had a population of 80 inhabitants.

== Population ==
Historical population
| Year | Pop. | ±% p.a. |
|---|---|---|
| 2023 | 85 | — |
| 2024 | 83 | −2.35% |
| 2025 | 80 | −3.61% |
Source: INE
