= Hurtumpascual =

- municipality
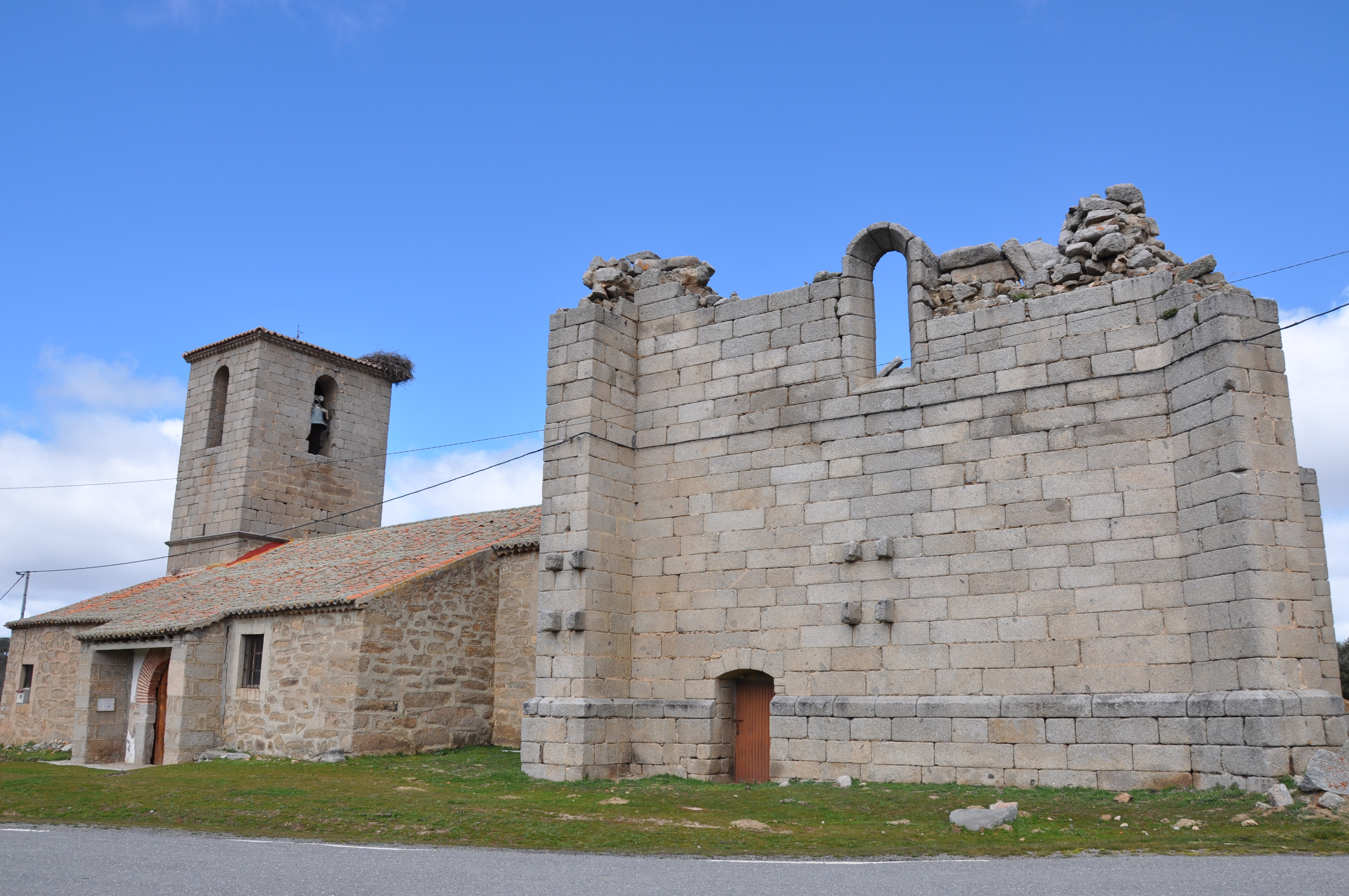
- Parish Church of the Assumption of Our Lady, Hurtumpascual
- Flag Coat of arms
- Location in Spain. Hurtumpascual (Castile and León)
- Coordinates: 40°41′32″N 5°06′45″W
- Country: Spain
- Autonomous community: Castile and León
- Province: Ávila
- Municipality: Hurtumpascual

Area
  - Total: 18 km^{2} (6.9 sq mi)

Population (2025-01-01)
  - Total: 41
  - Density: 2.3/km^{2} (5.9/sq mi)
- Time zone: UTC+1 (CET)
  - Summer (DST): UTC+2 (CEST)
- Website: Official website

Hurtumpascual is a municipality located in the province of Ávila, Castile and León, Spain.

== Population ==
Historical population
Year	Pop.	±% p.a.
2023	43	—
2024	42	−2.33%
2025	41	−2.38%
Source: INE
