= Maello =

- municipality
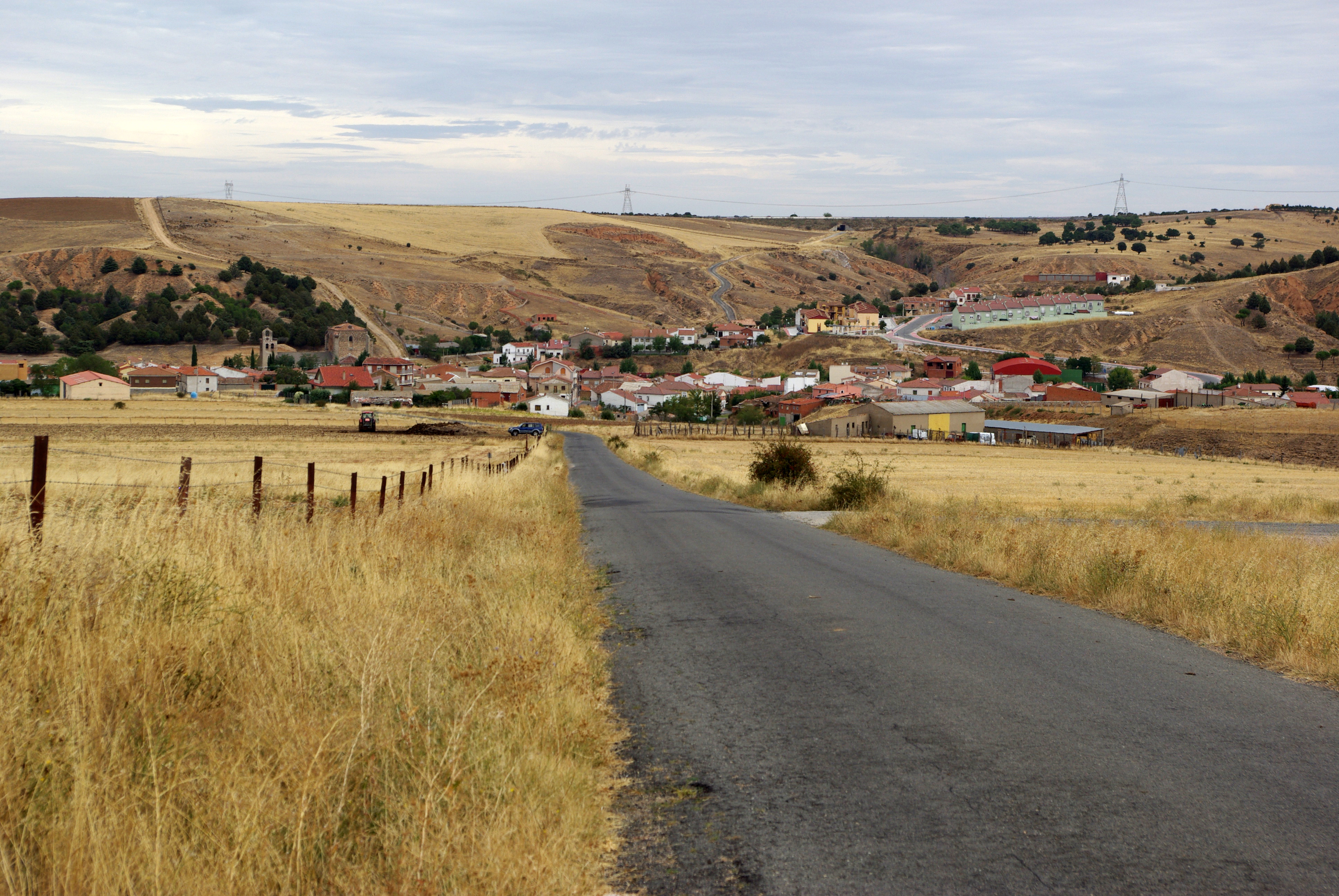
- View of Maello.

- Flag Coat of arms

- Location in Spain. Maello (Spain)
- Coordinates: 40°48′40″N 4°30′32″W
- Country: Spain
- Autonomous community: Castile and León
- Province: Ávila

Area
  - Total: 65 km^{2} (25 sq mi)

Population (2025-01-01)
  - Total: 713
  - Density: 11/km^{2} (28/sq mi)
- Time zone: UTC+1 (CET)
  - Summer (DST): UTC+2 (CEST)
- Website: Official website

Maello is a municipality located in the province of Ávila, Castile and León, Spain.

== Population ==
Historical population
Year	Pop.	±% p.a.
2023	705	—
2024	700	−0.71%
2025	713	+1.86%
Source: INE
