= Niharra =

- municipality
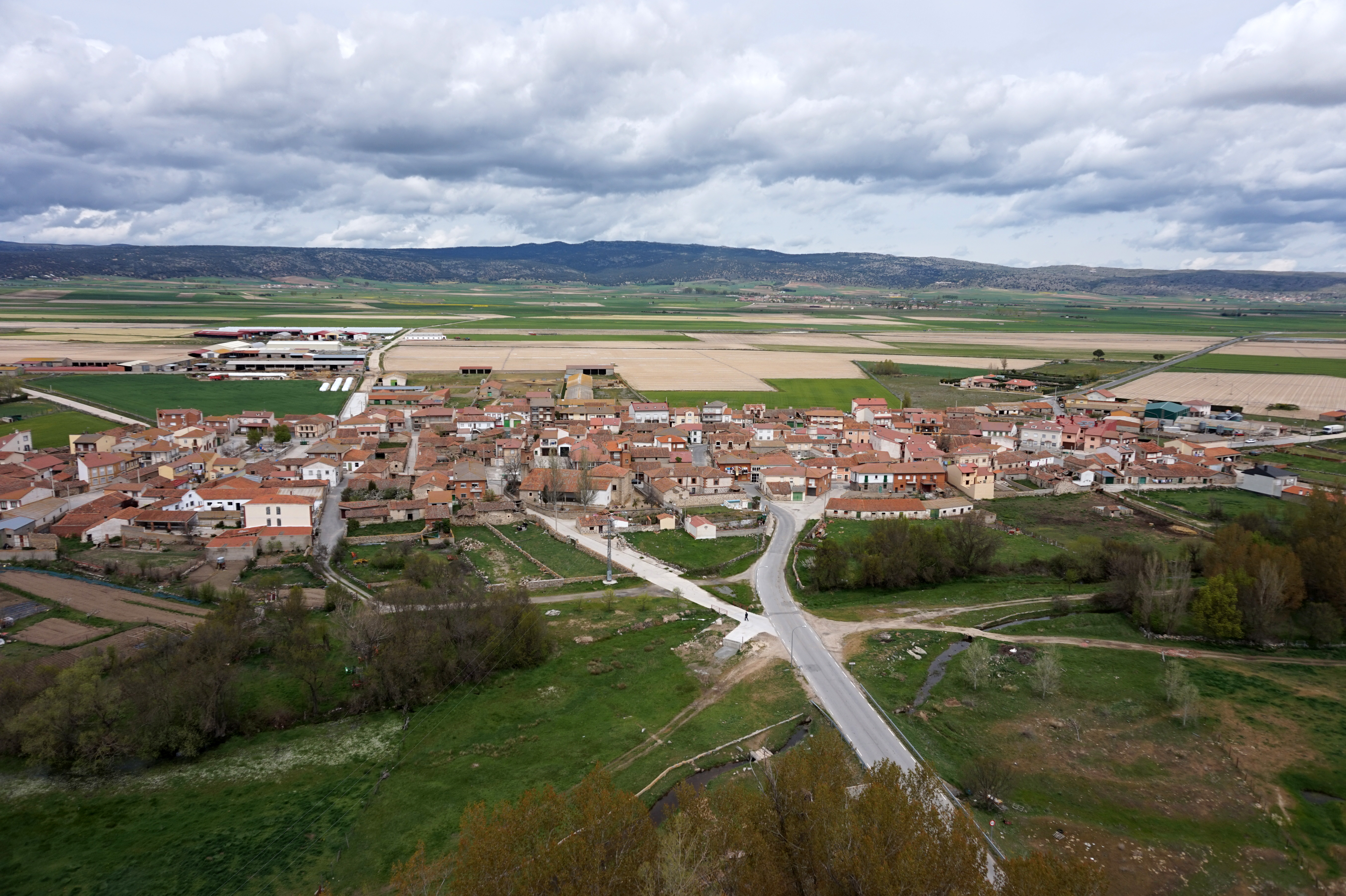
- Aerial view of Niharra

- Flag Coat of arms

- Location in Spain. Niharra (Spain)
- Coordinates: 40°35′22″N 4°50′23″W
- Country: Spain
- Autonomous community: Castile and León
- Province: Ávila

Area
  - Total: 11 km^{2} (4.2 sq mi)

Population (2025-01-01)
  - Total: 167
  - Density: 15/km^{2} (39/sq mi)
- Time zone: UTC+1 (CET)
  - Summer (DST): UTC+2 (CEST)
- Website: Official website

Niharra is a municipality located in the province of Ávila, Castile and León, Spain.

== Population ==
Historical population
Year	Pop.	±% p.a.
2023	177	—
2024	183	+3.39%
2025	167	−8.74%
Source: INE
