= Verraco =

Granite megalithic sculpture of animal, found in Spain and Portugal

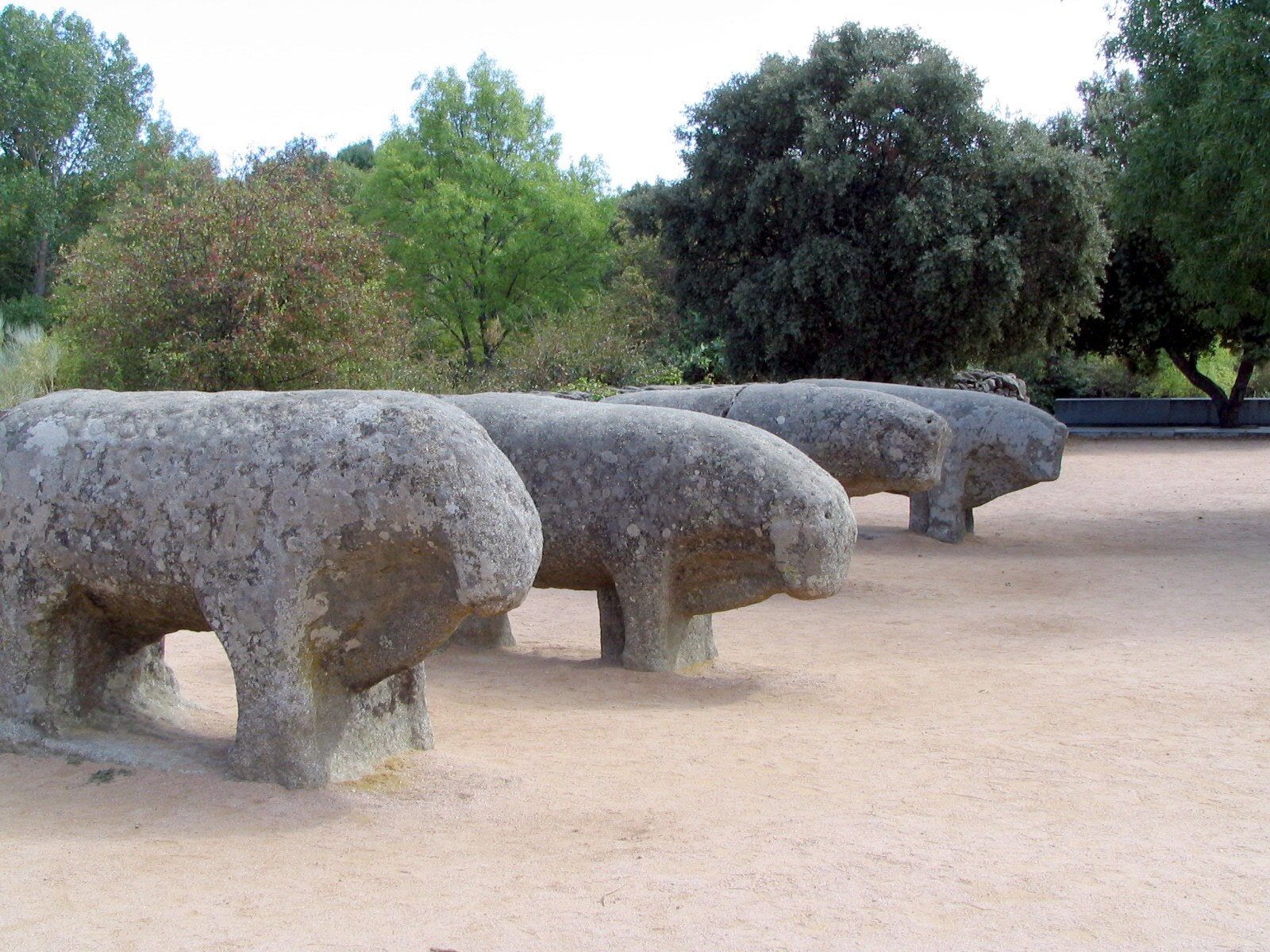
The Bulls of Guisando, in El Tiemblo, Castile and León, Spain.

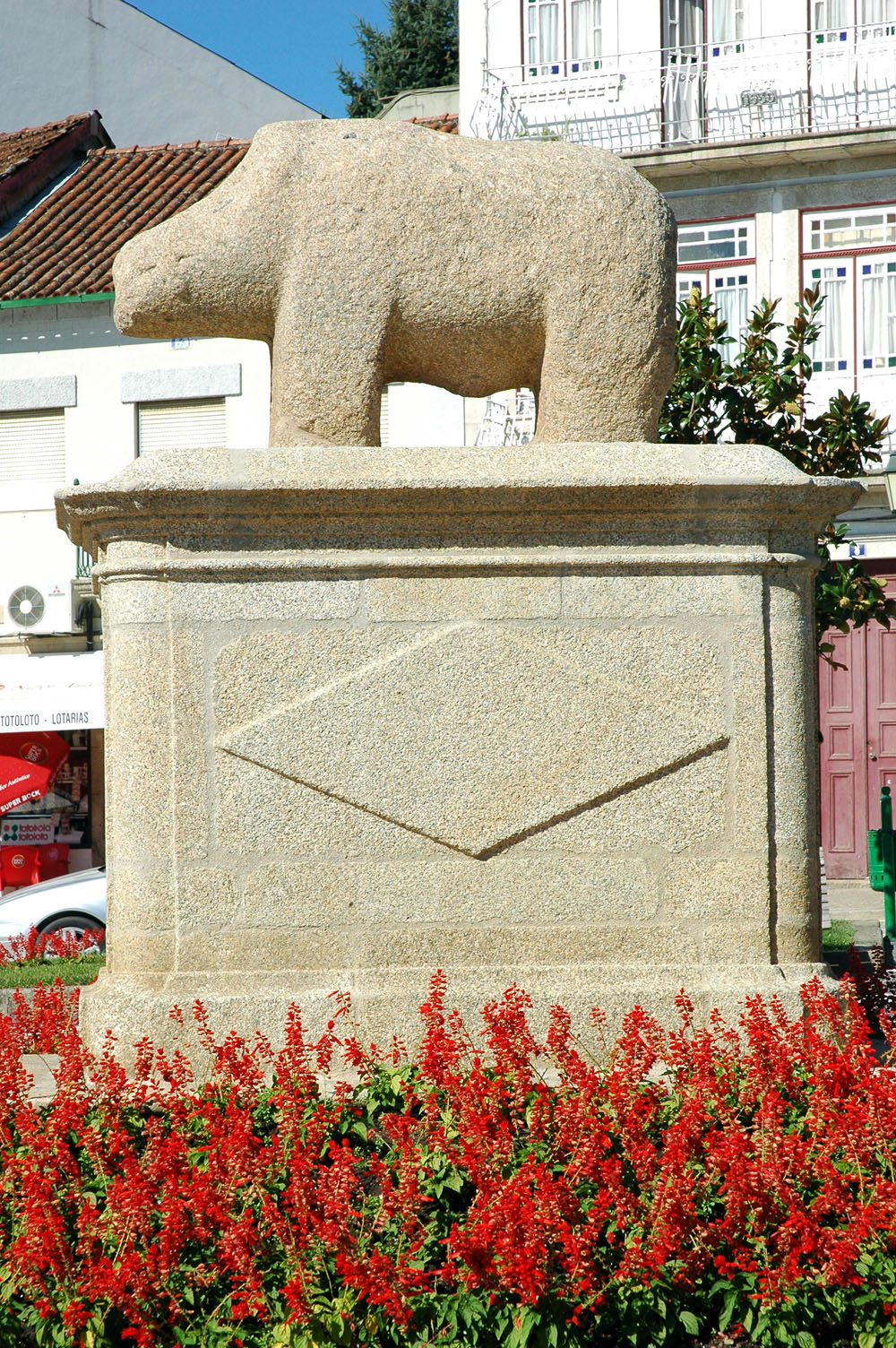
The Sow of Murça, in Murça, Portugal.

Verracos (Spanish: verraco; Portuguese: berrão; literally 'boar') are granite megalithic sculptures of animals, created by the Vettones in the west of the meseta – the high central plain of the Iberian Peninsula – in the Spanish provinces of Ávila, Salamanca, Segovia, Zamora, Cáceres, Ourense and the Portuguese provinces of Beira Baixa, Beiras e Serra da Estrela, Douro and Terras de Trás-os-Montes. Over 400 verracos have been identified.

== Characteristics ==
The Spanish word verraco normally refers to boars, and the sculptures are sometimes called verracos de piedra (pigs of stone) to distinguish them from live animals. The stone verracos often represent boars and pigs, which were held as sacred animals by Celtic peoples. However, they appear to represent not only pigs but also other animals. Some have been identified as bulls, and the village of El Oso, Ávila, named for "the Bear", has a verraco which supposedly represents a bear. Their dates range from the mid-fourth to first centuries BC. There are some similar zoomorphic monument markers in lands of Poland from the same period or older.

Though they were perhaps not confined to a single usage, the verracos were an essential part of the landscape of the Vettones, one of the Pre-Roman peoples of the Iberian Peninsula. It has generally been assumed, from their high visibility in their original open-field surroundings, that these sculptures had some protective religious significance, whether guarding the security of livestock or as funerary monuments (some of them bear Latin funerary inscriptions). The verracos are particularly numerous too in the vicinity of the walled Celtiberian communities that Romans had called oppida.

== Notable verracos ==
=== Portugal ===
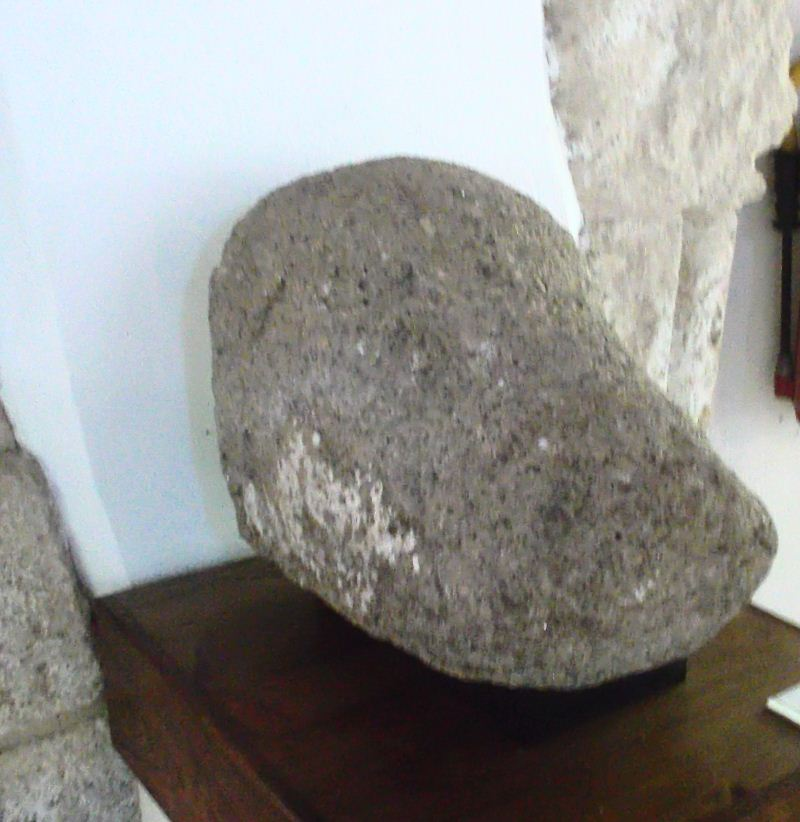
Berrão head displayed in the Marvão Municipal Museum

- Murça
  - Porca de Murça (literally the "Sow of Murça" in Portuguese, although the sculpture appears to represent a boar, i.e. a male rather than a female pig). The name has been taken to designate a red wine of the Douro district.
- Torre de Dona Chama
  - Berroa
- Marvão
  - Head of berrão, with right eye clearly visible, found in the Abegoa area of Marvão. Today in Municipal Museum in Marvão.

=== Spain ===
==== Castile and León ====
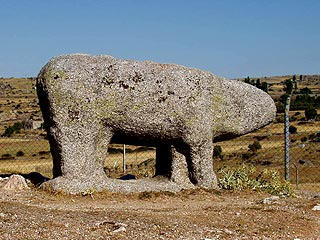
Verraco in Mingorría, Castile and León, Spain.

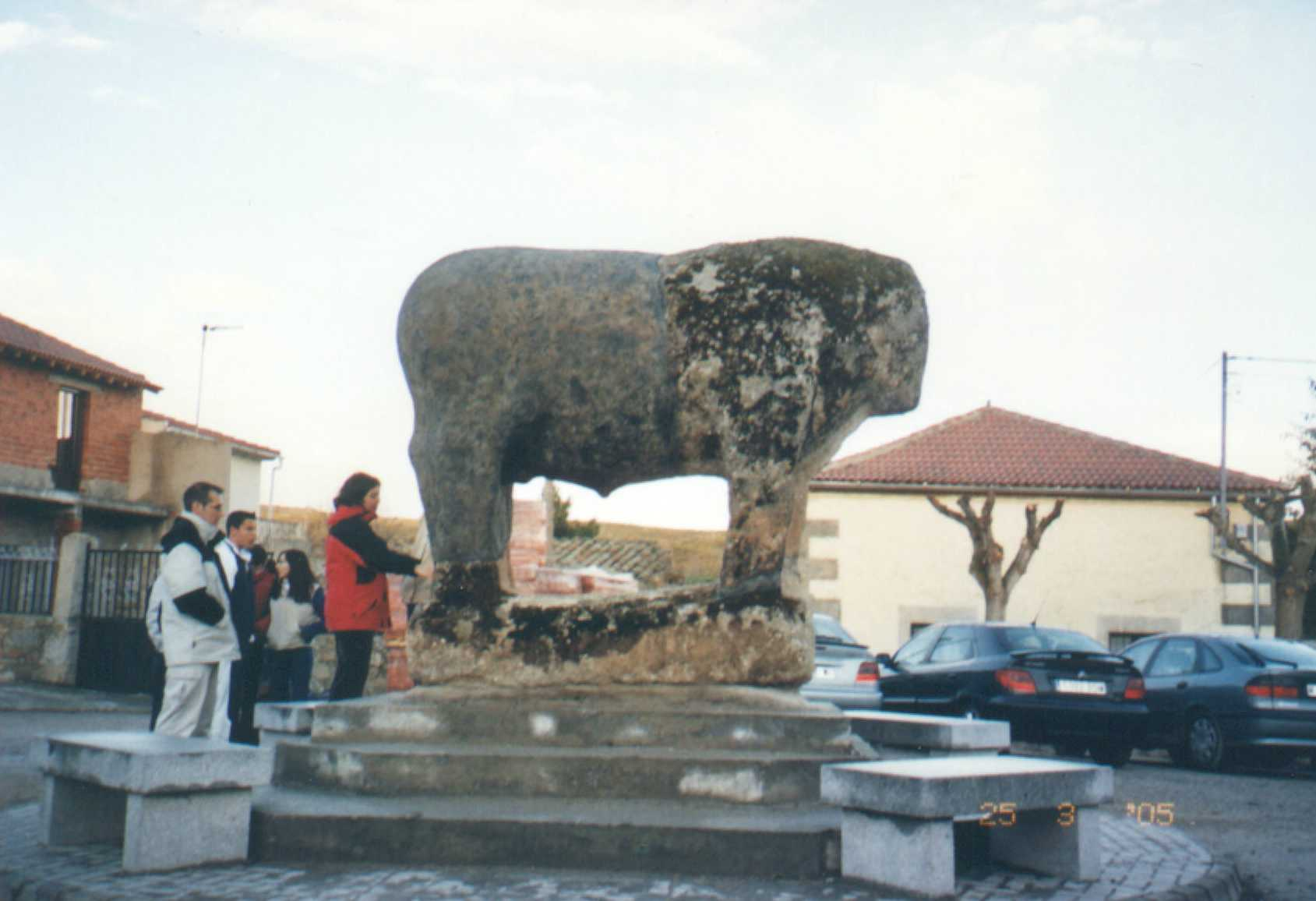
Verraco in the Plaza mayor of Villanueva del Campillo. It is the Vettones' largest zoomorphic sculpture so far discovered in the Iberian Peninsula.

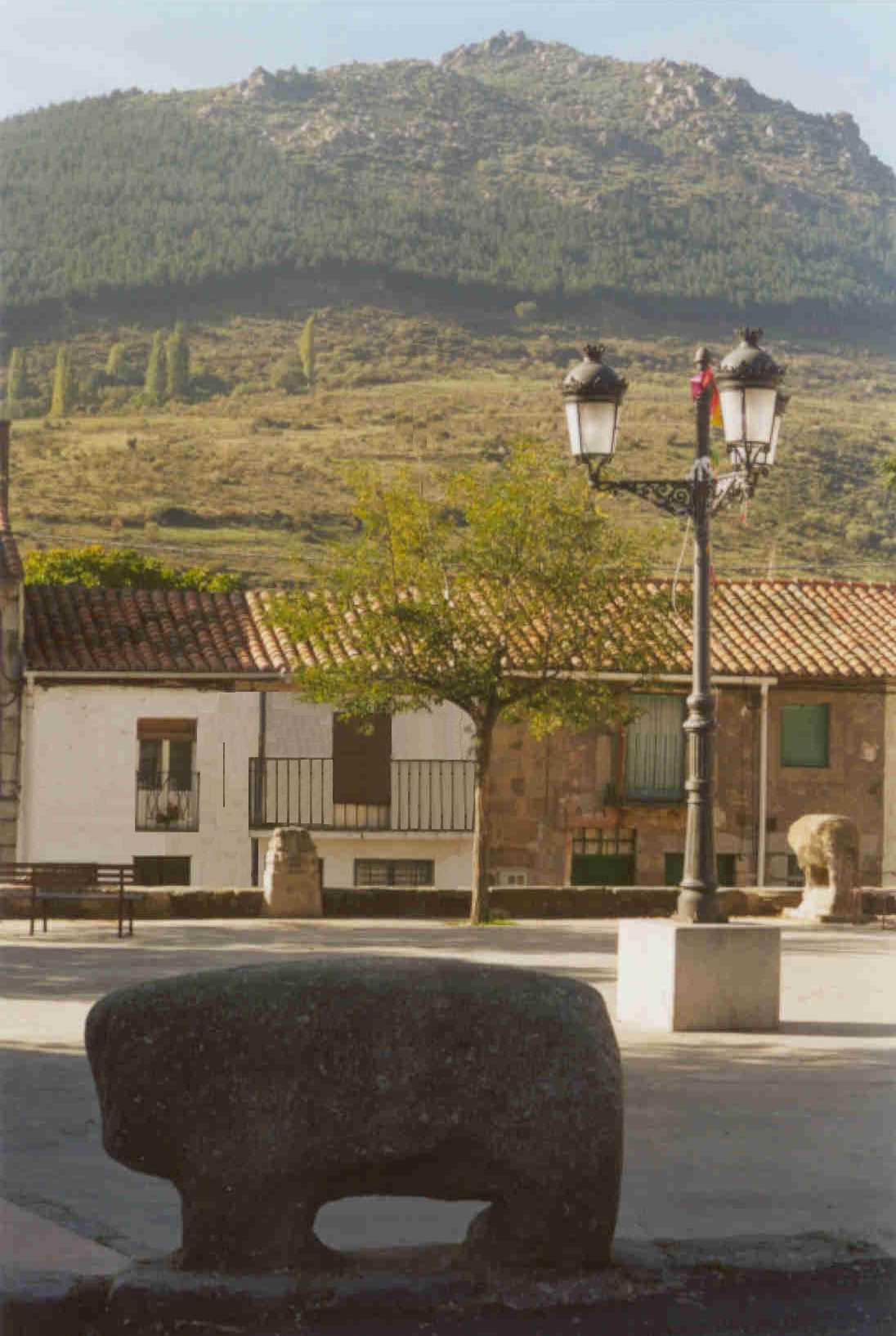
Verracos in Villatoro, Castile and León, Spain.

===== Province of Ávila =====
- Aldea del Rey Niño
- Arévalo (one verraco in the Palacio del general Vicente de Río)
- Ávila (14 verracos from Tornadizos and three found next to Adaja River)
- Cardeñosa (Castro of Las Cogotas)
- Chamartín (five verracos; the best preserved is the Verraco of the Castro de la Mesa de Miranda)
- Martiherrero (four verracos)
- Mingorría (one verraco near hermitage of the Virgin, but another one inlaid in the walls of the building itself)
- Mirueña de los Infanzones (two verracos embedded in a wall of a house)
- Narrillos de San Leonardo, Ávila
- El Oso (verraco nicknamed "El oso" (the bear) and gives name to the town)
- San Miguel de Serrezuela (today in El Torreón de los Guzmanes in the city of Ávila)
- Santa María del Arroyo (Verraco of Santa María del Arroyo)
- Santo Domingo de las Posadas (one verraco)
- Solosancho (two verracos, Castro de Ulaca)
- El Tiemblo (four verracos, known as the "Bulls of Guisando")
- Tornadizos de Ávila (eight verracos preserved)
- La Torre (two headless verracos in the atrium of the church and other embedded in a wall)
- Villanueva del Campillo (two verracos, one of them the largest in Europe)
- Villatoro (three verracos)
- Vicolozano, Ávila

===== Province of Salamanca =====
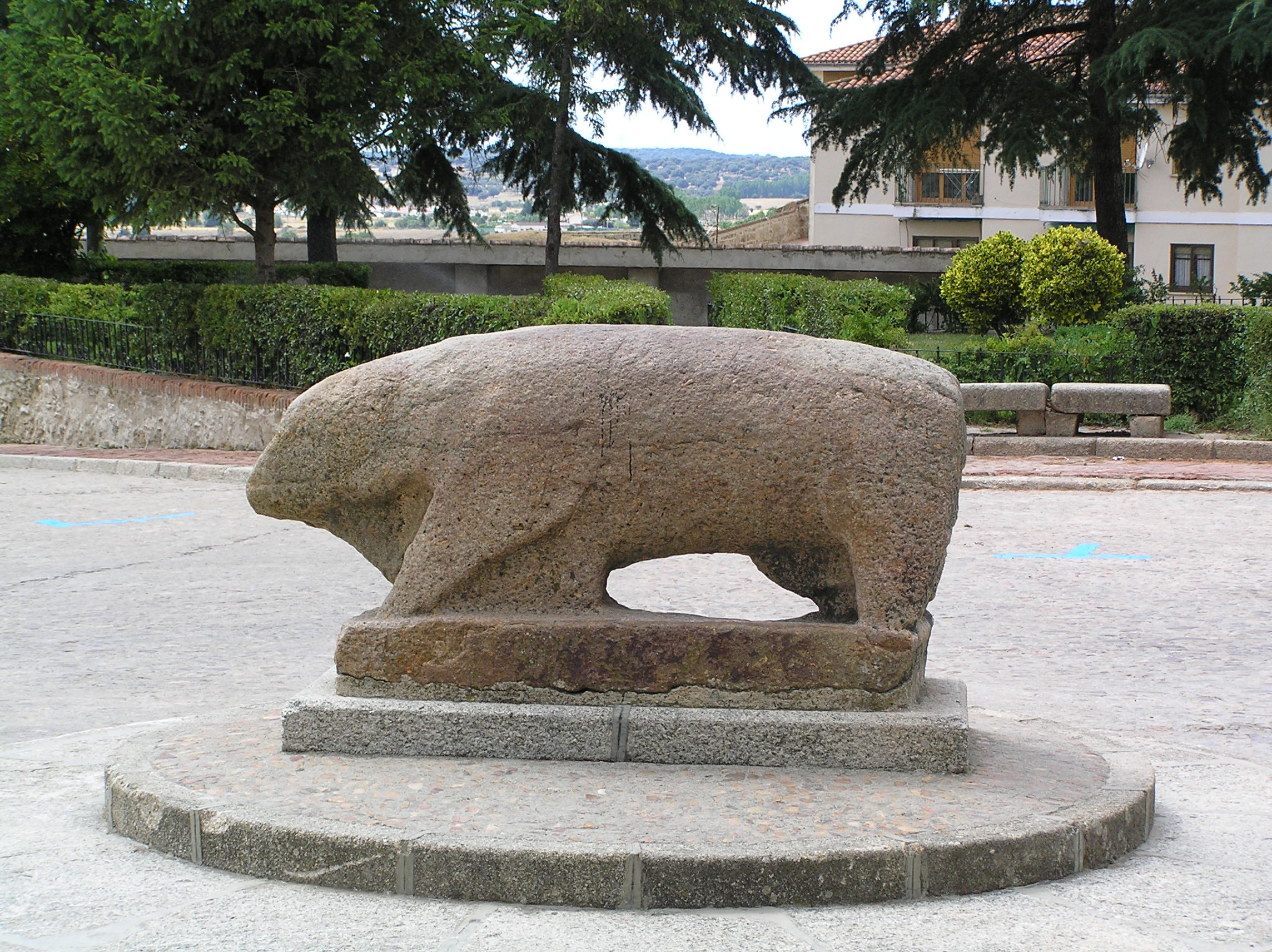
Verraco in Ciudad Rodrigo, Castile and León, Spain.

- Ciudad Rodrigo (two verracos, one of them from Gallegos de Argañán)
- Gallegos de Argañán (one today in the Museum of Salamanca and other in the Casa de la Cultura in Ciudad Rodrigo)
- Juzbado
- Larrodrigo
- Ledesma
- Lumbrales (two verracos)
- Masueco (today in the Museum of Salamanca)
- Monleón
- Puente del Congosto
- La Redonda (today in the Museum of Salamanca)
- Salamanca (the verraco of the bridge cited in El Lazarillo de Tormes next to the Roman bridge and several verracos in the Museum)
- San Felices de los Gallegos
- Santibáñez de Béjar
- Tabera de Abajo
- Yecla de Yeltes (Castro de Yecla la Vieja, today in the Aula arqueológica)

===== Province of Segovia =====
- Segovia (two verracos: a bull and a wild boar; today in the Museo Provincial)
- Coca (three verracos: two in front the City Gate of the Town and one embedded in the castle's walls)

===== Province of Zamora =====
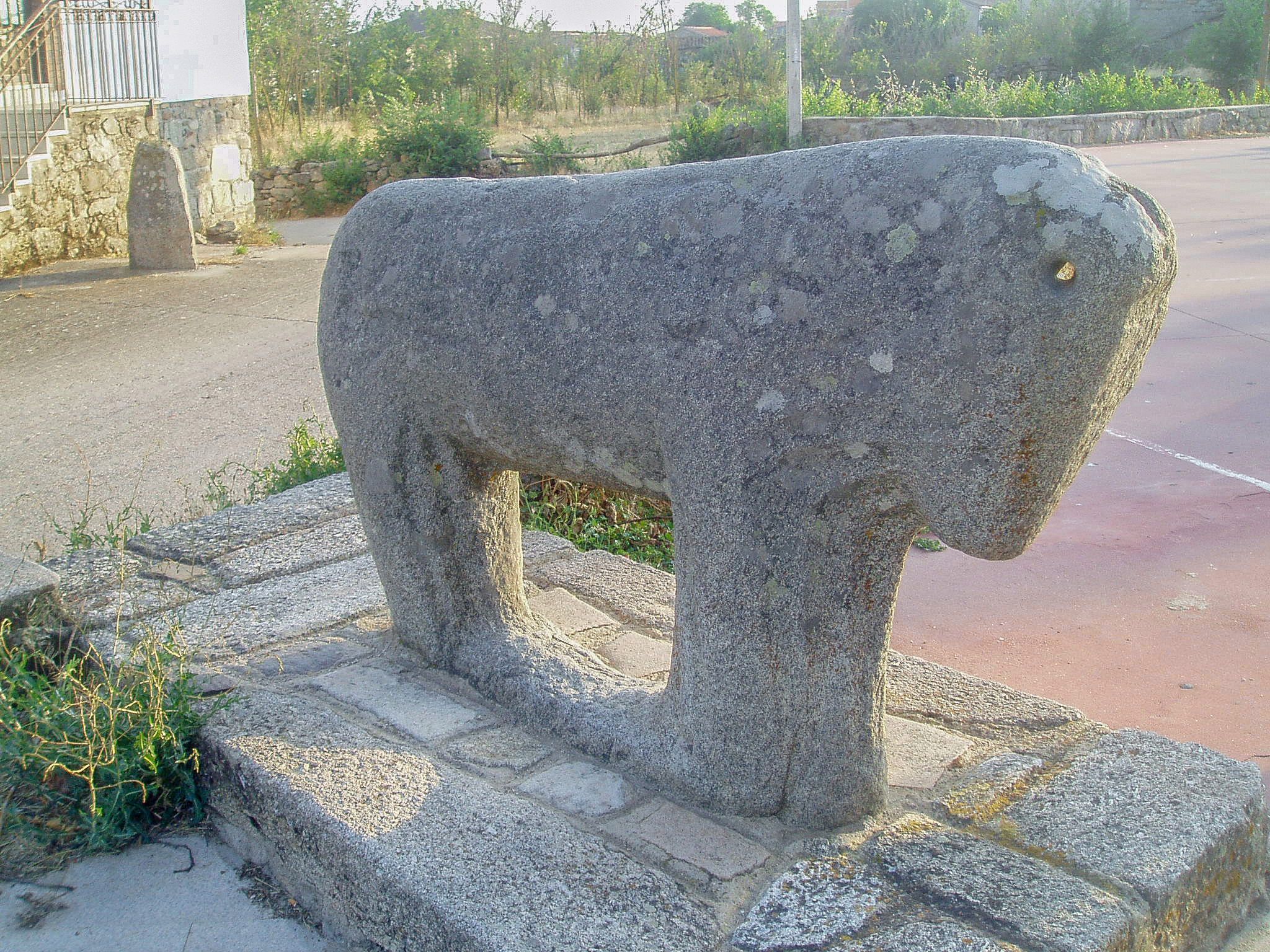
Mule of Villardiegua de la Ribera, Castile and León, Spain.

- Muelas del Pan
- San Vitero
- Toro
- Villardiegua de la Ribera

==== Castile-La Mancha ====
===== Province of Toledo =====
- La Puebla de Montalbán (one verraco, found in 2006 and placed in the Museum "La Celestina")
- Castillo de Bayuela (two verracos, in the Plaza de San Antonio and in almost perfect condition)
- Talavera de la Reina (known as «cabeza del moro» ("the Moor's head") because it is embedded in a wall, with only the head being visible)
- Talavera la Nueva
- Torralba de Oropesa
- Torrecilla de la Jara (two verracos)

==== Extremadura ====
===== Province of Cáceres =====
- Botija (Castro de Villasviejas del Tamuja, "Tamusia")
- Guadalupe (Caserío de Mirabel)
- Jaraíz de la Vera
- Madrigalejo (currently in the Archaeological Museum of Cáceres)
- Segura de Toro
- Valdelacasa de Tajo
- Villar del Pedroso
- Pasarón de la Vera (possibly destroyed in the 19th century, but still forming part of its coat of arms)
