= Las Cogotas =

Archaeological site in Cardeñosa, Spain

Coordinates: 40.7275°N 4.7011°W

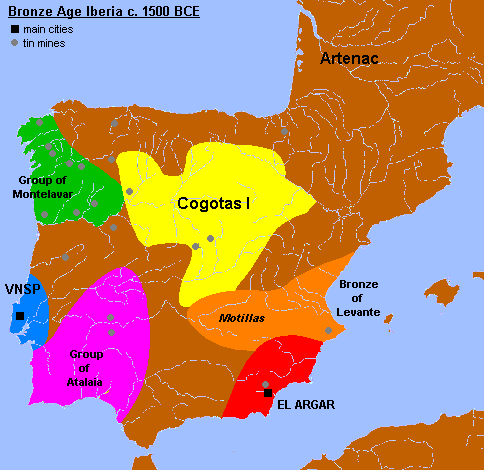
- Geographical range: Spain
- Period: Bronze Age, Iron Age
- Dates: 1800-1150 BC
- Preceded by: Bell Beaker culture, El Argar
- Followed by: Vettones, Roman Republic

Las Cogotas (Spanish: Las Cogotas) is an archaeological site in Spain in Cardenosa municipality, province of Avila. The site was researched by the Galician archaeologist Juan Cabré in 1920s. It is namesake for two different archaeological cultures known from this site: Cogotas I (pre-Celtic) of the Late Bronze Age and Cogotas II (most probably Celtic) of the Iron Age. The latter is known from the upper layer of Las Cogotas, which represents a classical settlement of Vettones, which inhabited the territory of modern provinces of Avila and Salamanca, as well as parts of Toledo, Zamora, Cáceres and Tras-os-Montes in Portugal.

== Protocogotas culture ==
This stage of the Meseta history is the least known, although a series of archeological sites, such as Los Tolmos de Caracena in Soria, Cogeces del Monte in Valladolid, Abia de la Obispalia in Cuenca, and some others, allow to describe Protocogotas culture as a formation stage of Cogotas I culture. This culture, which existed around 1700—1550 BC, is also known as Cogeces horizon, and is based on the Bell Beaker substrate influenced by either El Argar or Atlantic Bronze. Although Protocogotas culture was not represented by finds in La Cogotas, it did have characteristic traits later displayed in Cogotas I.

== Cogotas I ==
Characteristic of this culture is black ceramics with various techniques: incised geometric motifs, incised-printed geometric motifs, - also called "dot and line" or zipper (es:Cerámica de Boquique), and excise geometric motifs with or without inlays of white or red paste. Vessels were relatively small, flat-based, conic, rough, supposedly used as kitchen ware. The culture extended roughly over the Spanish Duero basin, the upper half of the Ebro river, and the Spanish Tajo basin. Chronology of Cogotas I:

- Formation stage, 1700 BC (Protocogotas)
- incised and Boquique ceramics, 1550 BC.
- trade networks, 1350 BC.
- expansion of the culture, 1100 BC.
- disappearance, 1000 BC.

== Cogotas II ==
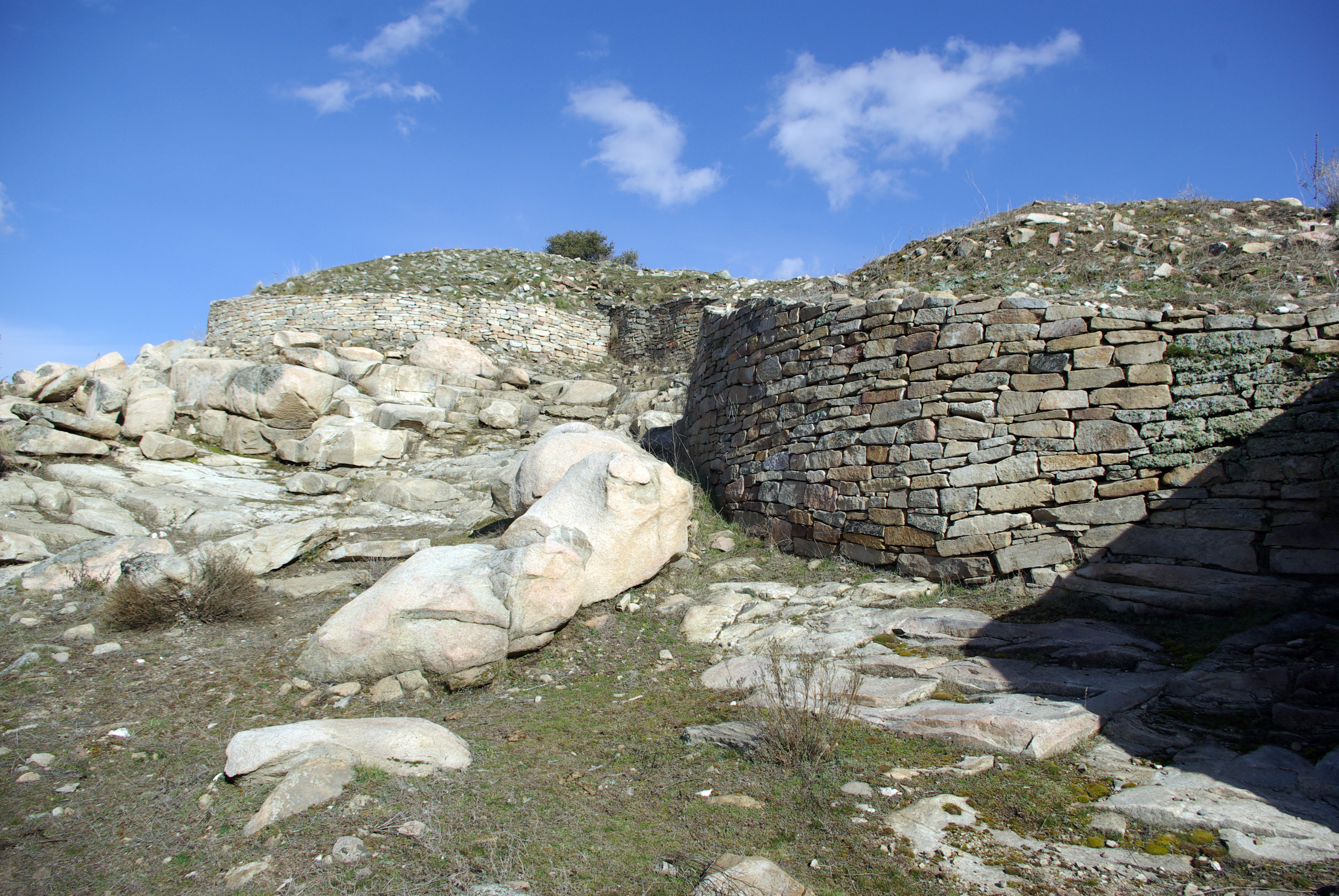
Castro of Las Cogotas, remains of stone walls

In the early 1st millennium BC the Iberic peninsula was invaded by the Celts and other Indo-European tribes, which occupied the central and western parts of the peninsula and created new cultures on the ruins of the older ones. One of them were Vettones, most probably of Celtic origin. Characteristic for Cogotas II cultures are verraco statues. These are stone bovine statues situated on pasture lands, whose exact usage is still unclear.

Among other material culture objects there were daggers, flat axes, copper alloy axes, sickles, granite grindstones, spindle whorls etc. Like other similar settlements, Cogotas of that time was divided into several functional districts, including several cattle enclosures and a necropolis. Cattle husbandry played an important role in the life of Vettones, which was probably reflected in their zoomorphic verraco statues.

== Genetic profile ==
Three individuals linked with Cogotas I remains were tested: an individual from Cueva de los Lagos (Aguilar del Río Alhama, La Rioja province) had the derived Y-chromosome haplogroup R1b-DF27; an individual from the Tordillos site (Aldeaseca de la Frontera, Salamanca province) had Y-DNA haplogroup R1b-M269, were the individual found at La Requejada site (San Román de Hornija, Valladolid province) had the clade R1b-P312. Other individuals found in the area and time of Cogotas I Culture were: a male from the Valdescusa site (Hervías, La Rioja province), whom had also R1b-M269, where two males of the same site had the derived clade R1b-L151, and another the subclade R1b-Z225. Two males found at Humanejos site (Parla, Madrid province) and Virgazal (Tablada de Rudrón, Burgos province), shared the R1b-P312 haplotype.

== Gallery ==
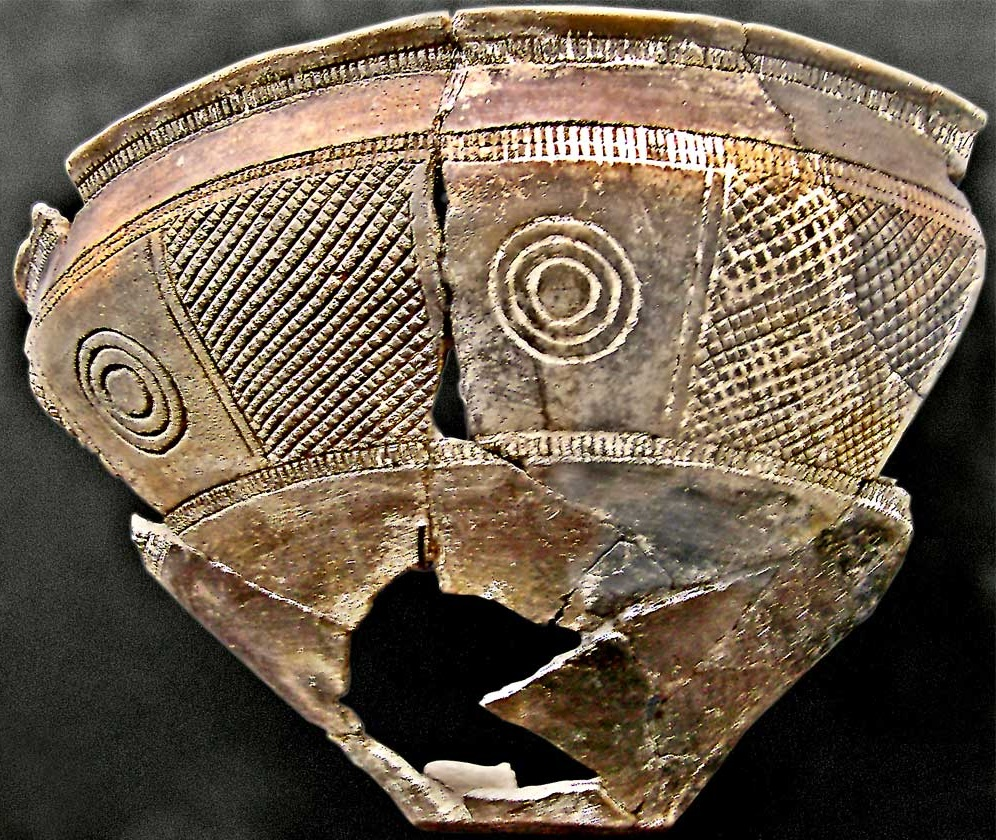
Cogotas I. Ceramics with incrustation

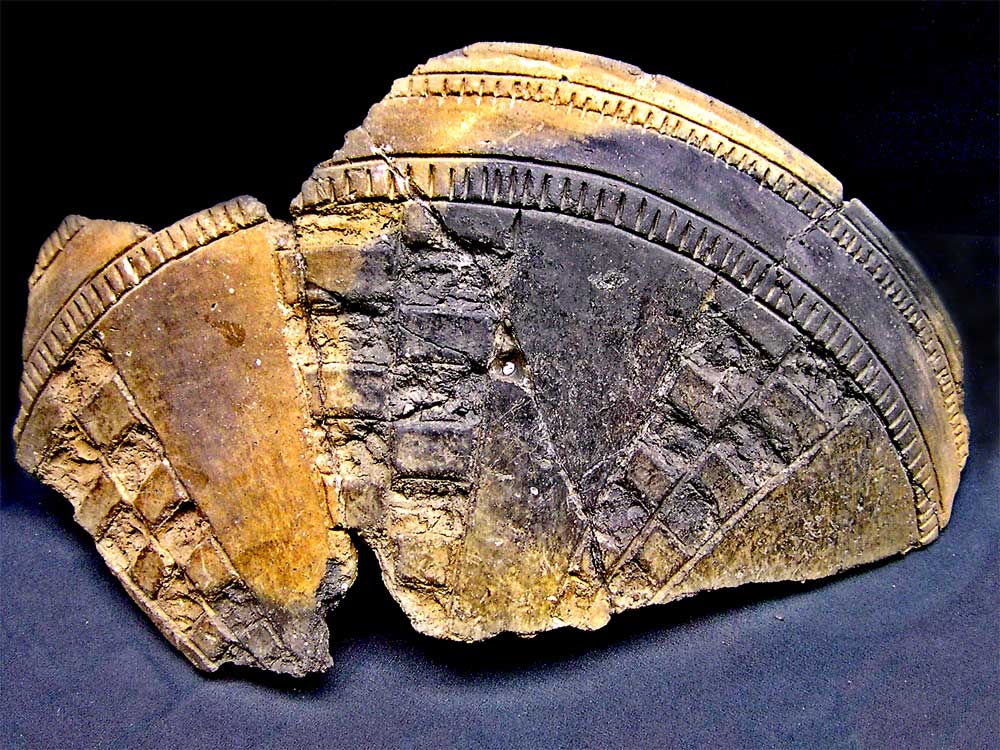
Cogotas I. Incised ceramics

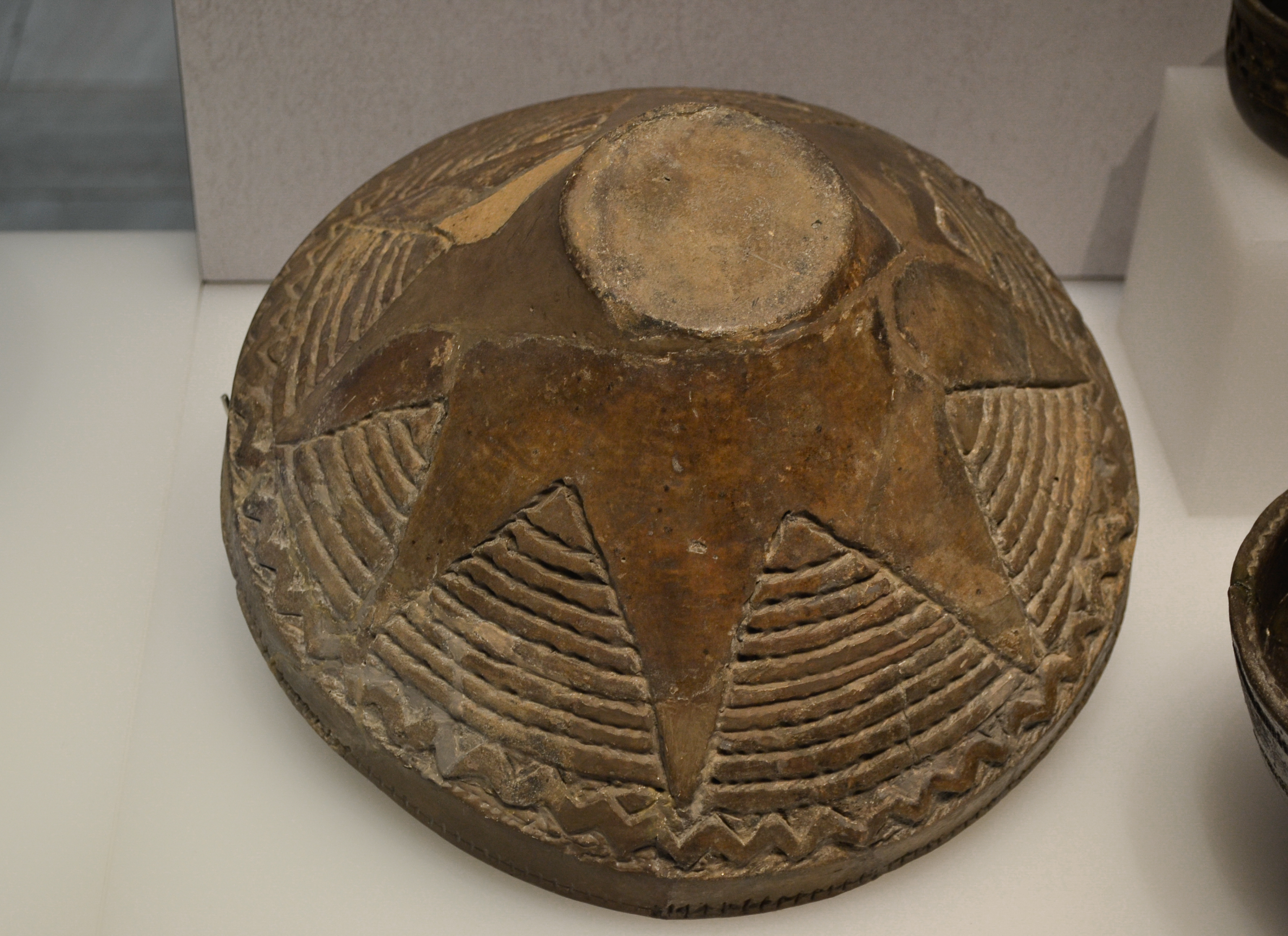
Cogotas I. Ceramics

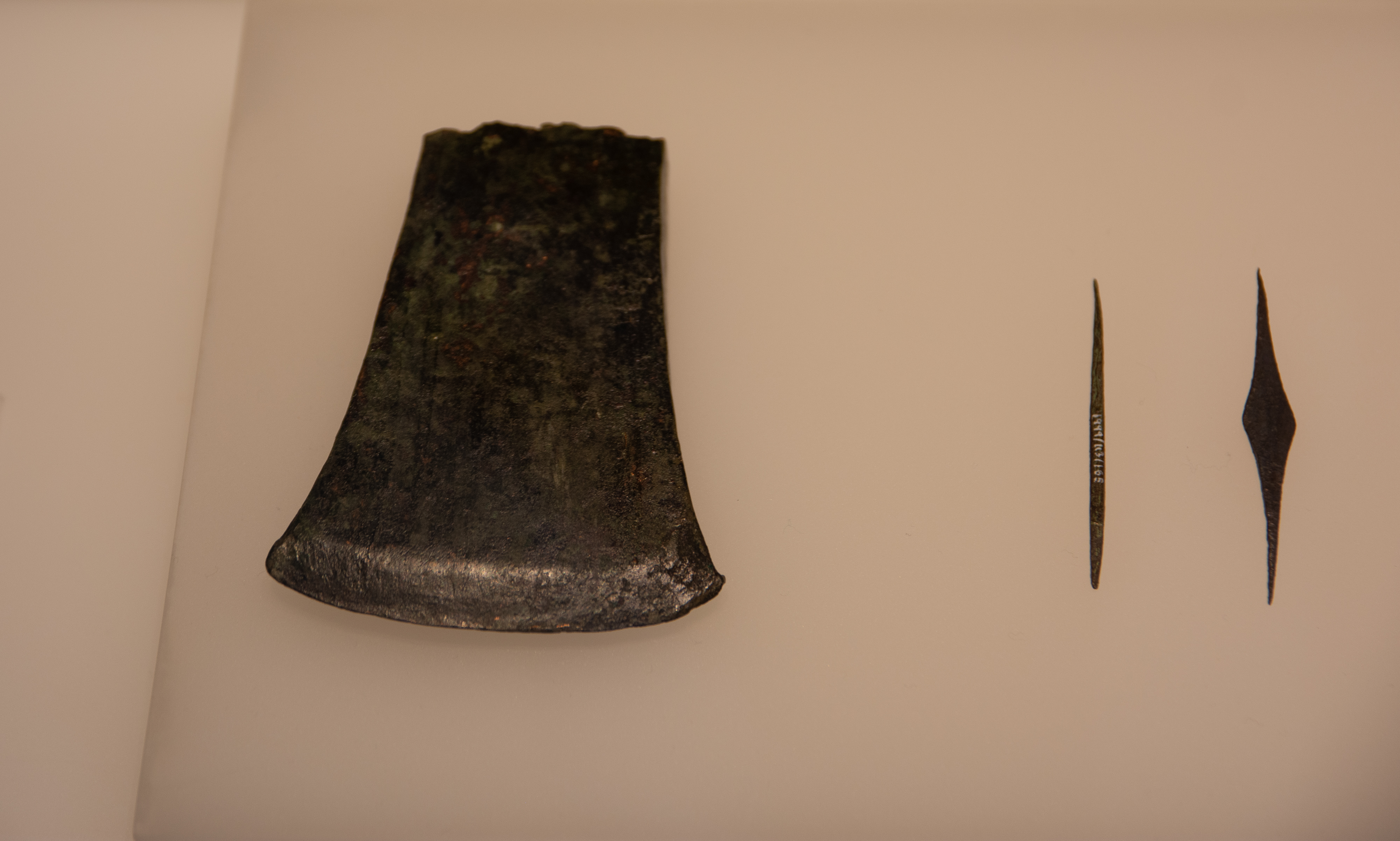
Cogotas I. Bronze artefacts

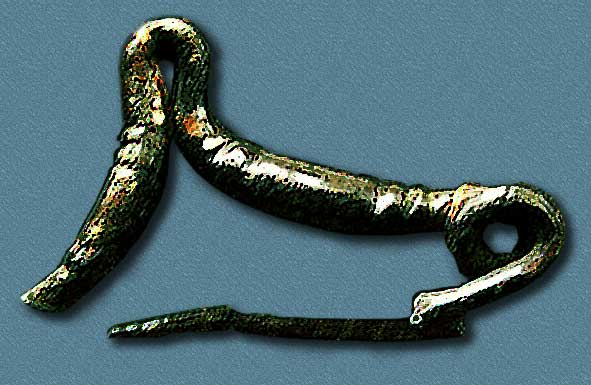
Cogotas I. A bent fibula

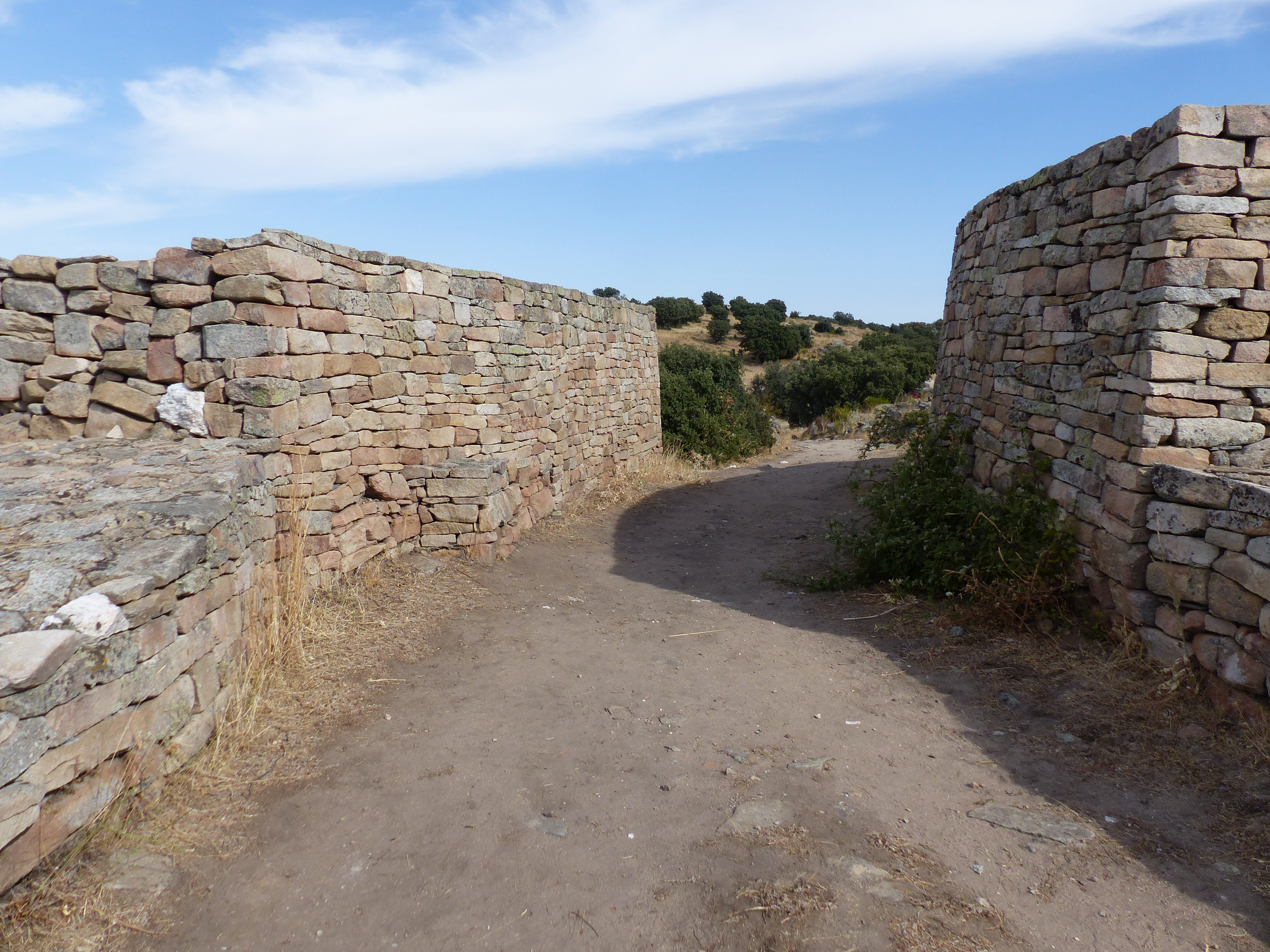
Cogotas II. Castro del Cogotas. Reconstruction of the main entrance

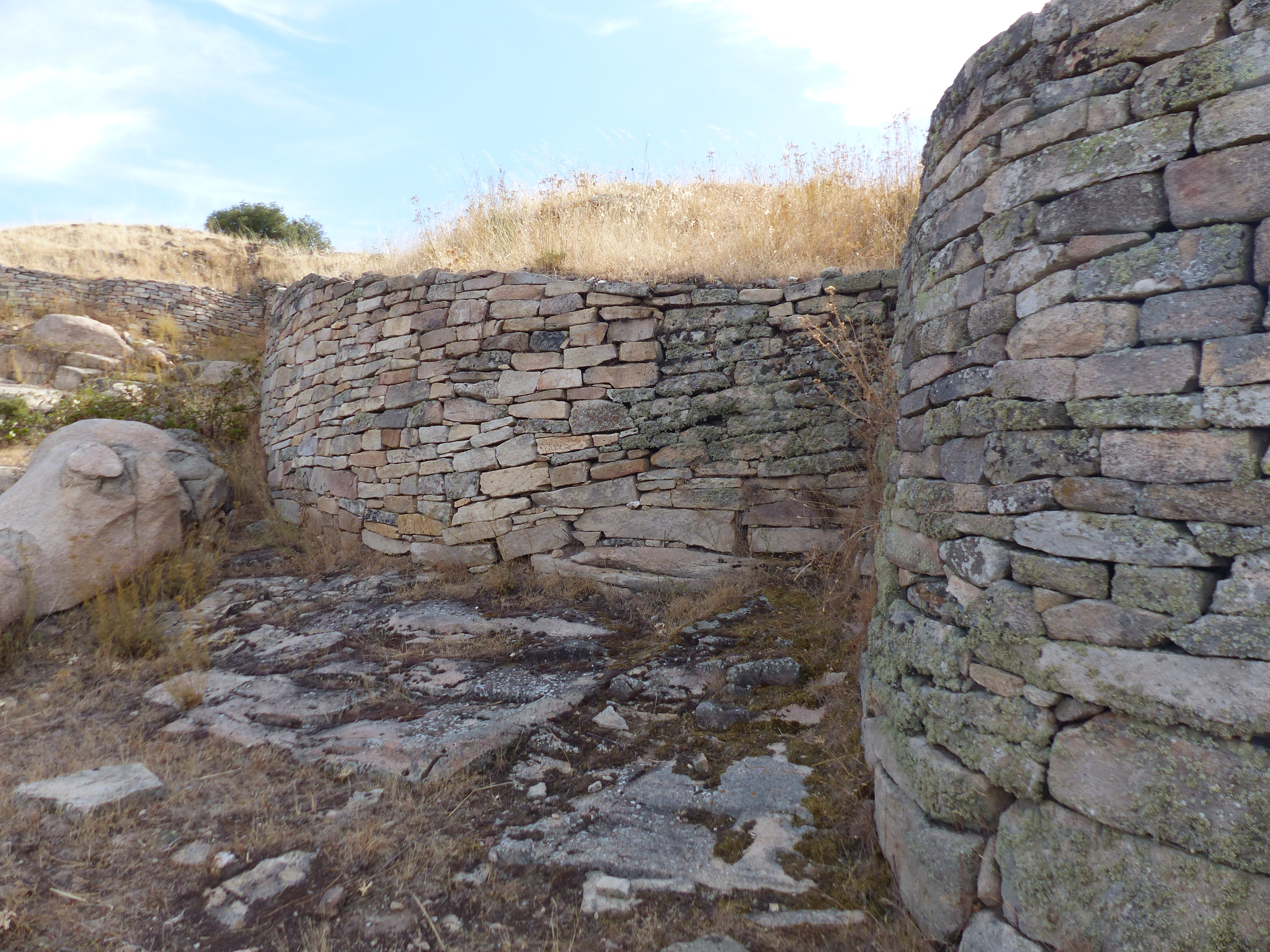
Cogotas II

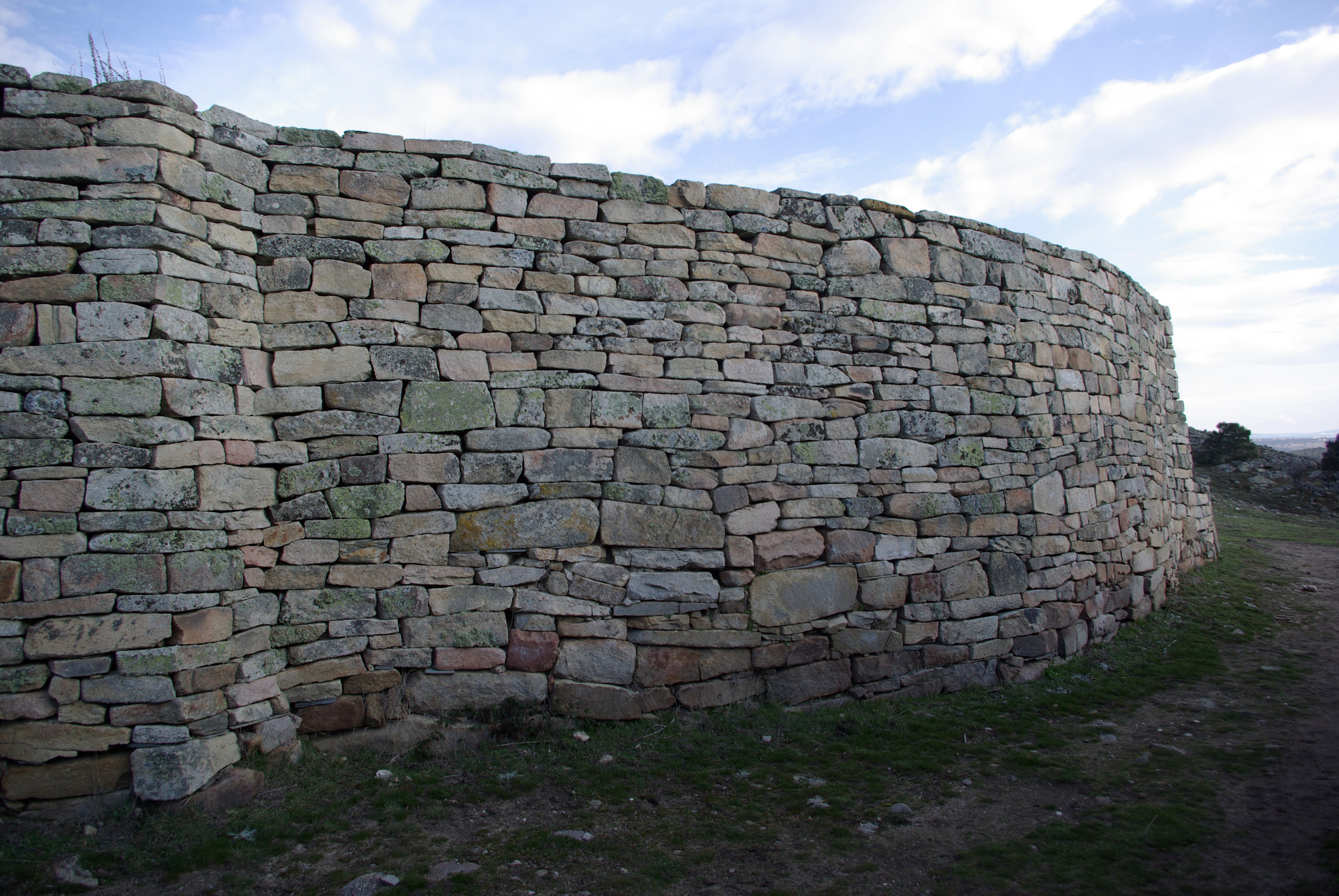
Cogotas II. Castro del Cogotas. Stone walls

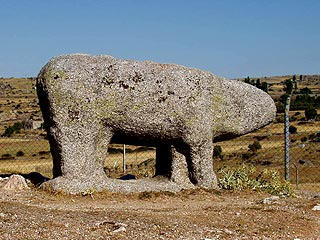
Cogotas II. A granite verraco near Mingorria

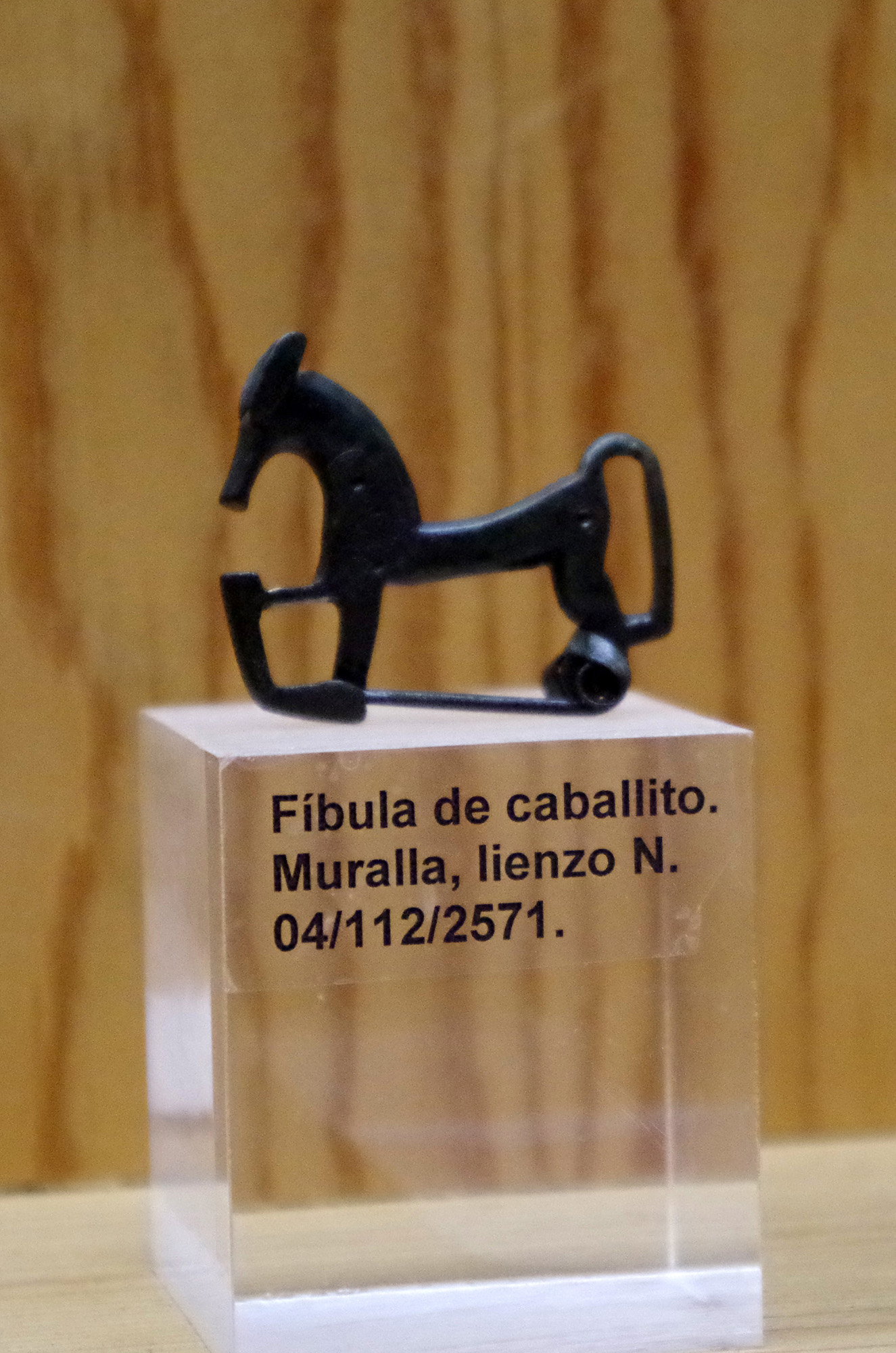
Cogotas II

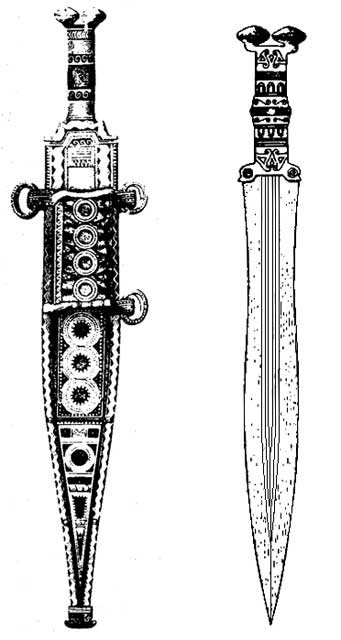
Cogotas II

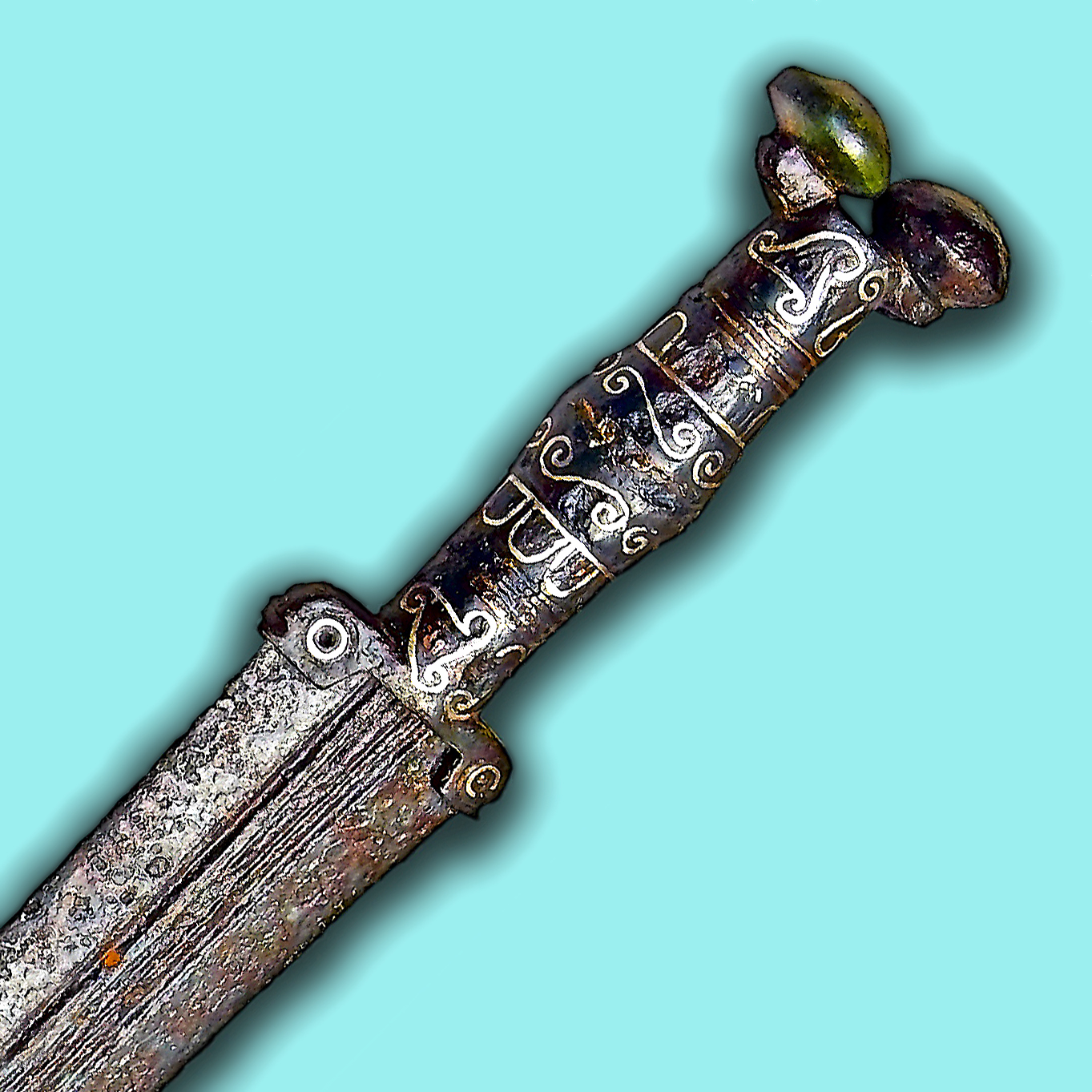
Cogotas II

== Literature ==
- Historia de Castilla y León. 1. La prehistoria del Valle del Duero, Valladolid, 1985. G. Delibes.
- La Cultura de las Cogotas I, Actas del Homenaje a Luis Siret, Sevilla, 1986. Mª. D. Fernández Posse.
