= Talavera la Nueva =

- EATIM
- Flag Coat of arms

- Location in Spain Talavera la Nueva (Spain)
- Coordinates: 39°56′10″N 4°53′33″W
- Country: Spain
- Autonomous community: Castile-La Mancha
- Province: Toledo
- Municipality: Talavera de la Reina

Talavera la Nueva is an EATIM ("administrative territorial entity below municipality") belonging to the municipality of Talavera de la Reina, Spain.

== History ==
Located 5 km away from the city proper of Talavera de la Reina, it was founded by the Instituto Nacional de Colonización (INC) during the Francoist dictatorship as a planned settlement oriented to cattle farming. It was formally inaugurated on 5 October 1956 by the dictator, although colonizers already dwelled in the settlement since at least 2 or 3 years before the ceremony.

== Archeological site ==
The archeological site of the Roman Villa of El Saucedo is located in the area. A largely intact verraco was found in the former.
