= El Oso, Ávila =

El Oso
- Municipality and Town
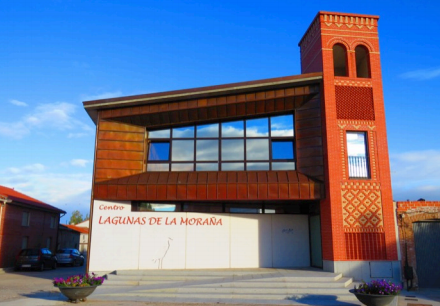

- Location in Spain. El Oso (Spain)
- Coordinates: 40°50′30″N 4°46′14″W
- Country: Spain
- Autonomous community: Castile and León
- Province: Ávila
- Municipality: El Oso

Government
  - Alcalde (Mayor): Luciano Arroyo Martín (PSOE)

Area
  - Total: 18.49 km^{2} (7.14 sq mi)
- Elevation: 893 m (2,930 ft)

Population (2025-01-01)
  - Total: 125
  - Density: 6.76/km^{2} (17.5/sq mi)
- Time zone: UTC+1 (CET)
  - Summer (DST): UTC+2 (CEST)
- Website: Official website

El Oso is a municipality (pop. 229) in the Spanish province of Ávila, in the autonomous community of Castile-Leon.

The village takes its name (which means "the bear") from a megalithic monument outside the church. The monument in question may not have been intended to represent a bear. It is classed as a Verraco, a type of prehistoric monument found in central Spain, which shares its name with the Spanish word for a boar. Local legend identifies this example as a bear.

== Population ==
Historical population
| Year | Pop. | ±% p.a. |
|---|---|---|
| 2023 | 136 | — |
| 2024 | 129 | −5.15% |
| 2025 | 125 | −3.10% |
Source: INE
