= Solosancho =

- municipality
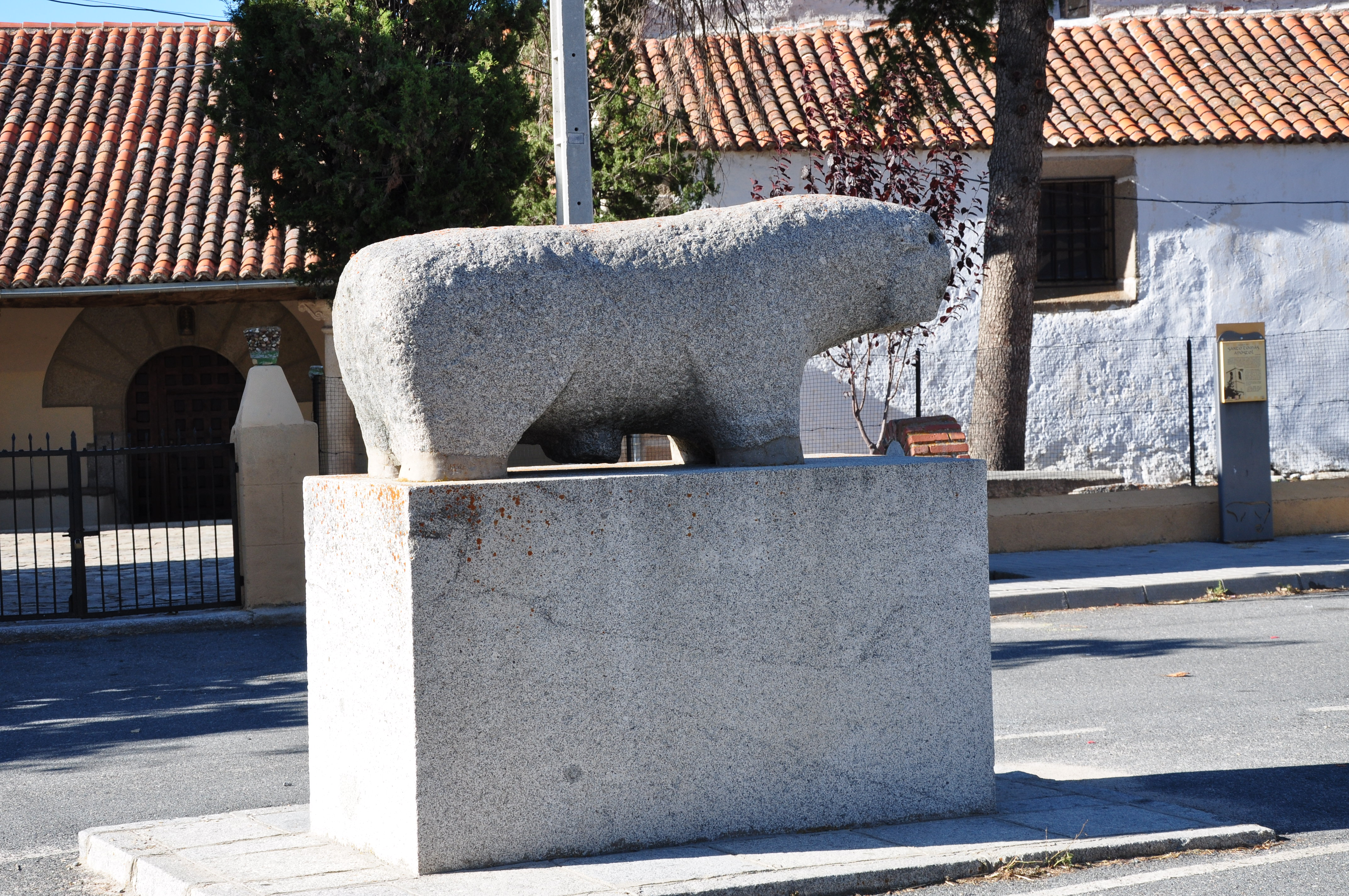
- Verraco of Solosancho

- Flag Coat of arms

- Location in Spain. Solosancho (Spain)
- Coordinates: 40°33′13″N 4°54′22″W
- Country: Spain
- Autonomous community: Castile and León
- Province: Ávila

Area
  - Total: 54.4 km^{2} (21.0 sq mi)
- Elevation: 1,118 m (3,668 ft)

Population (2025-01-01)
  - Total: 750
  - Density: 14/km^{2} (36/sq mi)
- Time zone: UTC+1 (CET)
  - Summer (DST): UTC+2 (CEST)
- Website: Official website

Solosancho is a municipality located in the province of Ávila, Castile and León, Spain.

== Population ==
Historical population
Year	Pop.	±% p.a.
2023	779	—
2024	758	−2.70%
2025	750	−1.06%
Source: INE

== Images ==
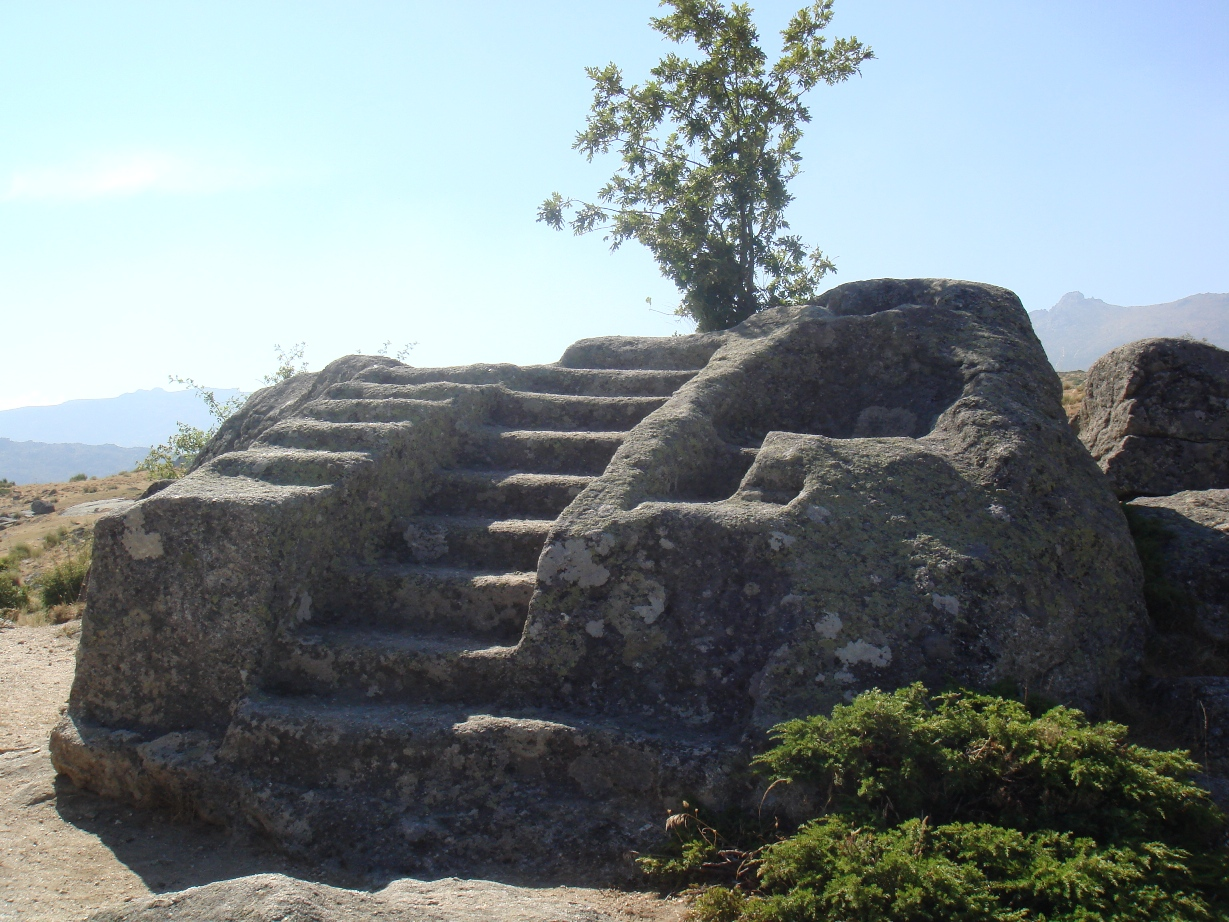
Ulaca, Solosancho: prehistoric monument

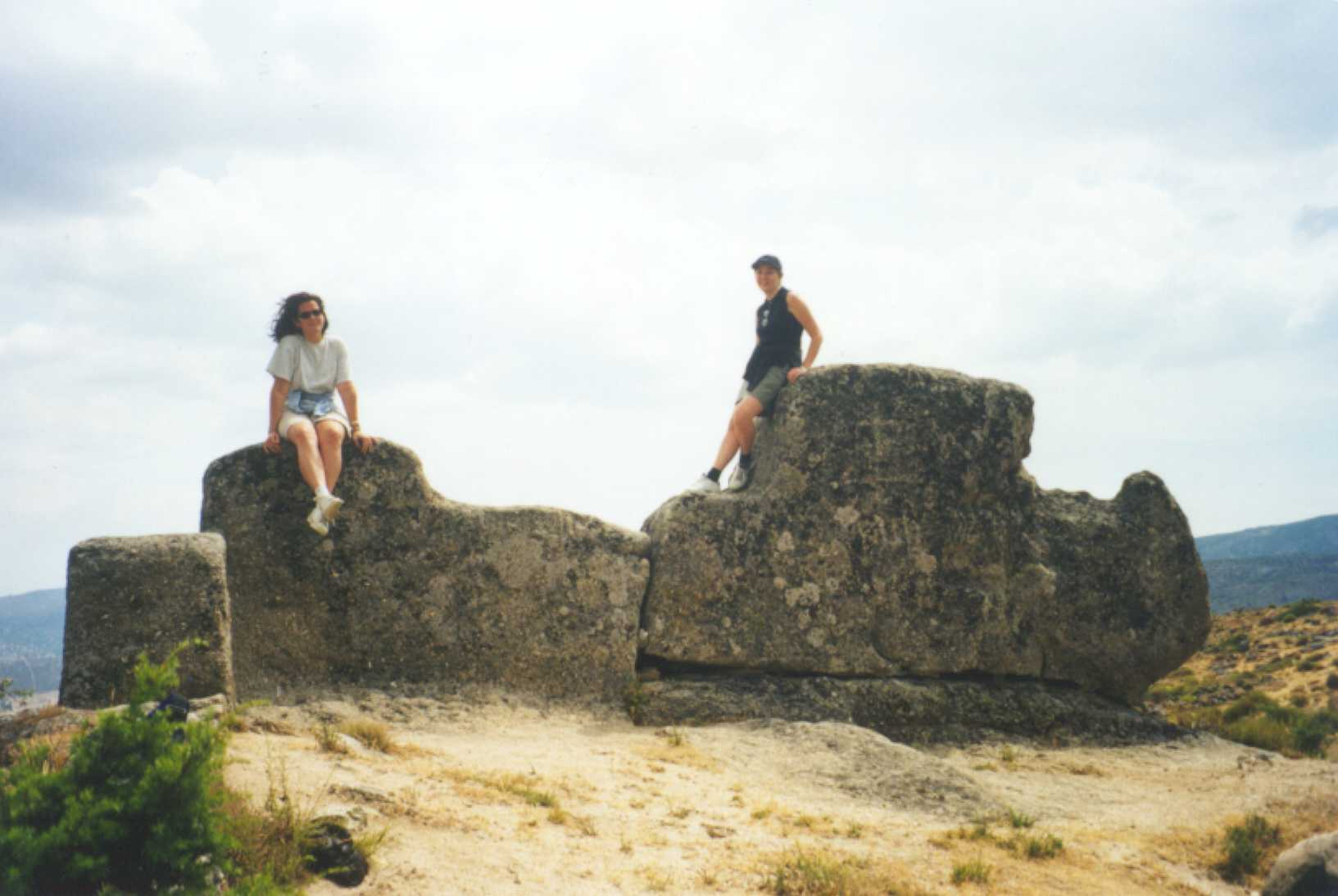
Walls of Ulaca, built in the Bronze Age.

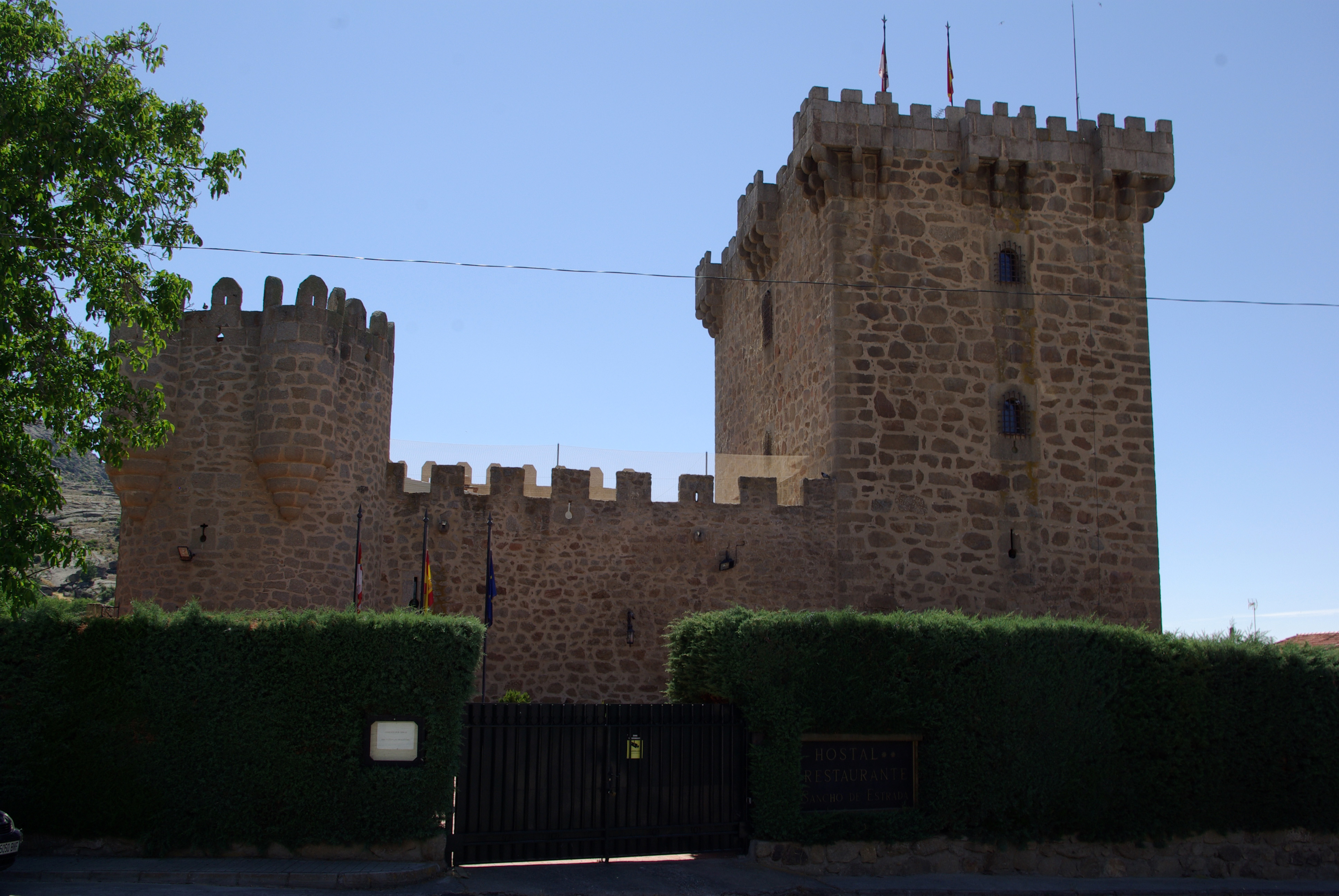
Castle of Villaviciosa, in Solosancho municipality.

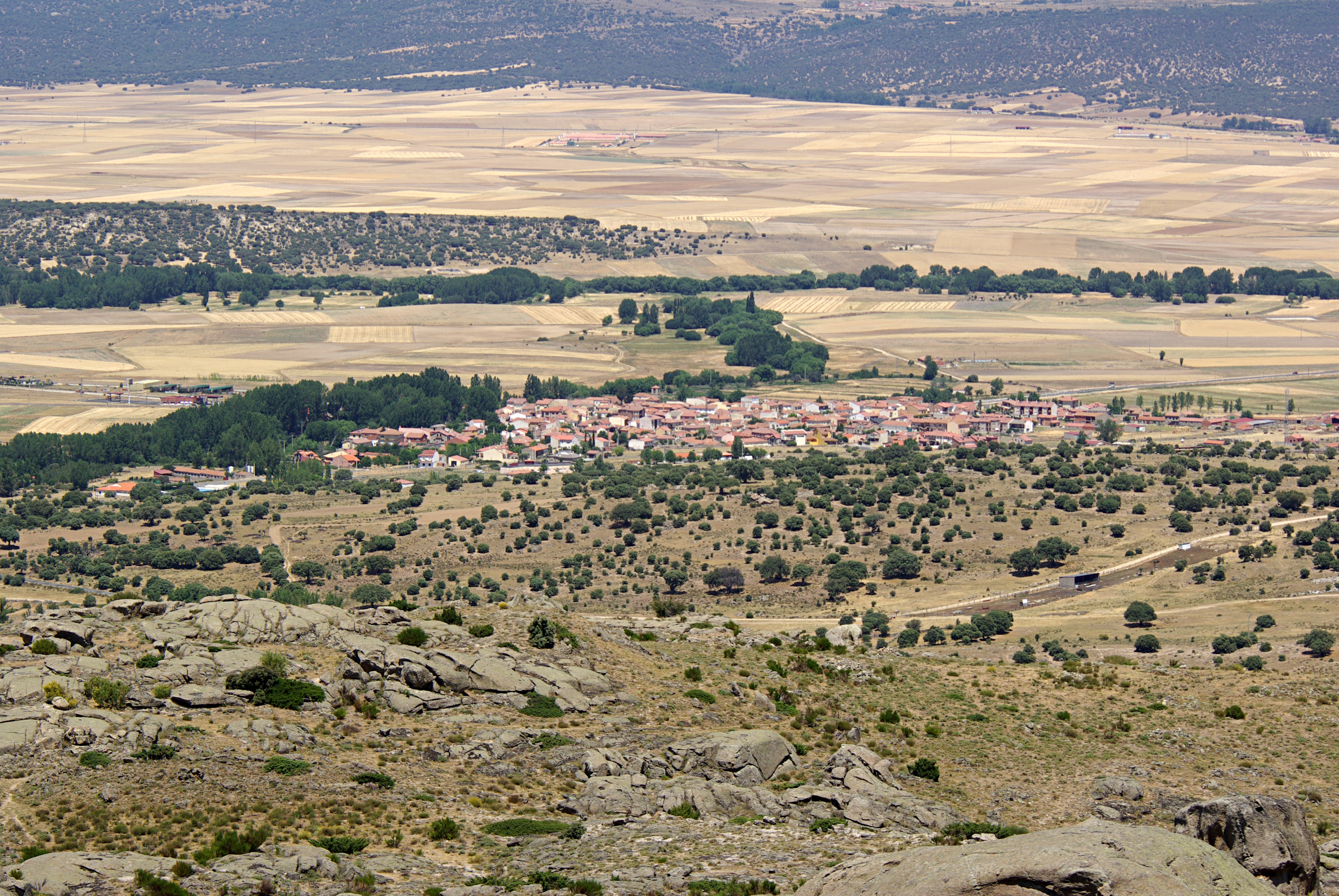
View of Solosancho
