= Villanueva del Campillo =

- municipality
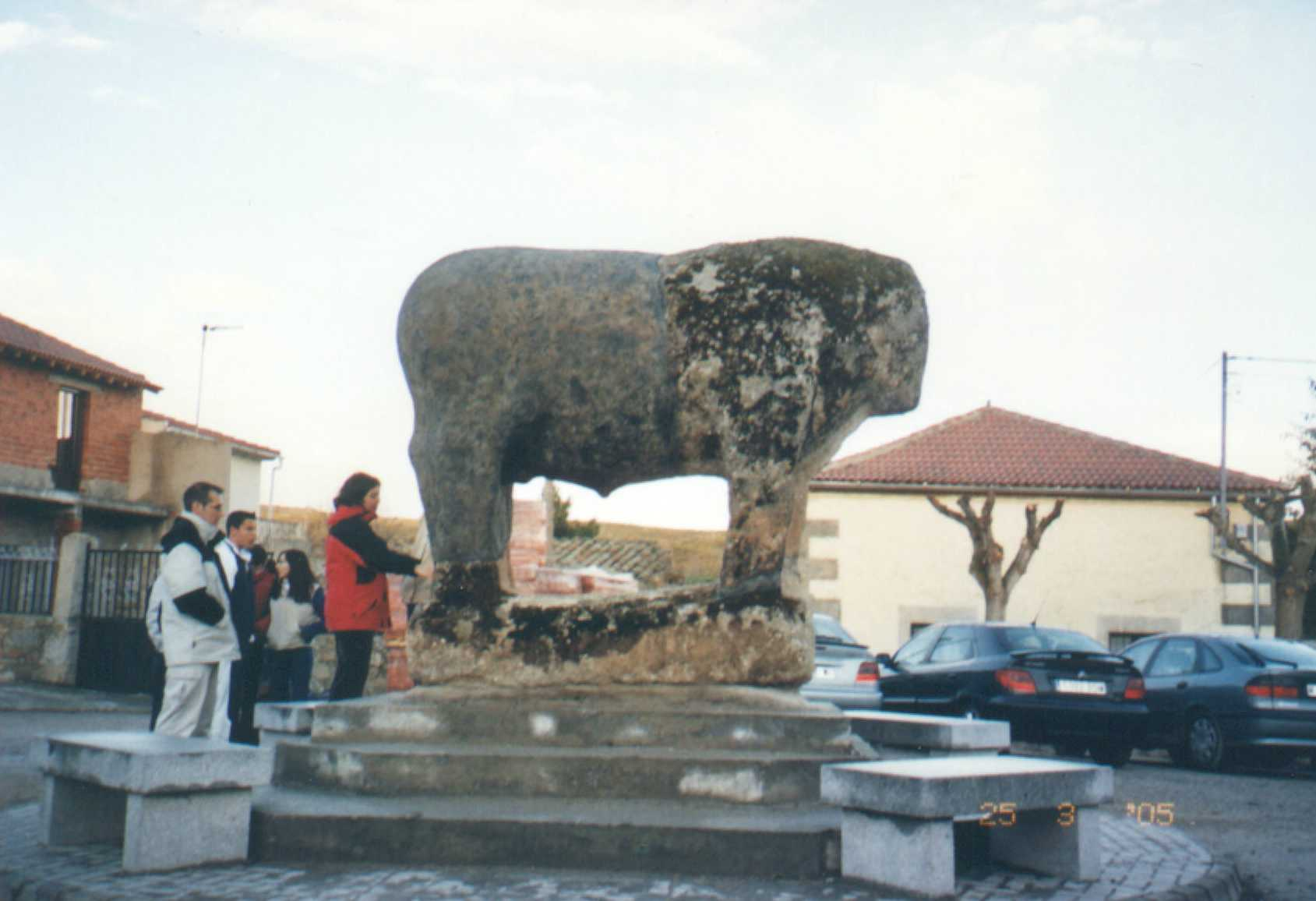

- Location in Spain. Villanueva del Campillo (Spain)
- Coordinates: 40°34′42″N 5°10′48″W
- Country: Spain
- Autonomous community: Castile and León
- Province: Ávila
- Municipality: Villanueva del Campillo

Area
  - Total: 45 km^{2} (17 sq mi)
- Elevation: 1,449 m (4,754 ft)

Population (2025-01-01)
  - Total: 107
  - Density: 2.4/km^{2} (6.2/sq mi)
- Time zone: UTC+1 (CET)
  - Summer (DST): UTC+2 (CEST)
- Website: Official website

Villanueva del Campillo is a municipality located in the province of Ávila, Castile and León, Spain. The village is famous for its verraco, an ancient sculpture, which was found half-buried. The verraco has been reerected in the plaza mayor: the rear part of the animal was missing and has been reconstructed.

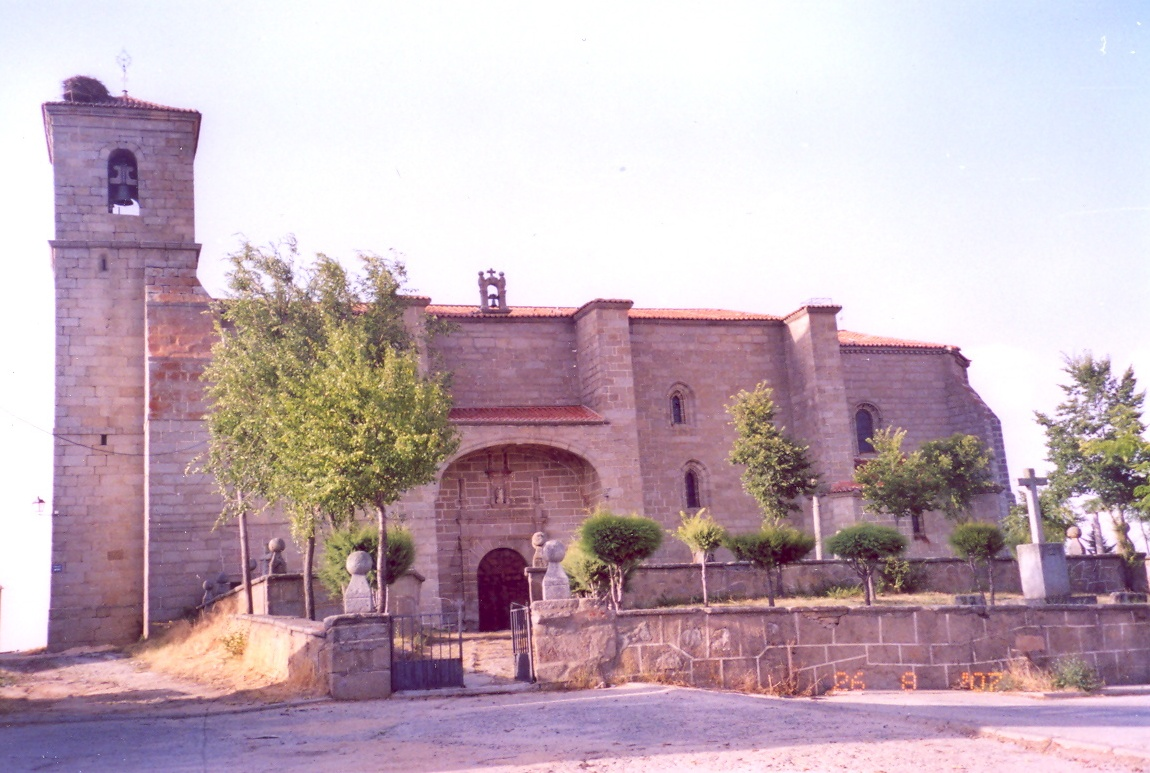
Villanueva del Campillo Church, of templar origin.

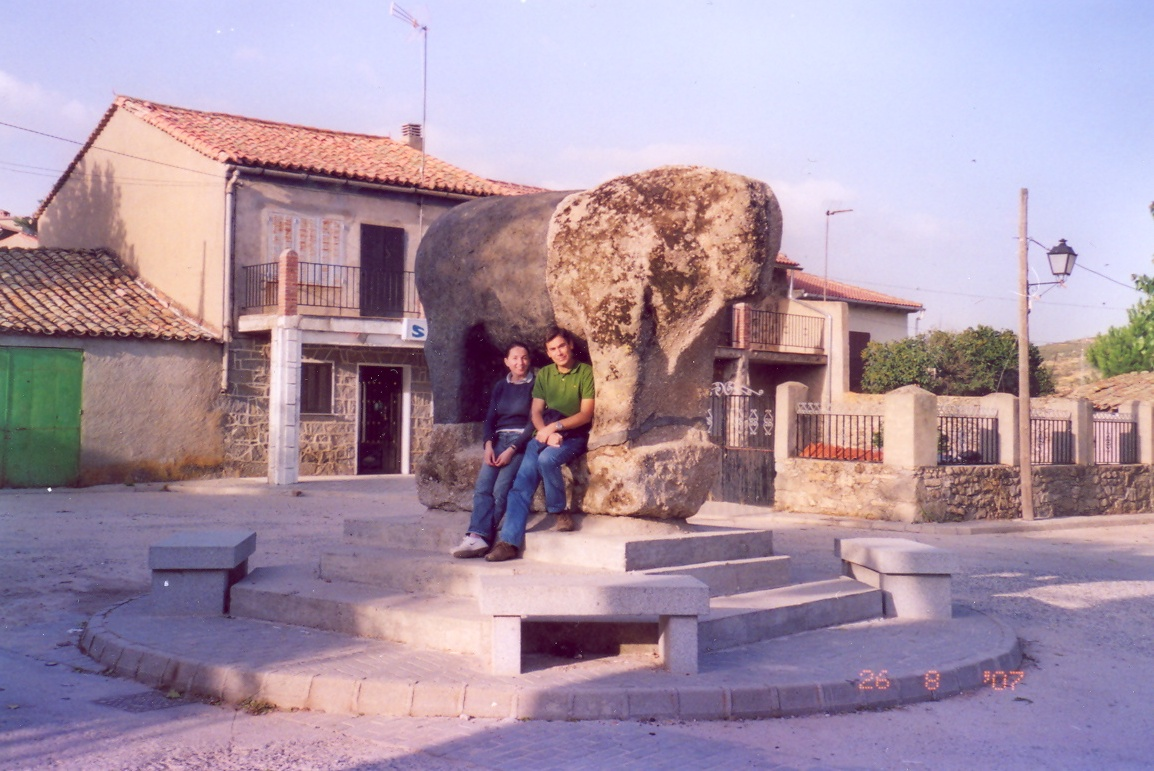
The verraco in the town is the largest found in the Iberian peninsula.

== Population ==
Historical population
Year	Pop.	±% p.a.
2023	105	—
2024	101	−3.81%
2025	107	+5.94%
Source: INE

== Notable people ==
- Ricardo Blázquez (born 1942), prelate of the Catholic Church
