= Martiherrero =

- municipality
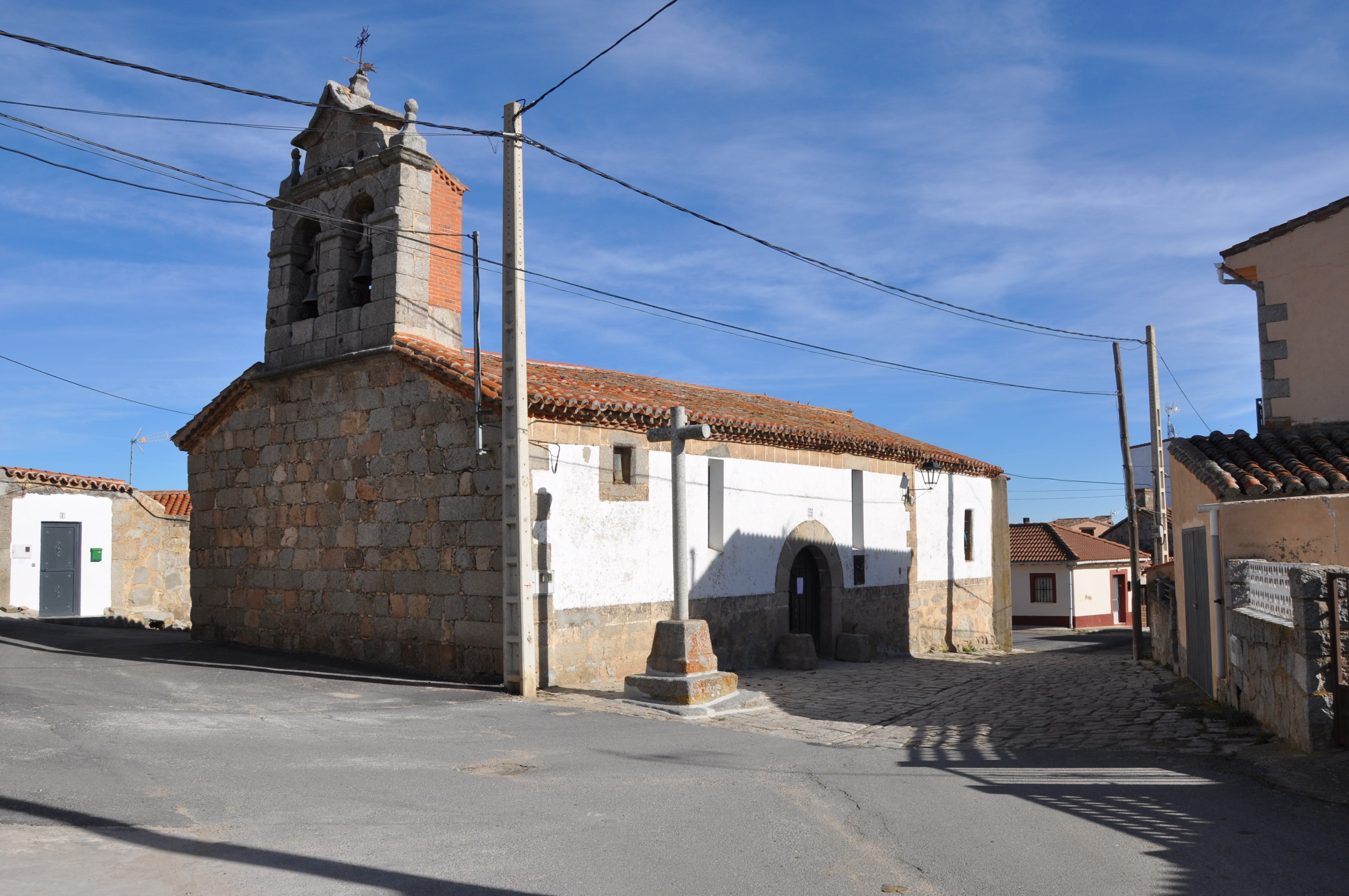
- Parish Church of Our Lady of the Assumption

- Flag Coat of arms

- Location in Spain. Martiherrero (Spain)
- Coordinates: 40°40′27″N 4°46′52″W
- Country: Spain
- Autonomous community: Castile and León
- Province: Ávila
- Municipality: Martiherrero

Area
  - Total: 22 km^{2} (8.5 sq mi)

Population (2025-01-01)
  - Total: 372
  - Density: 17/km^{2} (44/sq mi)
- Time zone: UTC+1 (CET)
  - Summer (DST): UTC+2 (CEST)
- Website: Official website

Martiherrero is a municipality located in the province of Ávila, Castile and León, Spain.

== Population ==
Historical population
Year	Pop.	±% p.a.
2023	356	—
2024	361	+1.40%
2025	372	+3.05%
Source: INE
