= Mirueña de los Infanzones =

- municipality
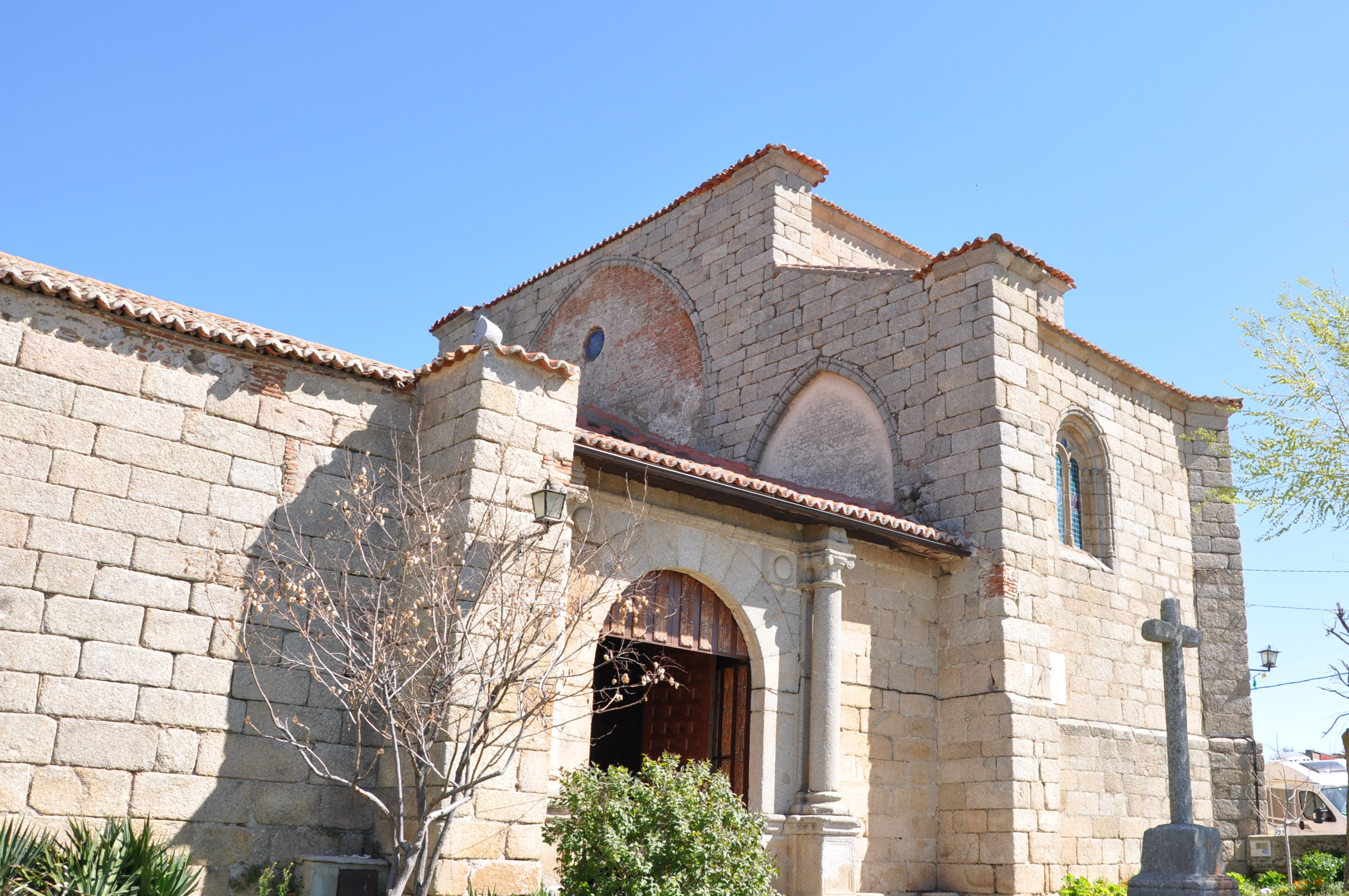
- Church of the Assumption in Mirueña de los Infanzones

- Flag Coat of arms

- Extension of the municipal term within the province of Ávila

- Location in Spain. Mirueña de los Infanzones (Spain)
- Coordinates: 40°44′15″N 5°05′27″W
- Country: Spain
- Autonomous community: Castile and León
- Province: Ávila
- Municipality: Mirueña de los Infanzones

Area
  - Total: 31.12 km^{2} (12.02 sq mi)
- Elevation: 1 m (3.3 ft)

Population (2025-01-01)
  - Total: 86
  - Density: 2.8/km^{2} (7.2/sq mi)
- Time zone: UTC+1 (CET)
  - Summer (DST): UTC+2 (CEST)
- Website: Official website

Mirueña de los Infanzones is a municipality located in the province of Ávila, Castile and León, Spain.

== Population ==
Historical population
Year	Pop.	±% p.a.
2023	88	—
2024	95	+7.95%
2025	86	−9.47%
Source: INE
