= Mingorría =

- municipality
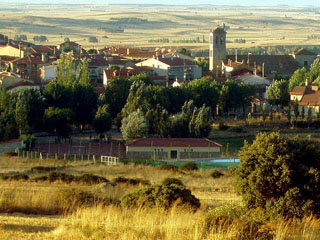
- View of Mingorría.

- Flag Coat of arms

- Location in Spain. Mingorría (Spain)
- Coordinates: 40°45′03″N 4°39′55″W
- Country: Spain
- Autonomous community: Castile and León
- Province: Ávila

Area
  - Total: 30 km^{2} (12 sq mi)

Population (2025-01-01)
  - Total: 422
  - Density: 14/km^{2} (36/sq mi)
- Time zone: UTC+1 (CET)
  - Summer (DST): UTC+2 (CEST)
- Website: Official website

Mingorría is a municipality located in the province of Ávila, Castile and León, Spain. The origin of Mingorría is quite obscure; its names has, or it seems to have, some Basque roots: from Mendigorría, red hill in Basque language, but there are not definitive signs of that origin. Landscape of Mingorría shows granite blocks and evergreen oaks in an open field. Climate is typically interior Mediterranean with cold winters (negative temperatures are very common), warm summers, and a very dry atmosphere. As in other areas of Castile and León this place has lost its population since the 1960s, when rural life started to decline in mainland Spain.

Farming was a part of traditional economy, but stonework was the most prevalent activity until the early 1890s. This sector emerged after the opening of railway in 1870 allowing to export granite stonework to other regions.

== Population ==
Historical population
Year	Pop.	±% p.a.
2023	389	—
2024	410	+5.40%
2025	422	+2.93%
Source: INE

== Gallery ==
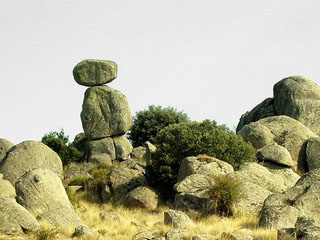
Piedra caballera

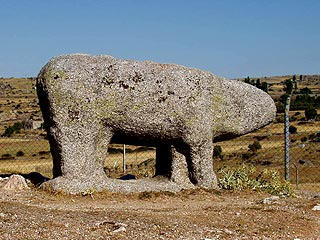
Celtic Verraco, built in the Bronze Age

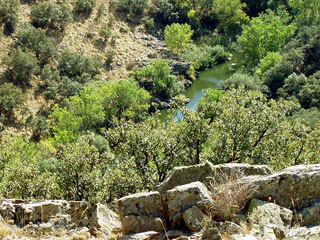
View of Adaja River

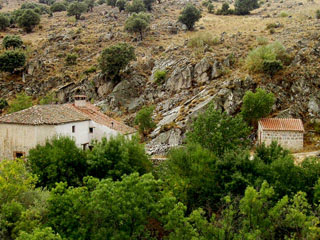
Mill in Mingorría
