= Tornadizos de Ávila =

- municipality
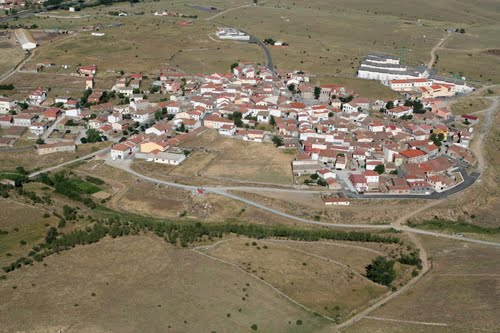
- Aerial view of Tornadizos de Ávila

- Flag Coat of arms

- Location in Spain. Tornadizos de Ávila (Spain)
- Coordinates: 40°37′34″N 4°36′55″W
- Country: Spain
- Autonomous community: Castile and León
- Province: Ávila
- Municipality: Tornadizos de Ávila

Area
  - Total: 95 km^{2} (37 sq mi)

Population (2025-01-01)
  - Total: 458
  - Density: 4.8/km^{2} (12/sq mi)
- Time zone: UTC+1 (CET)
  - Summer (DST): UTC+2 (CEST)
- Website: Official website

Tornadizos de Ávila is a municipality located in the province of Ávila, Castile and León, Spain.

== Population ==
Historical population
Year	Pop.	±% p.a.
2023	456	—
2024	465	+1.97%
2025	458	−1.51%
Source: INE
