= Santo Domingo de las Posadas =

- municipality
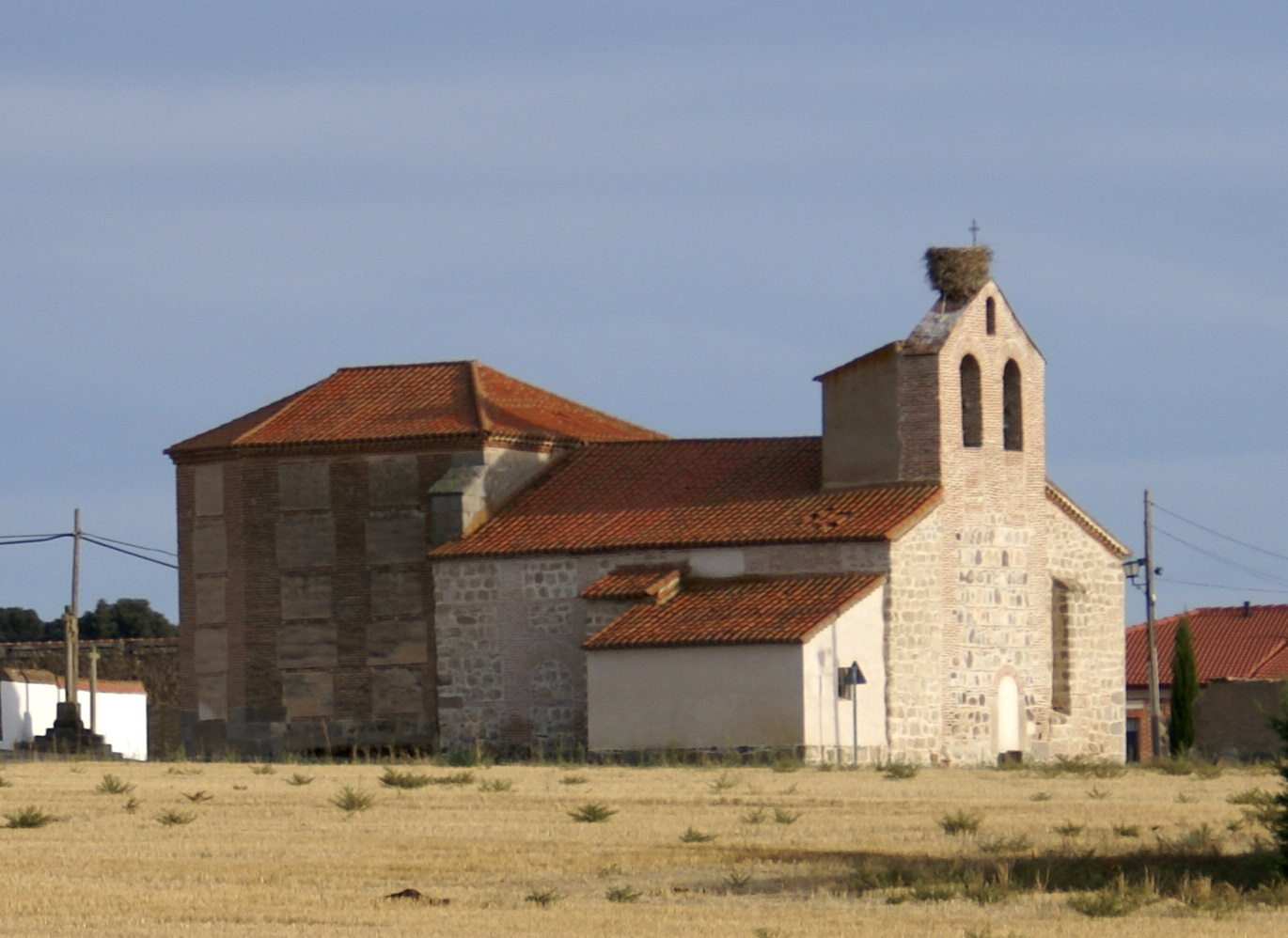
- Church of Santo Domingo de las Posadas

- Flag Coat of arms

- Location in Spain. Santo Domingo de las Posadas (Spain)
- Coordinates: 40°48′44″N 4°38′01″W
- Country: Spain
- Autonomous community: Castile and León
- Province: Ávila

Area
  - Total: 13 km^{2} (5.0 sq mi)

Population (2025-01-01)
  - Total: 71
  - Density: 5.5/km^{2} (14/sq mi)
- Time zone: UTC+1 (CET)
  - Summer (DST): UTC+2 (CEST)
- Website: Official website

Santo Domingo de las Posadas is a municipality located in the province of Ávila, Castile and León, Spain.

== Population ==
Historical population
| Year | Pop. | ±% p.a. |
|---|---|---|
| 2023 | 72 | — |
| 2024 | 69 | −4.17% |
| 2025 | 71 | +2.90% |
Source: INE
