= Cardeñosa =

- municipality
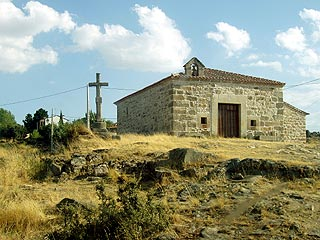
- Hermitage in Cardeñosa

- Location in Spain. Cardeñosa (Spain)
- Coordinates: 40°44′30″N 4°44′43″W
- Country: Spain
- Autonomous community: Castile and León
- Province: Ávila
- Municipality: Cardeñosa

Area
  - Total: 40.50 km^{2} (15.64 sq mi)
- Elevation: 1,105 m (3,625 ft)

Population (2025-01-01)
  - Total: 430
  - Density: 11/km^{2} (27/sq mi)
- Time zone: UTC+1 (CET)
  - Summer (DST): UTC+2 (CEST)
- Website: Official website

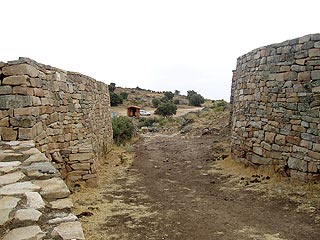
Cogotas II Iron Age stone walls at Las Cogotas

Cardeñosa is a municipality located in the province of Ávila, Castile and León, Spain. According to the 2025 census (INE), the municipality had a population of 430 inhabitants.

== Population ==
Historical population
Year	Pop.	±% p.a.
2023	419	—
2024	419	+0.00%
2025	430	+2.63%
Source: INE
