= Santa María del Arroyo =

- municipality
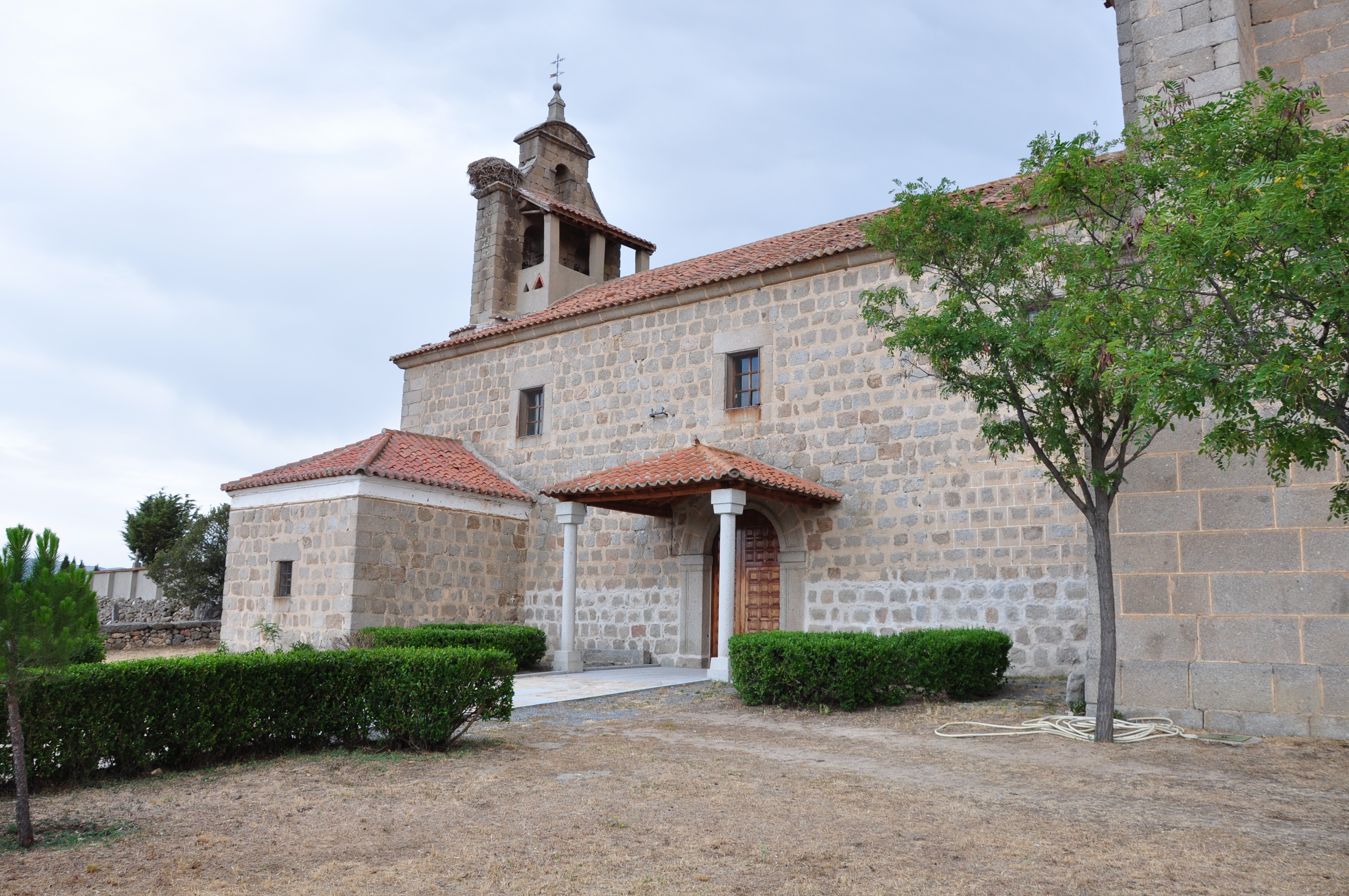
- Parish Church of the Assumption of Our Lady, Santa María del Arroyo
- Flag Coat of arms
- Location in Spain. Santa María del Arroyo (Spain)
- Coordinates: 40°36′01″N 4°55′20″W
- Country: Spain
- Autonomous community: Castile and León
- Province: Ávila
- Municipality: Santa María del Arroyo

Area
  - Total: 11.13 km^{2} (4.30 sq mi)
- Elevation: 1,152 m (3,780 ft)

Population (2025-01-01)
  - Total: 103
  - Density: 9.25/km^{2} (24.0/sq mi)
- Time zone: UTC+1 (CET)
  - Summer (DST): UTC+2 (CEST)
- Website: Official website

Santa María del Arroyo is a municipality located in the province of Ávila, Castile and León, Spain.

== Population ==
Historical population
Year	Pop.	±% p.a.
2023	101	—
2024	102	+0.99%
2025	103	+0.98%
Source: INE
