= Verraco of the bridge =

Verraco in Salamanca, Spain

- Bull of the bridge
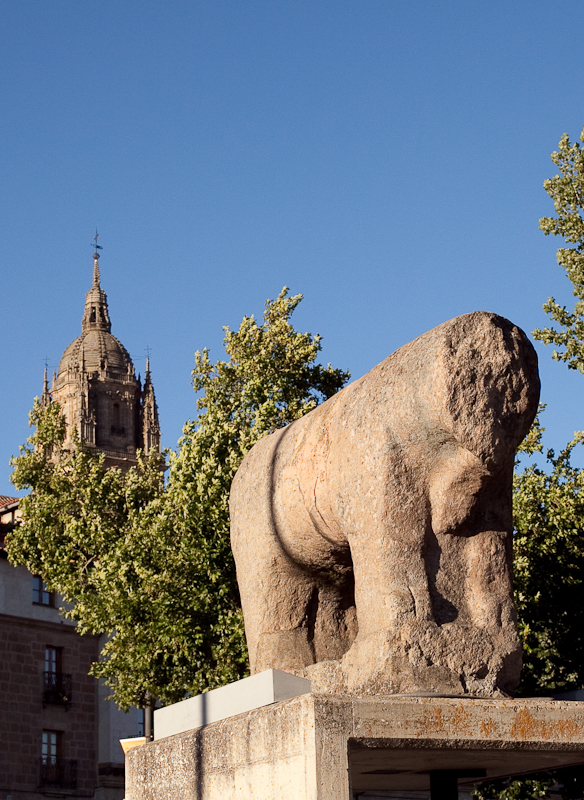
- Verraco of the bridge with the cathedral of Salamanca behind

- Location within Spain
- 40°57′33″N 5°40′09″W
- Periods: Iron Age
- Cultures: Vettones
- Location: Salamanca, Spain

History
- Built: 3rd–1st century BC

Site notes
- Material: stone

The verraco of the bridge (Spanish: Verraco del puente) in Salamanca, Spain, is an Iron Age stone statue depicting a bull, placed at the entrance of the Roman bridge. Verraco is a general term that refers to the stone statues of animals made by the Vettones, one of the pre-Roman peoples of the Iberian Peninsula. In Spanish the word verraco [beˈrako] means "breeding pig", but other animals such as bulls and bears were also represented.

The verraco of the bridge is also known as the "bull of Salamanca", or the "bull of the bridge". It is the oldest statue in the city and appears in its coat of arms. Its dimensions are 2.10 metres (6 ft 11 in) long, 1.57 metres (5 ft 2 in) meters tall, and 70 centimetres (2.3 ft) wide. The head is missing and the body broken in half, but was rebuilt.

== History ==
Coat of arms of Salamanca, with the bull over the bridge

The verracos were erected by the Vettones tribes in the late Iron Age, in several locations across the west of the meseta - the high central plain of the Iberian Peninsula. In the city of Salamanca this bull sculpture has been next to the Roman bridge since the end of the 12th century, as mentioned in documents and literature.

In 1834 the provincial governor José María Cambronero ordered the verraco to be thrown into the Tormes River, mistakenly believing that it had been placed on the bridge by king Charles I of Spain, as a mark related to the events of the Revolt of the Comuneros, in which Salamanca participated. This caused the statue to break in three pieces.

In 1867 the statue was rescued to be placed in the Convento de San Esteban, and moved to various museums afterwards, until it was returned to the Roman bridge in 1954, the year of the fourth centenary anniversary of the publication of the Lazarillo de Tormes. It initially was located in the middle of the bridge, but has been at the entrance since 1993.

The statue has suffered minor vandalism over the years, for example in 2016 and 2019.

== Interpretations ==
The Vettones left behind similar figures across the territory they occupied, both in Spain and Portugal. These zoomorphic statues represent breeding pigs, but also other animals such as bulls, bears, and wild boars. They are recognizable artistic expressions of their culture, but the meaning is unclear and several theories have tried to explain their significance. For example, it has been said that the verracos served as boundary markers for borders and lands dedicated to cattle grazing, that they are related to Heracles, or had a mystic or religious role in the worship of nature deities, fertility, or the dead.

The symbol of the bull has been identified with Osiris, or with the strength of a river, with Juan Horozco y Covarrubias commenting in the sixteenth century that the noise of the river sounds like the bellowing of a bull, and for this reason the Romans placed it next to the river.

Research done at the Universidad Autónoma de Madrid distinguishes among three types of verracos, each with a different likely function. The study concludes that the larger figures of bulls and without inscriptions, like the bull of the bridge in Salamanca, would have been carved for protection of cattle and natural resources.

== Literary references ==
The verraco of the bridge was mentioned in the 1554 picaresque novel Lazarillo de Tormes:

We left Salamanca and we came to a bridge; and at the edge of this bridge there's a stone statue of an animal that looks something like a bull. The blind man told me to go up next to the animal, and when I was there he said, "Lazaro, put your ear up next to this bull and you'll hear a great sound inside of it. I put my ear next to it very simply, thinking he was telling the truth. And when he felt my head near the statue, he doubled up his fist and knocked my head into that devil of a bull so hard that I felt the pain from its horns for three days. And he said to me, "You fool, now learn that a blind man's servant has to be one step ahead of the devil." And he laughed out loud at his joke.

It also appears in El mejor maestro, el tiempo (1615), by Lope de Vega, where is mentioned along with the bulls of Guisando.
