= Puente del Congosto =

- Municipality
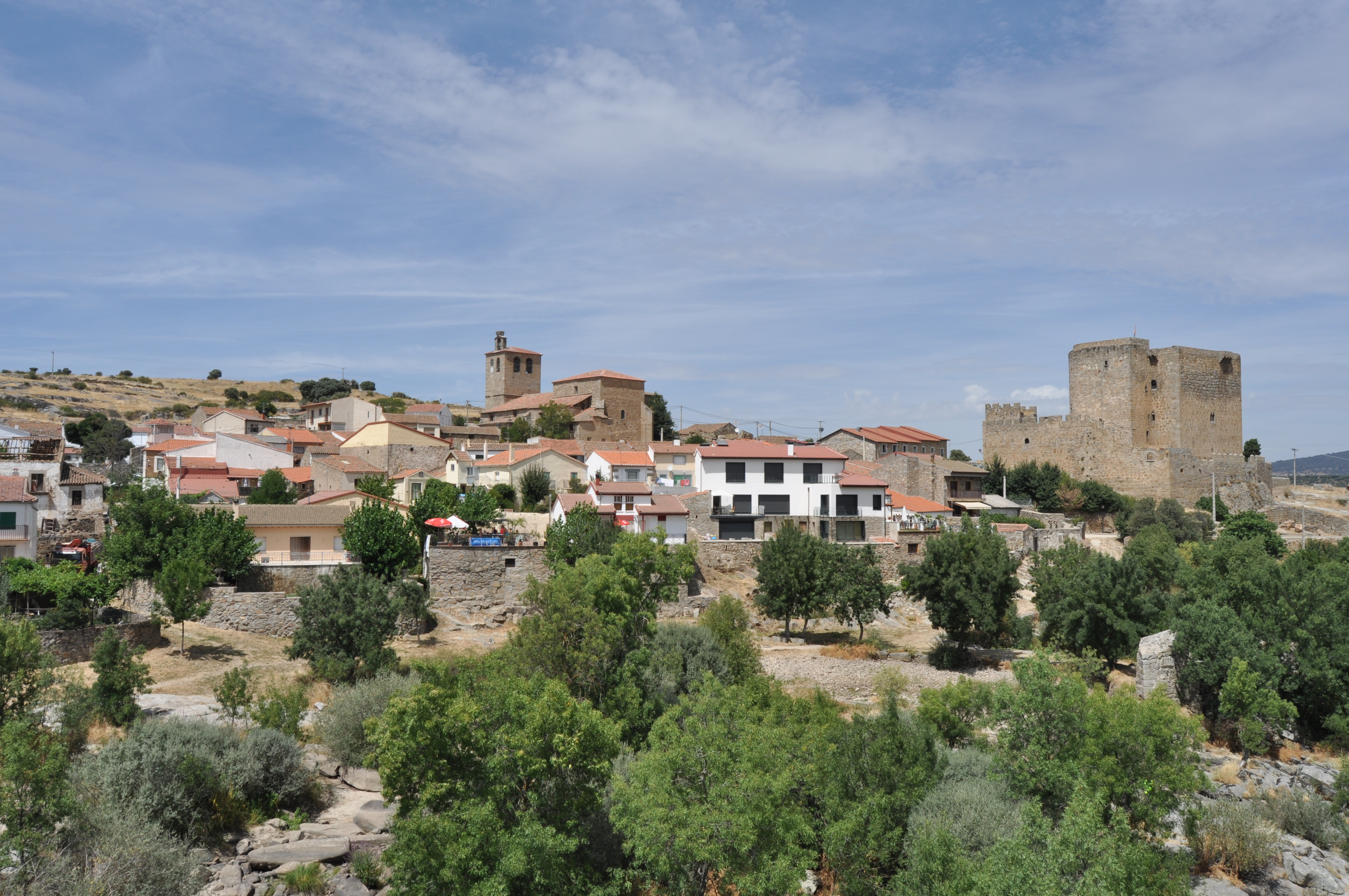
- Panoramic: Church and castle

- Flag Coat of arms

- Location in Salamanca
- Coordinates: 40°30′7″N 5°31′28″W
- Country: Spain
- Autonomous community: Castile and León
- Province: Salamanca
- Comarca: Comarca de Guijuelo
- Subcomarca: Alto Tormes

Government
  - Mayor: José Victorino Delgado Hernández (People's Party)

Area
  - Total: 34 km^{2} (13 sq mi)
- Elevation: 949 m (3,114 ft)

Population (2025-01-01)
  - Total: 236
  - Density: 6.9/km^{2} (18/sq mi)
- Time zone: UTC+1 (CET)
  - Summer (DST): UTC+2 (CEST)
- Postal code: 37748

Puente del Congosto is a municipality located in the province of Salamanca, Castile and León, Spain. It is part of the Comarca de Guijuelo and the subcomarca of Alto Tormes, and falls under the jurisdiction of the judicial district of Béjar.

In 2019, the Governing Council of the Junta of Castile and León declared the Castillo de los Dávila and the medieval fortified bridge over the River Tormes a Site of Cultural Interest, under the designation of Historic Ensemble (Conjunto Histórico). This recognition was due to their strategic role as a key crossing point for livestock along the Cañada Real Soriana Occidental during the transhumance route to Extremadura.

In 2024 the municipality had a population of 225 inhabitants.

== Toponymy ==
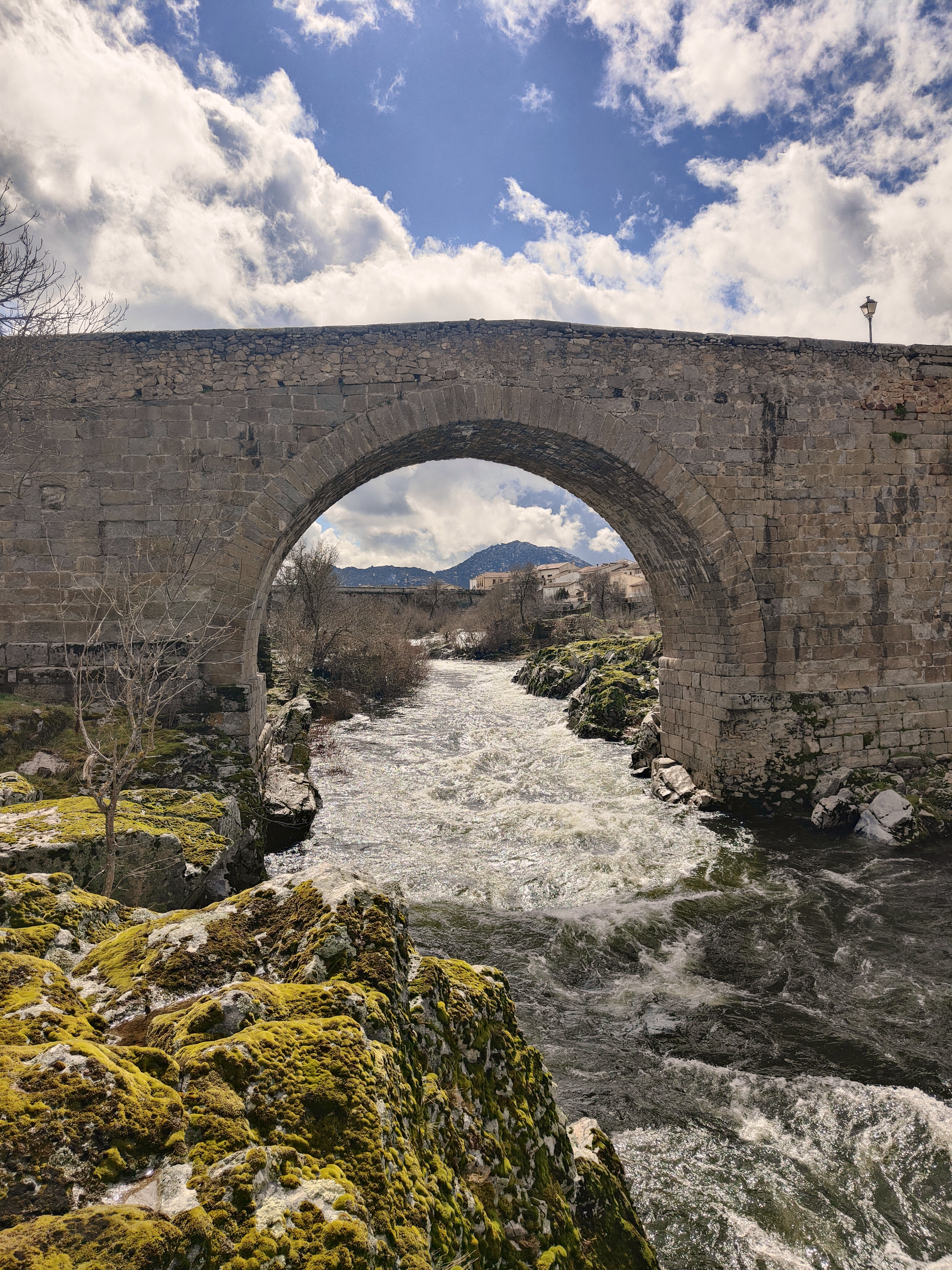
The narrow arch (“Arco Angosto”) of the medieval bridge at Puente del Congosto spans the River Tormes, from which the village takes its name. In the background, the village is visible, along with the New Bridge and, beyond them, Mount Berrueco.

The name Puente del Congosto (Bridge of the Congosto) is apocopic from Puente del Arco Angosto (Bridge of the Narrow Arch). It references the bridge over the river Tormes on the road between Ávila and Ciudad Rodrigo. The bridge had a memorable narrow arch, from which only a side wall exists in the present days.

== History ==
=== Prehistory and Ancient Age ===
Since prehistoric times, this land has been inhabited, particularly nearby Mount Berrueco, an imposing granite promontory that sheltered countless primitive populations, from the Upper Paleolithic to the Romanization. For this reason, it is considered one of the most important archaeological sites in the provinces of Salamanca and Ávila.

Mount Berrueco has stood as a silent witness to the presence of diverse human cultures for more than twelve millennia. Its enduring significance has led to its protection under Spanish heritage laws, and in 1931 it was officially designated a Historic-Artistic Monument.

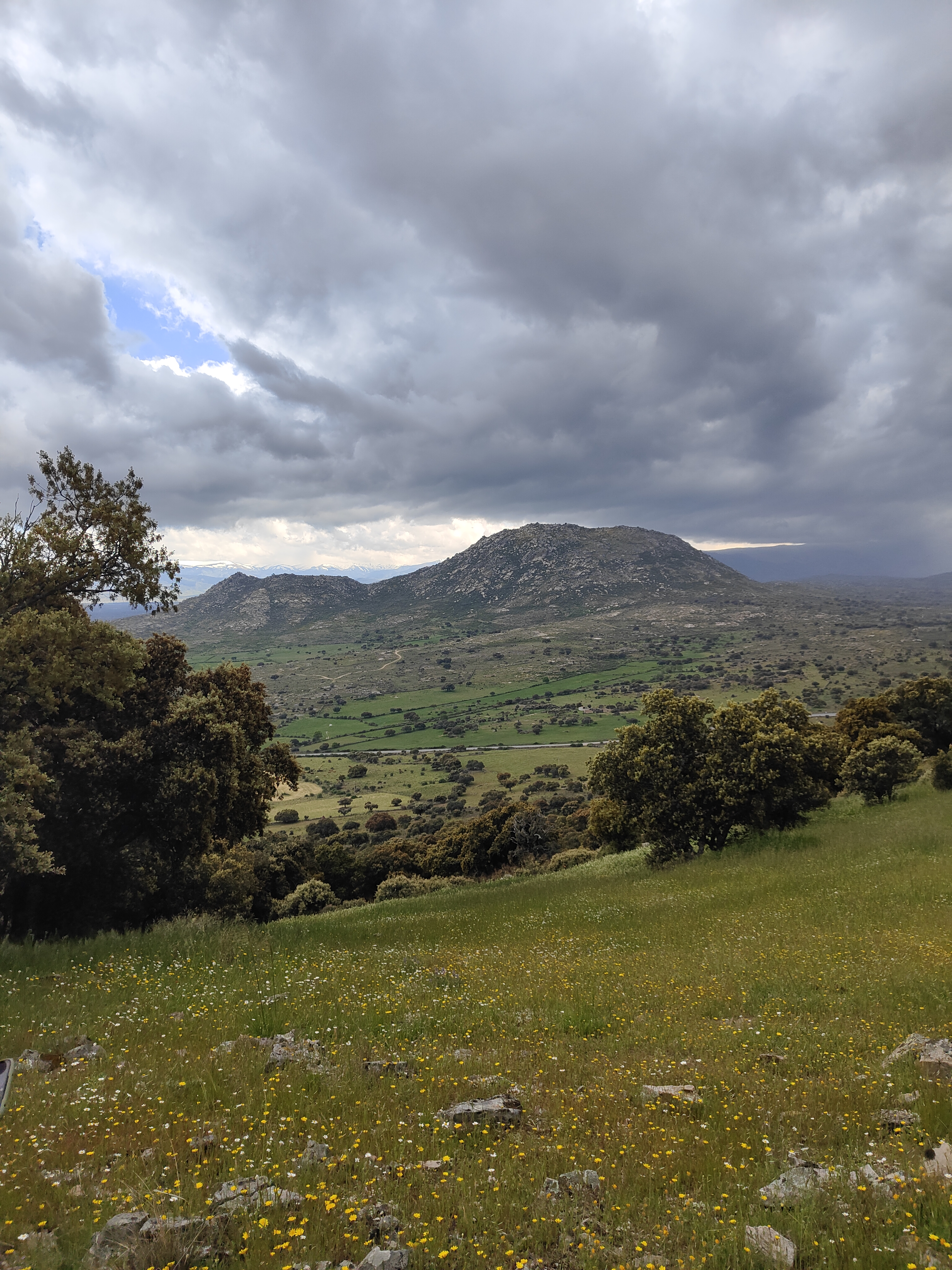
A view of Mount Berrueco from Cabeza Búa.

Its most important settlements in chronological order are:

- La Dehesa · Upper Paleolithic (Magdalenian), more than 12,000 years ago
- La Mariselva · Neolithic and Chalcolithic, from 5,000 to 2,000 BCE
- El Berroquillo · Early Bronze Age, from 1,700 to 1,400 BCE
- Cancho Enamorado · Late Bronze Age, between 1,400 and 1,000 BCE
- Las Paredejas · Iron Age (Early), between 750 and 400 BCE
- Los Tejares · Second Iron Age / Romanization, 4th century BCE
- Santa Lucía / El Hontanar · Visigothic – Medieval period

The excavations carried out at the different settlements on the hill have revealed valuable information about how the climate and vegetation evolved over time. They also offer clues about how communities were structured and organized, how they worked, and which areas they chose to inhabit. Furthermore, it has proven the intense commerce this relatively remote area has due to the discover of objects from the east of the Mediterranean.

Vettonians

One of the most important settlements in the surroundings of Mount Berrueco is Las Paredejas, located within the municipality of Medinilla, in the province of Ávila. It sits on a slightly elevated platform at the northern base of Mount Berrueco. This settlement was inhabited by the Vettones, a Celtic people who occupied the central region of the Iberian Peninsula.

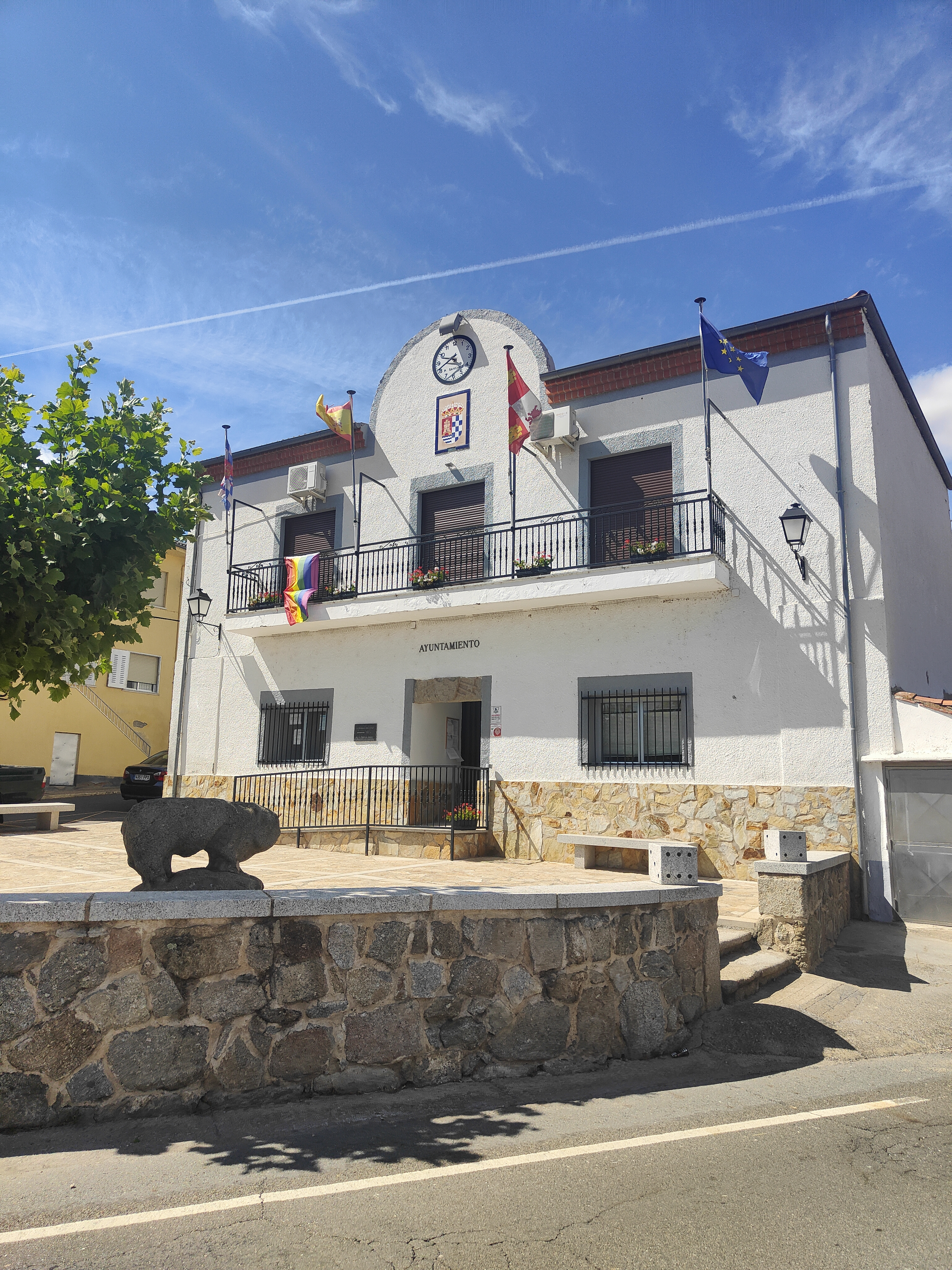
In the Plaza de los Dados, in front of the Town Hall, stands the Vettonian verraco.

Map of the pre-roman peoples of the Iberian peninsula before the Carthaginian conquest.

A remnant of the Vettonian people that can be found in Puente del Congosto is a verraco dating from that period. It is located in the Plaza de los Dados, opposite the Town Hall. The verracos are zoomorphic stone sculptures that commonly depict pigs, wild boars, and bulls. There are over 420 of this sculptures among Spain and Portugal. Their exact meaning remains uncertain, although the main theories suggest they may have served as territorial markers or as mystical or religious symbols of protection.^{[6]}

Romanization

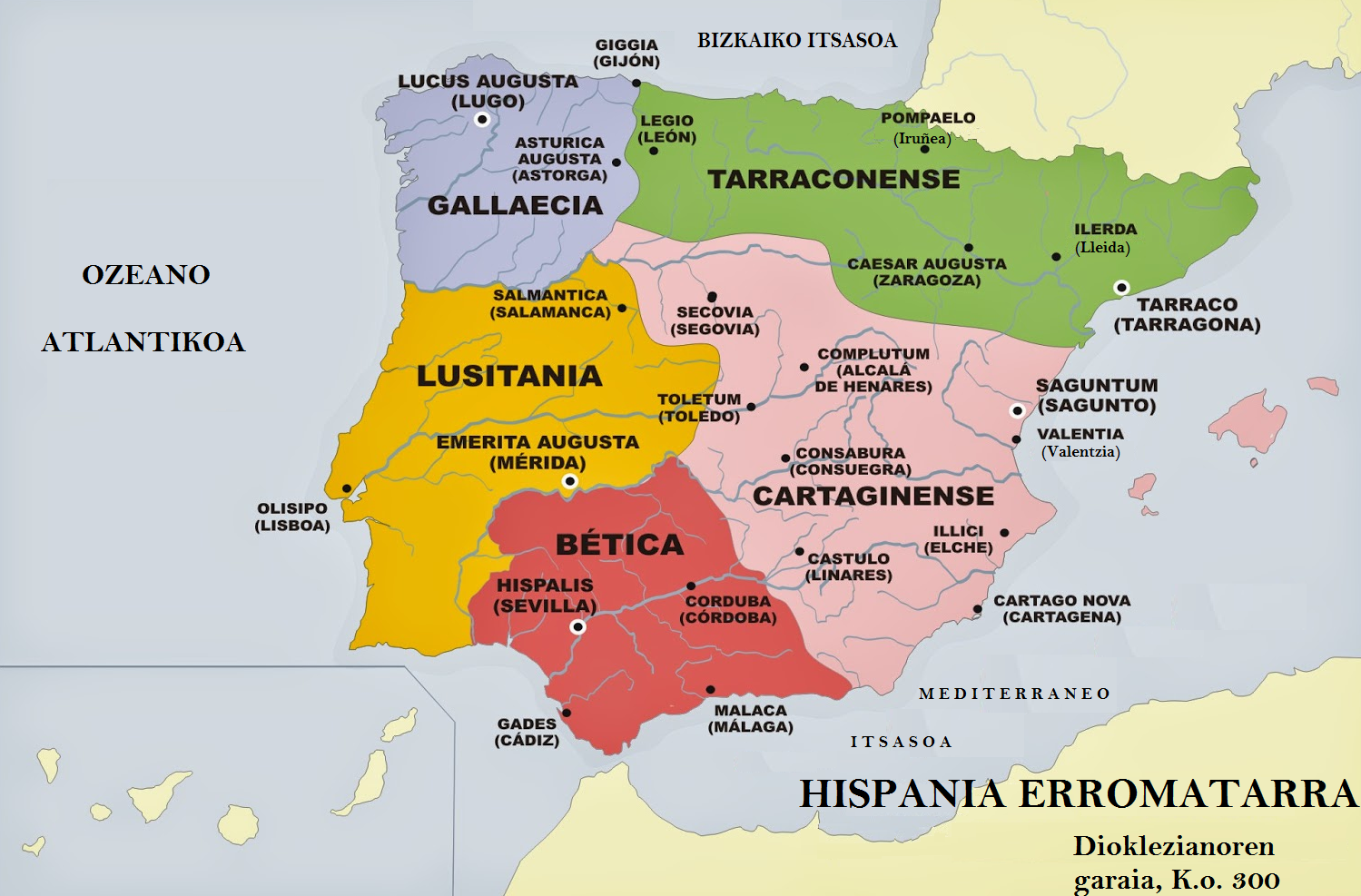
Map of the administrative divisions of the Roman Province of Hispania.

The victory of Rome in the Second Punic War started the Romanization, the process by which Roman or Latin culture was introduced into the Iberian Peninsula during the period of Roman rule.

From the initial Roman conquest of Hispania, the region would remain a Roman province for the next 600 years, although some territories of the Iberian Peninsula took nearly two more centuries to come fully under Roman control. The municipality of Puente del Congosto also preserves vestiges that bear witness to this historical period.

Medieval Age

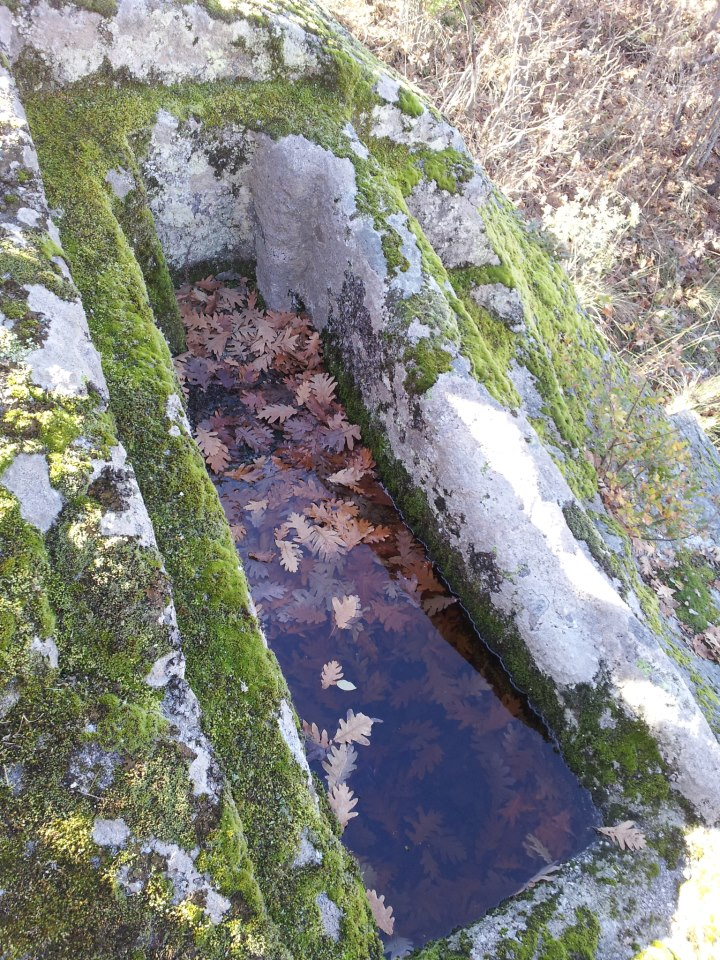
Visigothic tomb in Santibáñez de la Sierra (province of Salamanca).

After the Fall of the Roman Empire, various Germanic peoples—namely the Vandals, Suebi, and Alans—crossed the Pyrenees and settled in different regions of Hispania. In the territory surrounding what would later become the village of Puente del Congosto, as in the rest of Vettonia, the Alans established their control devastating the lands of Vettonia and Lusitania.

The Alan regime was short-lived, lasting only from 411 to 418, when they were annihilated by King Wallia, who had entered into a treaty with Emperor Honorius to expel the barbarian peoples that had invaded Hispania. The Visigothic took control of the Iberian Peninsula after the Fall of the Roman Empire, Traces of this Germanic culture can still be found in the neighboring towns to this locality, in instance in the "Moor Tomb" (despite the popular name, it is actually a visigothic tomb) located in Bercimuelle.

In the year 711, the Muslim invasion of the Iberian Peninsula took place, consequently, this land was invaded by Muslims and semi-depopulated from the 8th century until its recovery during the Reconquista, in this case after the conquest of Ávila by the Christian forces. The territory now occupied by the municipality of Puente del Congosto was located within the area known as the “tierra de nadie” (“no man's land”) or "Desierto del Duero" ("Desert of the Douro"), a vast geographical region situated between the Central System and the Cantabrian Mountains that remained largely semi-depopulated during this period.

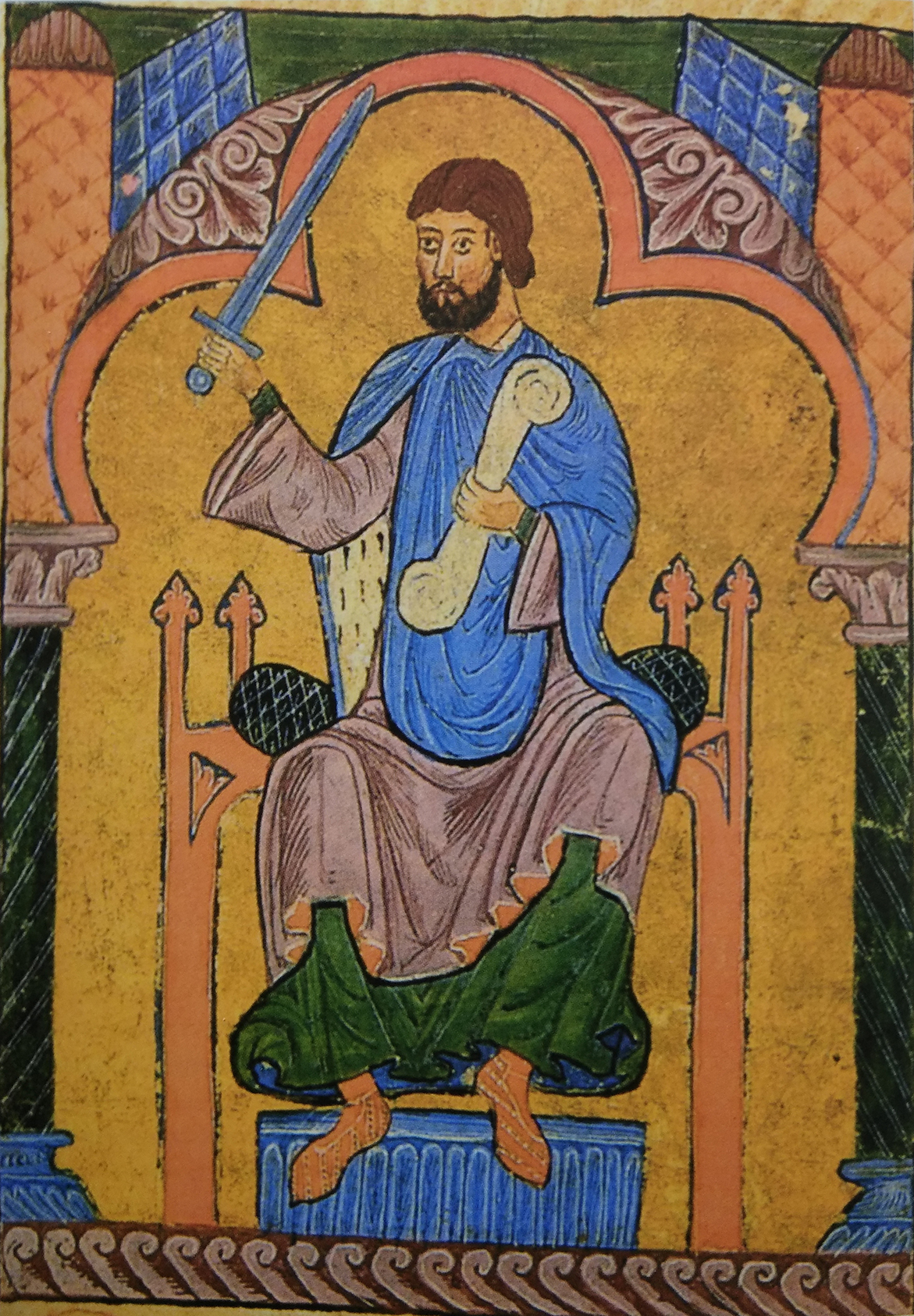
Raymond of Burgundy, husband of Urraca I of León and Castile.

The repopulation of Salamanca was undertaken by the French nobleman Raymond of Burgundy (Raimundo de Borgoña) husband of the queen Urraca I of León and Castile, who played a key role in the Christian reorganization of the territories south of the Douro River during the early stages of the Reconquista. Raymond led the resettlement of the region with people from northern Castile and Galicia, contributing to the demographic and political consolidation of the area. This process was part of a broader strategy to secure and stabilize the frontier zones that had remained depopulated following the Muslim invasion of the 8th century and the subsequent centuries of conflict.

The emergence of the town of Puente del Congosto dates back to the 11th century. From the very beginning, these lands were incorporated into the alfoz of Ávila.

The Mesta was officially established in 1273 by King Alfonso X, known as 'the Wise', who brought together the shepherds of León and Castile into a guild-like organization to regulate transhumance and safeguard their interests. The Mesta played a pivotal role in the economic development of Castile, particularly through the wool trade, which became one of the most valuable commodities of the period. Merino wool, bred in Castile at that period, was renowned for its exceptional softness and fineness, with longer and more durable fibers than other European wools—making it ideal for producing high-quality cloth which was sold to the major textile centers of Flanders, Italy, and England.

In 1442, Gil González Dávila, a knight from Ávila, was granted royal favor by King Henry III in recognition of his longstanding loyalty and distinguished service to the Crown. As a consequence, Puente del Congosto was detached from the jurisdiction of Ávila and elevated to the rank of villa, acquiring its own municipal status (this legally recognized settlement also granted special privileges by the Crown. These privileges often included, apart from self-governance, exemption from certain taxes, and the right to hold markets or fairs), and subsequently granted to him as a lordship, together with the nearby village of Cespedosa de Tormes.

Gil González was responsible for initiating the construction of the fortress that still stands today, a work that was later brought to completion by his widow, Doña Aldonza de Guzmán.

Following his death in 1479 a bitter rivalry over inheritance of his domains arose between his sons, Juan Dávila and Luis de Guzmán. Their conflict centered particularly on the lordship of Congosto, a territory of considerable value due to the generous income el portazgo (the toll demanded by the lord to cross the bridge) provided.

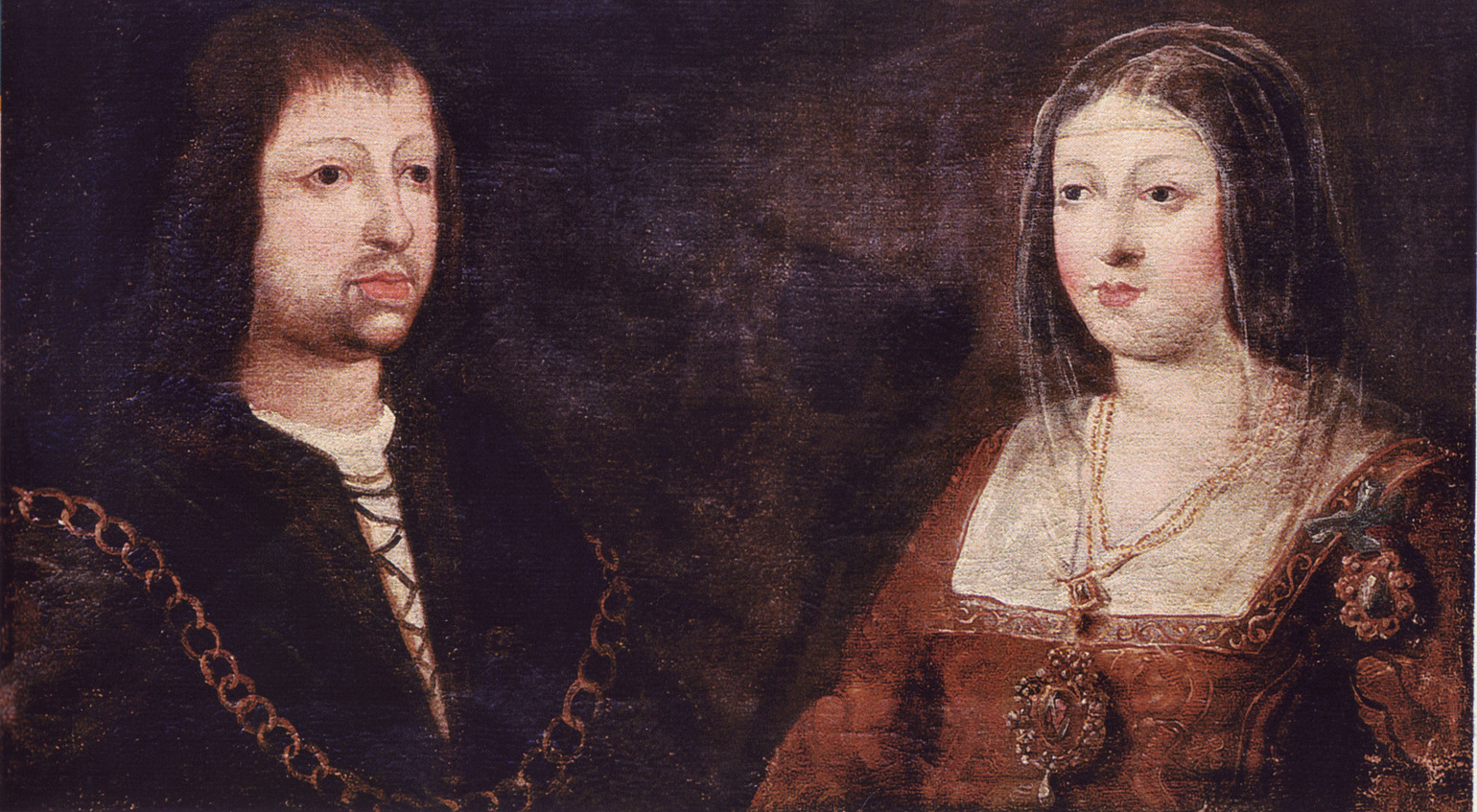
Isabella of Castile and Ferdinand II of Aragon, the Catholic Monarchs.

The Catholic Monarchs were compelled to intervene and ultimately decreed that Juan Dávila would retain control over Cespedosa, while the town and fortress of El Congosto were granted to Luis de Guzmán, commander of the Military Order of Calatrava. Guzmán died in 1495 without heirs, and as a result, all his possessions devolved to the order, whose lifetime administration had been secured by the Catholic Monarchs only a few years earlier.

It is believed that Queen Isabella I spent the night in the castle, and that Emperor Charles V also stayed there on his way to Yuste.

==== Death of Prince Juan of Asturias ====
The Castle of the Dávila family stands as a silent witness to one of the most poignant episodes in the dynastic history of Spain. On October 4, 1497, the reign of the Catholic Monarchs was marked by a deeply personal tragedy: the premature death of their only son, Prince John of Asturias, in Salamanca.

Over the centuries, a local legend has taken root, claiming that Queen Isabella, upon learning of her son's grave condition while in Valencia de Alcántara, attempted to reach Salamanca to be by his side. According to this tradition, she stopped for the night at the fortress of Puente del Congosto, where she is said to have received the devastating news of his death.

However, historian Carlos Sánchez offers a different interpretation. He argues that Queen Isabella never set foot in Puente del Congosto during those days. Instead, it was Margaret of Austria—Archduchess of Austria and Princess of Asturias, wife of Prince John—and the Queen's eldest daughter, also named Isabella, Infanta of Castile and future Queen of Portugal, who were present in the village.

Faced with the Prince's deteriorating health, the Catholic Monarchs decided to separate Margaret from her husband due to her pregnancy, fearing that any contagion might endanger the unborn child. Puente del Congosto was chosen as her temporary refuge for two reasons: its proximity to Salamanca and the presence of Pedro de Torres, the Prince's second secretary and trusted governor of the fortress.

The Monarchs also deemed it appropriate for their daughter, Infanta Isabella, to travel from Extremadura—where she was preparing for her marriage to the King of Portugal—to Puente del Congosto, in order to offer comfort to her sister-in-law during those anxious hours.

Both princesses arrived in the village on October 2 and spent the night within the castle's semicircular tower. There, they shared moments of deep sorrow and concern. Margaret informed Isabella of her husband's worsening condition, while Isabella did her utmost to console the young Archduchess.

They were received with the dignity befitting their rank by Pedro de Torres and the castle's attendants. On the morning of October 3, Infanta Isabella reluctantly departed for Extremadura, though it is believed she would have preferred to continue on to Salamanca to be with her brother. Margaret remained at the fortress for another day, and it was there, on October 4, that she was informed of her husband's death, reportedly from tuberculosis.

The presence of these royal figures left a lasting impression on the local population. So much so, that for over five centuries, the event has been preserved through oral tradition. Yet, as often happens, the story became distorted: popular memory replaced the Archduchess and the Infanta with Queen Isabella herself, perhaps out of a desire to associate the village with such an illustrious figure. This reinterpretation, while historically inaccurate according to Sánchez's research, reflects the community's longing to be part of a momentous chapter in Spain's royal history.

=== Modern Age ===
In the name of the monarchs, the Calatravan knight Pedro de Torres was appointed governor of the town, and it fell to him to defend the fortress against the assaults of the Castilian comuneros. In 1518, his son Antonio de Torres obtained lordship over the seigneurial estate. In 1539, Emperor Charles V detached the town of El Congosto from the Order of Calatrava and granted it to Fernando Álvarez de Toledo, the Grand Duke of Alba, in order to raise funds to finance his costly military campaigns against the Ottomans. From that moment on, the town became linked to the Ducal House of Alba de Tormes.

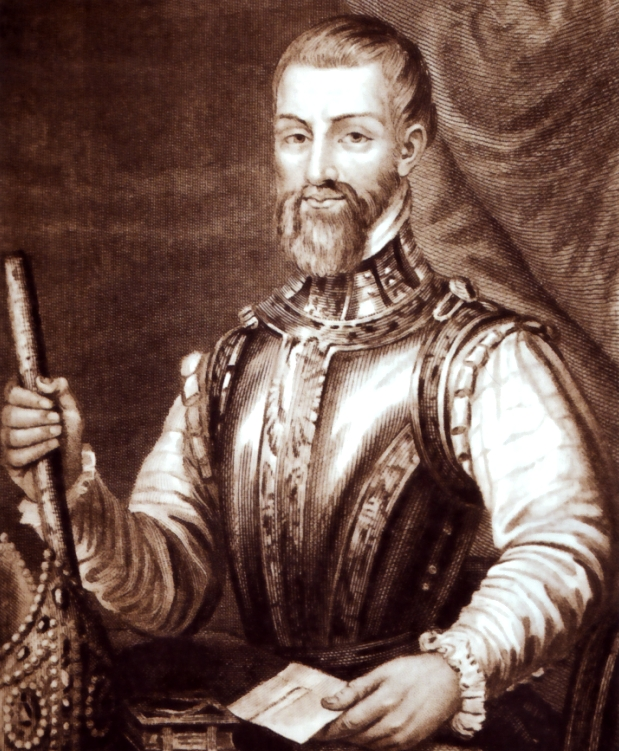
Pedro de la Gasca, born in Navarregadilla, was raised in the Castle of Dávila, in Puente del Congosto.

Pedro de la Gasca, the pacifier of Peru, was raised in the Castle of the Dávila family. In recognition of this, a commemorative plaque was placed on the wall of the castle in his honor. He was sent by Emperor Charles V as president of the Royal Audiencia of Lima, endowed with extraordinary powers to resolve the conflict triggered by the rebellion of Gonzalo Pizarro, who opposed the "New Laws" that sought to curb the abuses committed by the encomenderos. Without an army or military resources, La Gasca relied on his diplomatic skill to persuade Pizarro's followers to switch sides.

The successive Dukes of Alba appointed governors to oversee the lordship of El Congosto, who resided in the castle until the 17th century. However, due to the deteriorating living conditions of the fortress and the strategic need to centralize the economic administration of the duchy's extensive patrimonial estates, the governance of the lordship was transferred to Alba de Tormes, the administrative heart of the Ducal House. From that point onward, the fortress was left uninhabited.

=== Since 1800 ===
Fusilamientos del 3 de mayo, Francisco de Goya (1814). French troops were violent to Spaniards and destroyed lots of buildings in Spain during its invasion.

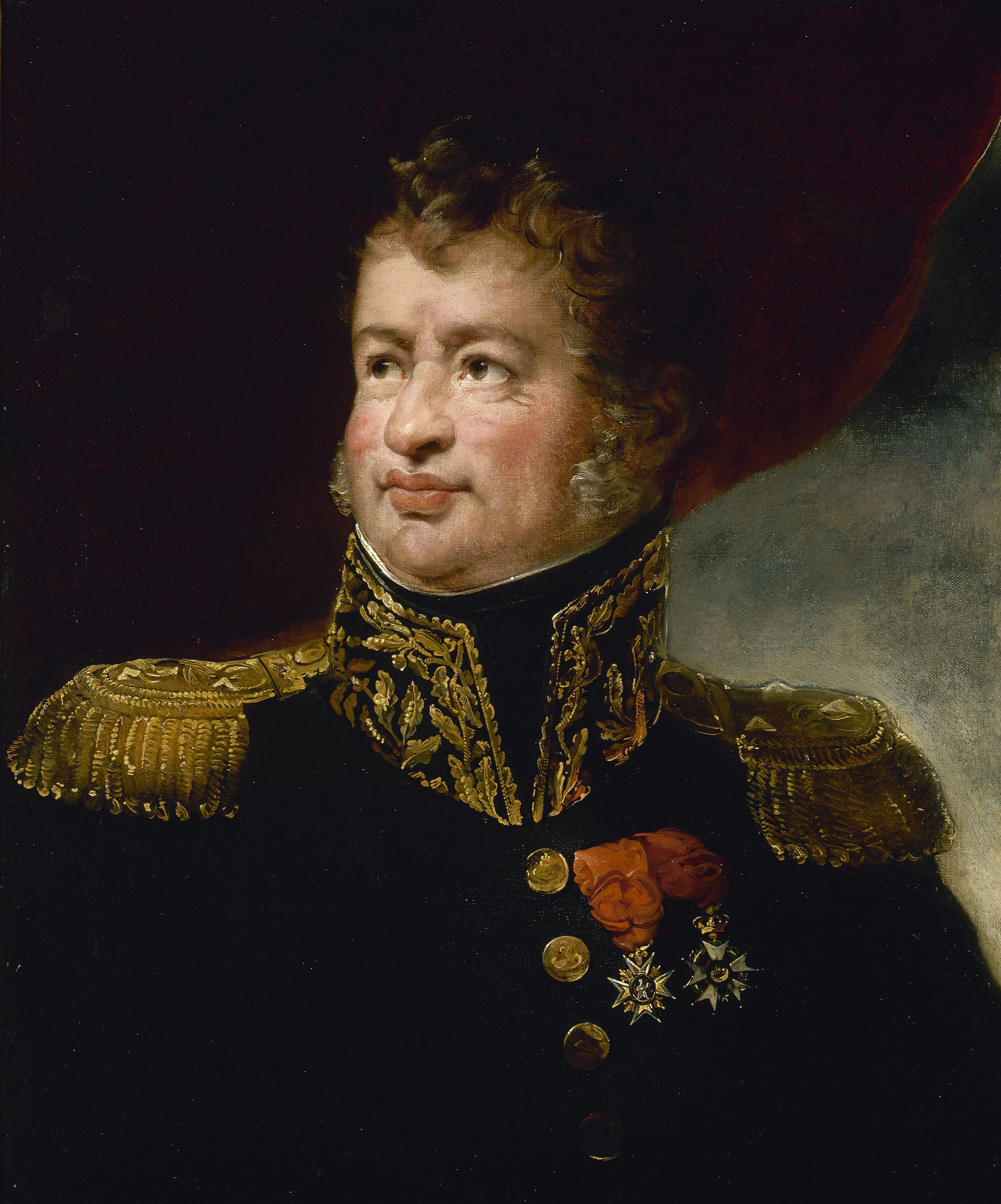
Léopold Joseph Sigisbert Hugo, a general in Napoleon’s army, was responsible for asserting control over the provinces of Ávila, Segovia, Soria, and Guadalajara. He stationed a detachment at the Castle of Dávila. He was also the father of Victor Hugo, the celebrated author of Les Misérables.

The castle suffered its greatest damage between 1809 and 1813, during the Peninsular War, when it housed a detachment of French troops known as the Royal Extranjero, part of the division commanded by the Napoleonic general Léopold Joseph Sigisbert Hugo, father of the renowned writer Victor Hugo. Around that time, the liberal Cortes of Cádiz abolished all forms of lordship in Spain. Nevertheless, the Ducal House of Alba retained ownership of numerous rural estates in the town, which it gradually sold off, along with the castle and the feudal right of pontazgo.

Spanish administrate división after Javier de Burgos law in 1833. Puente del Congosto became part of the province of Salamanca.

During this period, the Hermitage of the Order—where the annual romería is held—was also severely damaged by Napoleonic troops.

In 1833, after the new territorial division of Javier de Burgos, the village of Puente del Congosto became part of the province of Salamanca, being part of the Leonese Region.

== Site of Cultural Interest ==
In Spain, Bien de Interés Cultural (BIC) is a legal designation granted to assets of exceptional historical, artistic, architectural, archaeological, or ethnographic value. This status is regulated under Spanish heritage law, specifically the Ley 16/1985 del Patrimonio Histórico Español, and it represents the highest level of protection for cultural heritage within the country.

The designation can apply to both tangible and intangible heritage, including monuments, historic gardens, archaeological sites, traditional practices, and even urban ensembles. Once declared a BIC, the asset is subject to strict conservation measures, and any intervention—whether restoration, modification, or relocation—must comply with national and regional heritage regulations.

The importance of the BIC designation lies in its role in safeguarding Spain's cultural legacy. It intended to ensure that culturally significant assets are preserved for the present and the future, promoting historical continuity, national identity, and public access to heritage. BIC status often facilitates funding for conservation projects.

Numerous cultures have passed through Puente del Congosto, and heritage laws protect some of its places.

=== Mount Berrueco ===
Because of its archaeological importance in its 12 millennia of history, it has been protected since 1931 as a BIC.

=== The Castle of the Dávila family and the fortified bridge over the River Tormes ===
In October 2019 the Regional Government of Castile and León approved the designation of the Castle of the Dávila family and the fortified bridge over the River Tormes, located in Puente del Congosto (Salamanca), as a Bien de Interés Cultural (BIC) under the category of Historic Ensemble. Furthermore, a protected area has been defined to prevent potential degradation of the historical value of the castle, the bridge, and their physical environment.

=== Art of dry stone construction, knowledge and techniques ===
Dry stone construction is the traditional craft of assembling stone structures without the use of mortar or binding agents. Widely practised across Europe, it demands a deep grasp of geometric principles and physical forces, along with the ability to work skillfully with natural stone. The technique relies on the precise placement and fitting of stones to create durable, stable forms that harmonize with the surrounding landscape and respond to local environmental conditions.The UNESCO Committee for the Safeguarding of Intangible Cultural Heritage stated that "dry stone walls play an essential role in preventing landslides, floods, and avalanches."

== Festivities ==
Reyes Magos

It is customary to organize a parade in which the Three Wise Men travel through the town giving presents to the local children the day before Epiphany. This celebration is known as the Cabalgata de Reyes.

Las Águedas

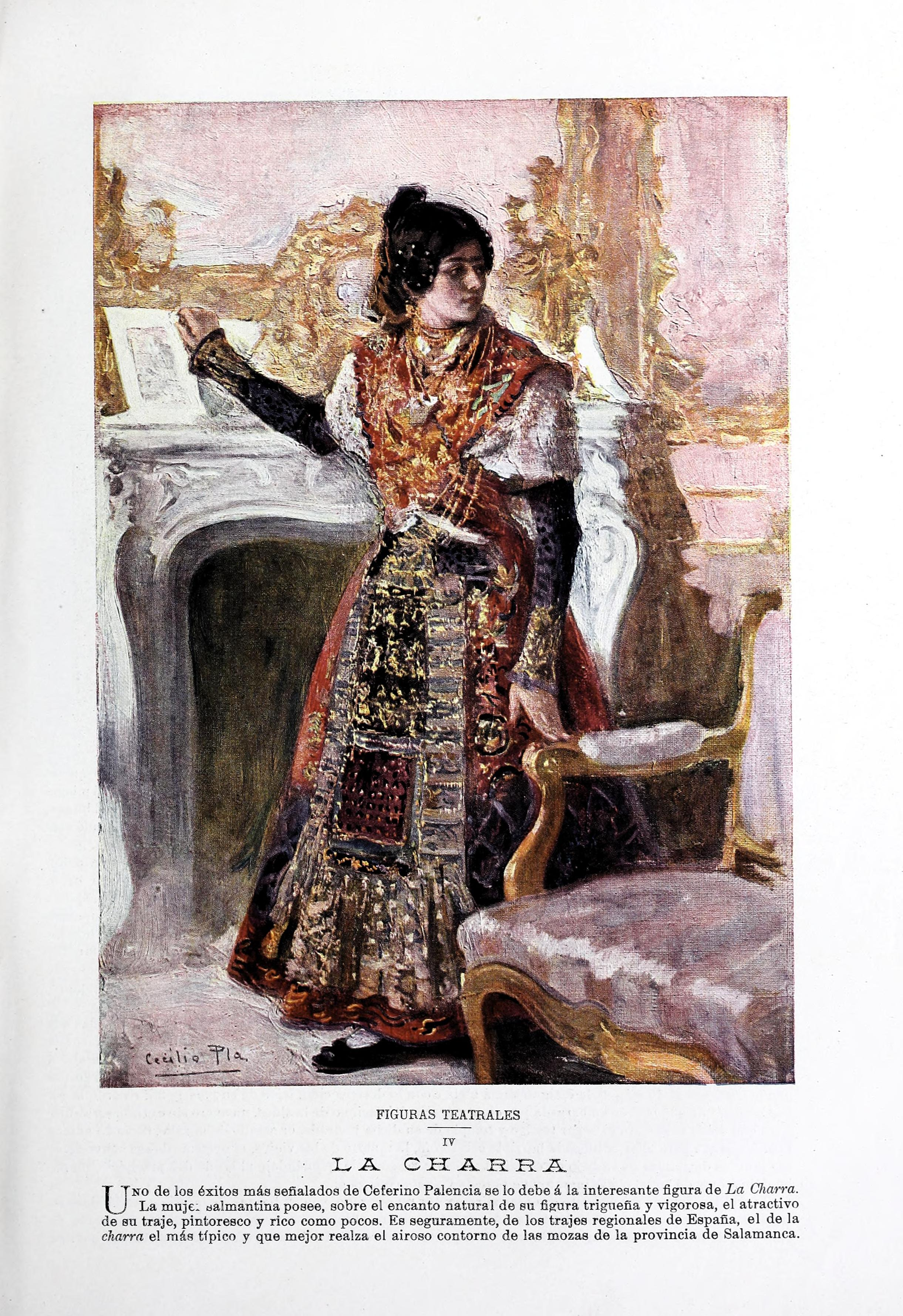
This is an example of a typical attire from the province of Salamanca. There are multiple types of attire depending on the comarca or villages.

This is a traditional festivity every February 5 in which women become the central figures of the day, symbolically taking control of the town for one day. It is a celebration that takes place in Castile and León and surrounding regions. This day, women take part in devotional acts dedicated to Saint Agatha, wear traditional attire during the festive events, and engage in a symbolic reversal of roles of men and women.

In Puente del Congosto an Agueda Mayor is elected each year, who takes the Mayor Mace from the mayor of the town before a mass in honor of the Saint. Tradition also dictates that las aguedas (the followers of this tradition) go to the road that spans the New Bridge to offer Perrunillas to every person they see and ask them for money to pay for the celebration. After that the female followers of the tradition celebrate a fest of sisterhood with the music of a traditional Dulzainero.

El Entierro de la Sardina

The Entierro de la Sardina (Burial of the Sardine) is a traditional Spanish festivity held on Ash Wednesday, marking the end of the Carnival season and the beginning of Lent. This ritual, both satirical and symbolic, consists of a mock funeral procession in which a sardine—often represented by an effigy—is ceremonially 'buried' or burned. The event parodies official ceremonies and social conventions, serving as a collective catharsis before the austerity of Lent.

Rooted in 18th-century popular culture, the celebration blends elements of carnival excess, political satire, and folkloric theatre. Participants often dress in mourning attire, exaggerating the gestures and language of grief, while musicians and performers accompany the procession with irreverent humor.

La Romería de la Virgen de la Orden

The venerated image of Nuestra Señora de la Orden is borne in procession from the parish church to a nearby pastoral setting adjacent to the hermitage, where a liturgical celebration is held in the open air. Following the mass, families share a meal beneath a holm oak, enlivened by the music of dulzaineros.

Fiestas Patronales: Nuestra Señora de la Asunción y San Roque

In the days of the 15th and the 16th of August, this celebration take place to honor the patrons of the Village: Saint Roch and Our Lady of the Assumption.

These celebrations are the most important in the locality. Festive days unfold throughout the week. Nighttime concerts and mobile discotheques are traditionally held. The festivities begin with the "Pregón de los Mayordomos". The mayordomos represent, for two-year terms, the Hermandad de San Roque—a religious association with over 150 years of history that holds responsibilities related to the town's liturgical life.

Calbotes

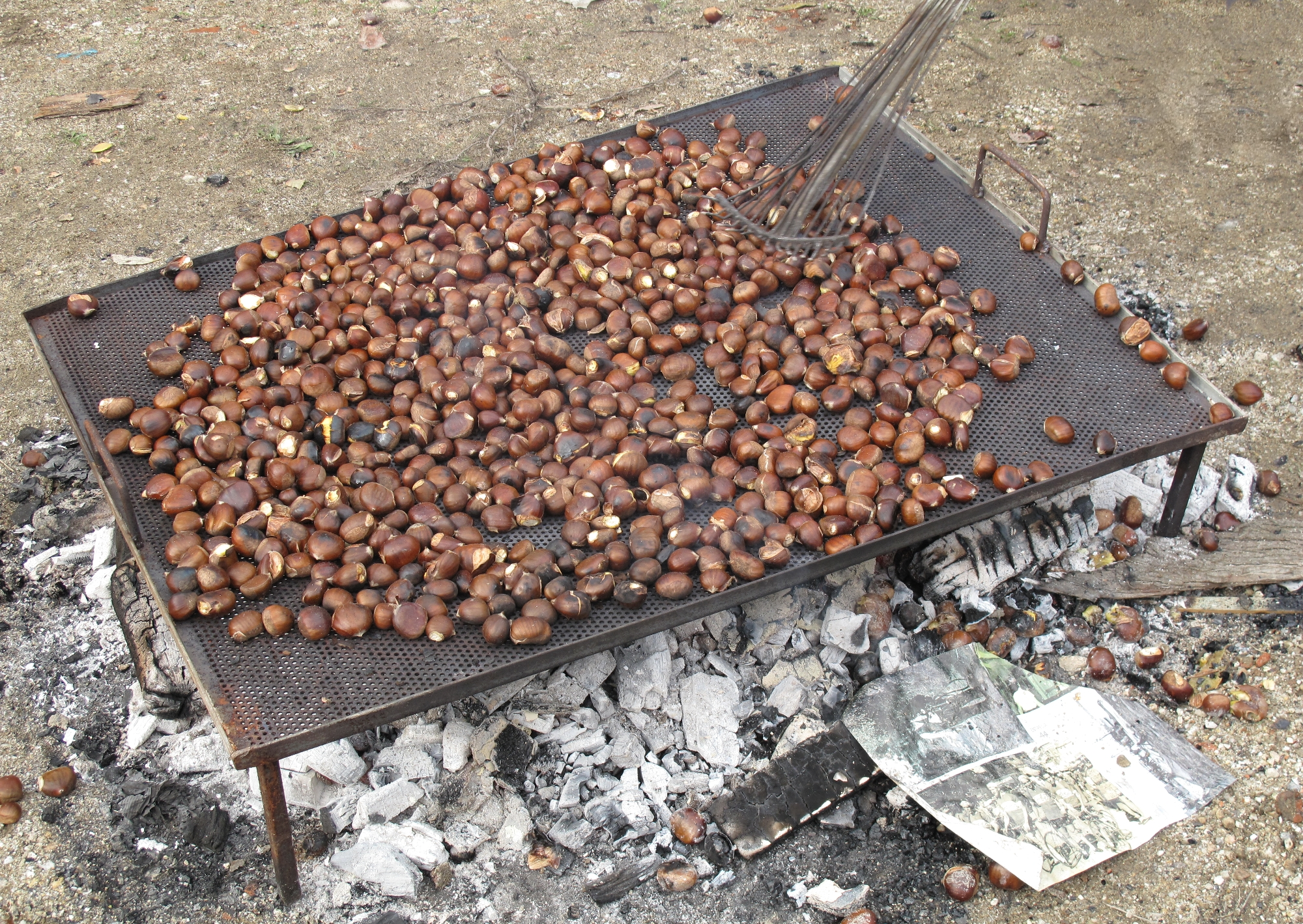
Roasted chestnut.

The last weekend of October a party is held related to the celebration of Los Santos in which roasted chestnuts are eaten. "The calbote is a tradition of medieval and Christian origin, which in turn derives from Samhain, or the 'end of summer', celebrated by Celtic peoples and later absorbed by the Romans, who transmitted it to Christianity". It has become mixed with the celebration of Halloween.

La Matanza Popular

In December the traditional Matanza ("slaughter") is celebrated, a very ancient tradition based on the slaughter of the pig, which provided food for families throughout the year. Nowadays the pig's meat is sold and prizes are auctioned. It is held in December, during the Constitution Day long weekend, and forms part of the Traditional Slaughter Festival (Fiesta de la Matanza Tradicional) which the Provincial Council of Salamanca organizes annually in various municipalities across the province.

== Gallery ==
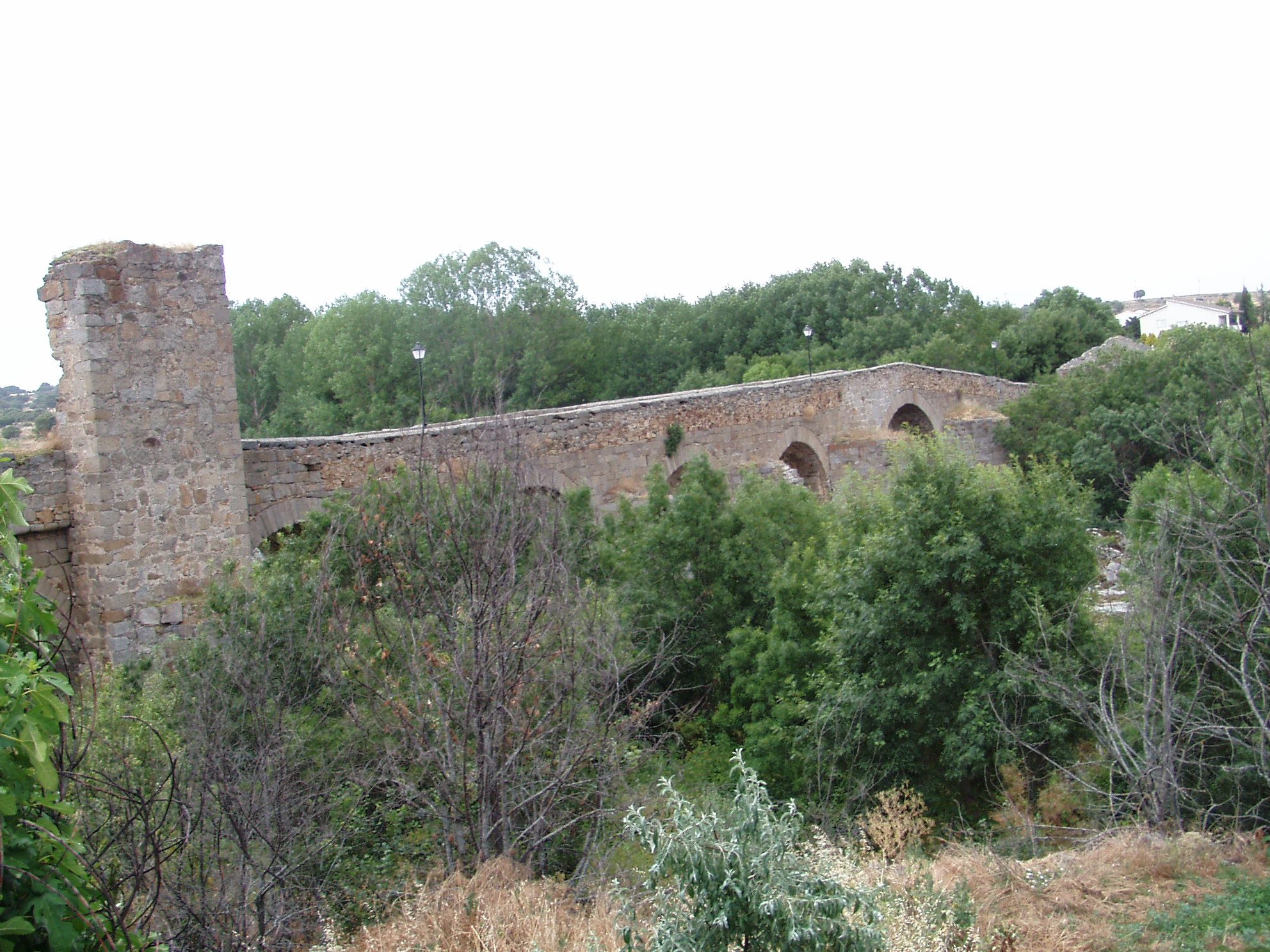
The ruins of the medieval bridge which gave the place its name

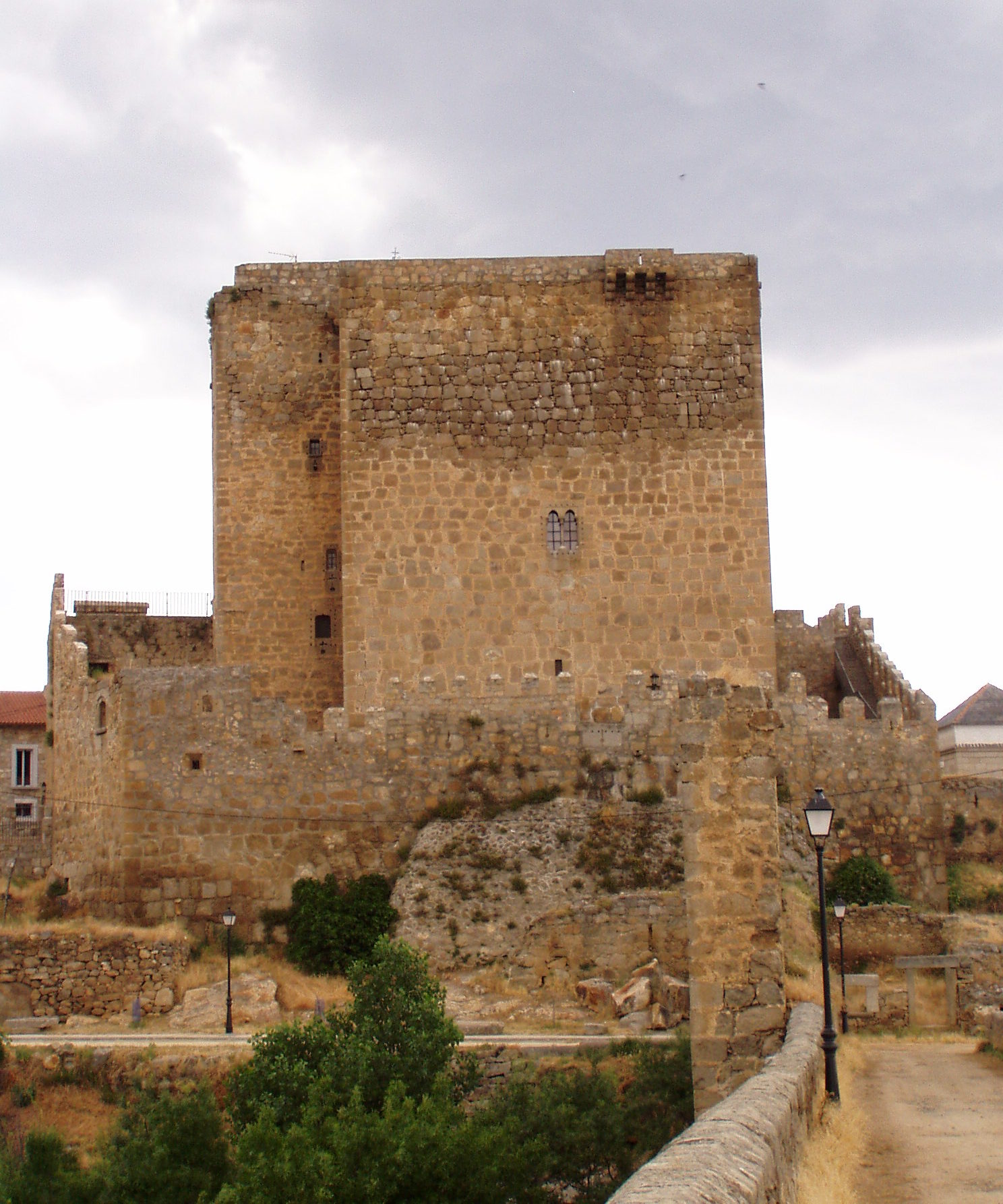
The medieval castle

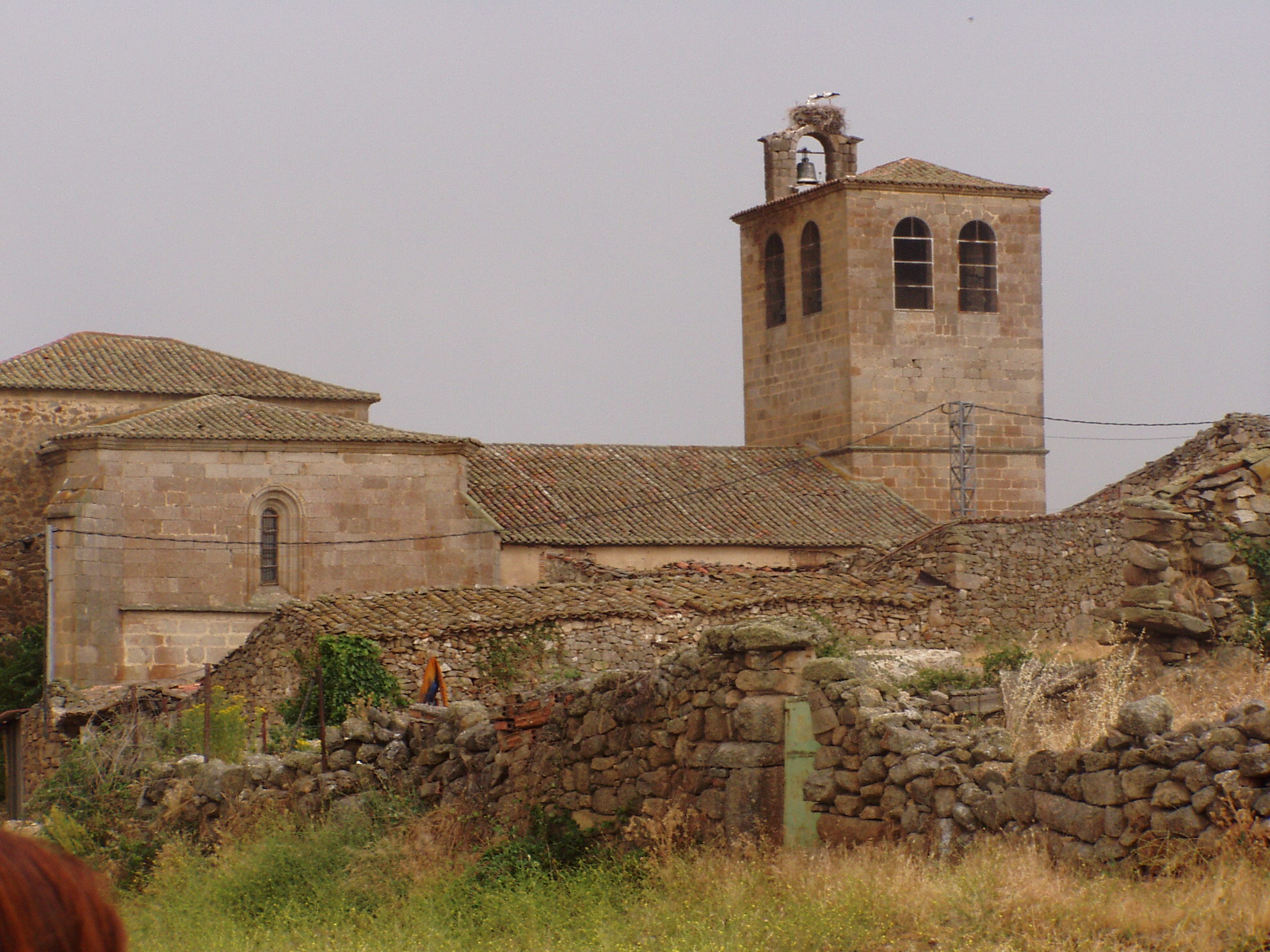
Our Lady of the Assumption Church
