= Roman bridge of Salamanca =

Extant Roman Bridge in Spain

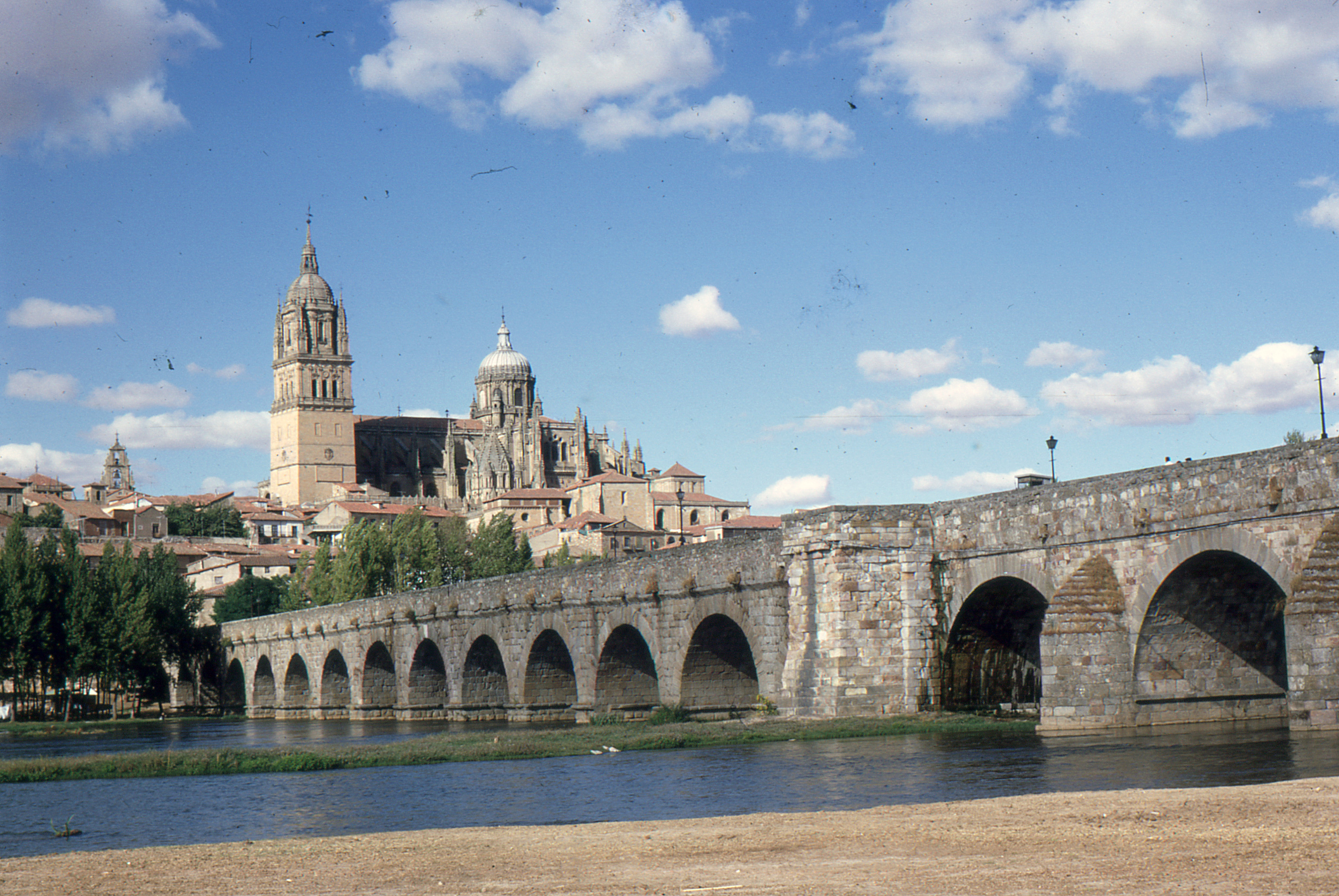
- Coordinates: 40°57′28″N 5°40′13″W
- Carries: Pedestrians
- Crosses: River Tormes
- Locale: Salamanca, Spain

Characteristics
- Total length: 176 metres (577 ft)
- Width: 3.70 metres (12.1 ft)

History
- Opened: approximately 1st century CE
- Closed: 1973 to vehicular traffic

Location
- Interactive map of Roman bridge of Salamanca

The Roman bridge of Salamanca (Spanish: Puente romano de Salamanca), also known as Puente Mayor del Tormes and as Puente Prinçipal (main bridge), is a Roman bridge crossing the Tormes River in the city of Salamanca, Castile and León, Spain. The bridge originally dates to the period of Roman occupation of the Iberian Peninsula, being built between 27BCE and 79CE and gave access to the southern part of the city. The bridge is part of the historic road known as the Vía de la Plata, passing between Mérida and Astorga. The bridge has had strategic, economic and cultural value to the region. The bridge has been rebuilt a number of times since its original construction, with the section on the right bank, to the city of Salamanca, retaining the majority of the original Roman construction.

The Roman bridge of Salamanca has long had symbolic value to the city, including being a part of the city's coat of arms (along with its stone bull-verraco). Historic recognition includes being named an Artistic Historic Monument on 3 June 1931, and Bien de Interés Cultural in 1998. The bridge was the primary thoroughfare into the city until the beginning of 20th century. The bridge remained heavily used until 1973 when it became exclusively a pedestrian bridge, as other vehicular bridges in Salamanca were constructed.

The bridge consists of two parts separated by a central fortification: the old bridge which is of Roman origin and carries the bridge into the city, and the new bridge. Of the twenty-six arches supporting the structure, the first fifteen date from Roman times. The stone used in its construction is from different sources. The stone in the original Roman bridge area is from the granite quarries of Los Santos (Béjar), while the remainder of the stone comes from the area of Ledesma.

The bridge has been restored on numerous occasions over the centuries and has survived several proposals for demolition. Many of the restorations have been poorly documented, leaving uncertain the details of the reconstruction methods and even the precise years of reconstruction. The exact date of the original construction of the bridge is not exactly known, although its construction was mandated by Emperors Augustus (27BCE - 14CE) and Vespasian (69BCE - 79CE).

== History ==
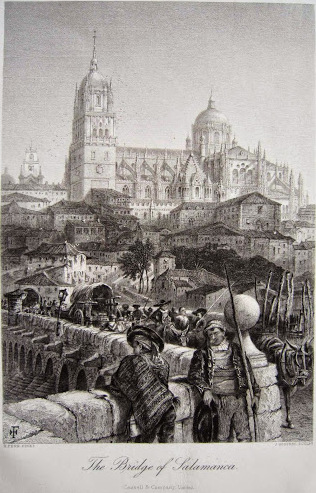
Roman Bridge of Salamanca in 1878 as depicted by artist Harry Fenn.

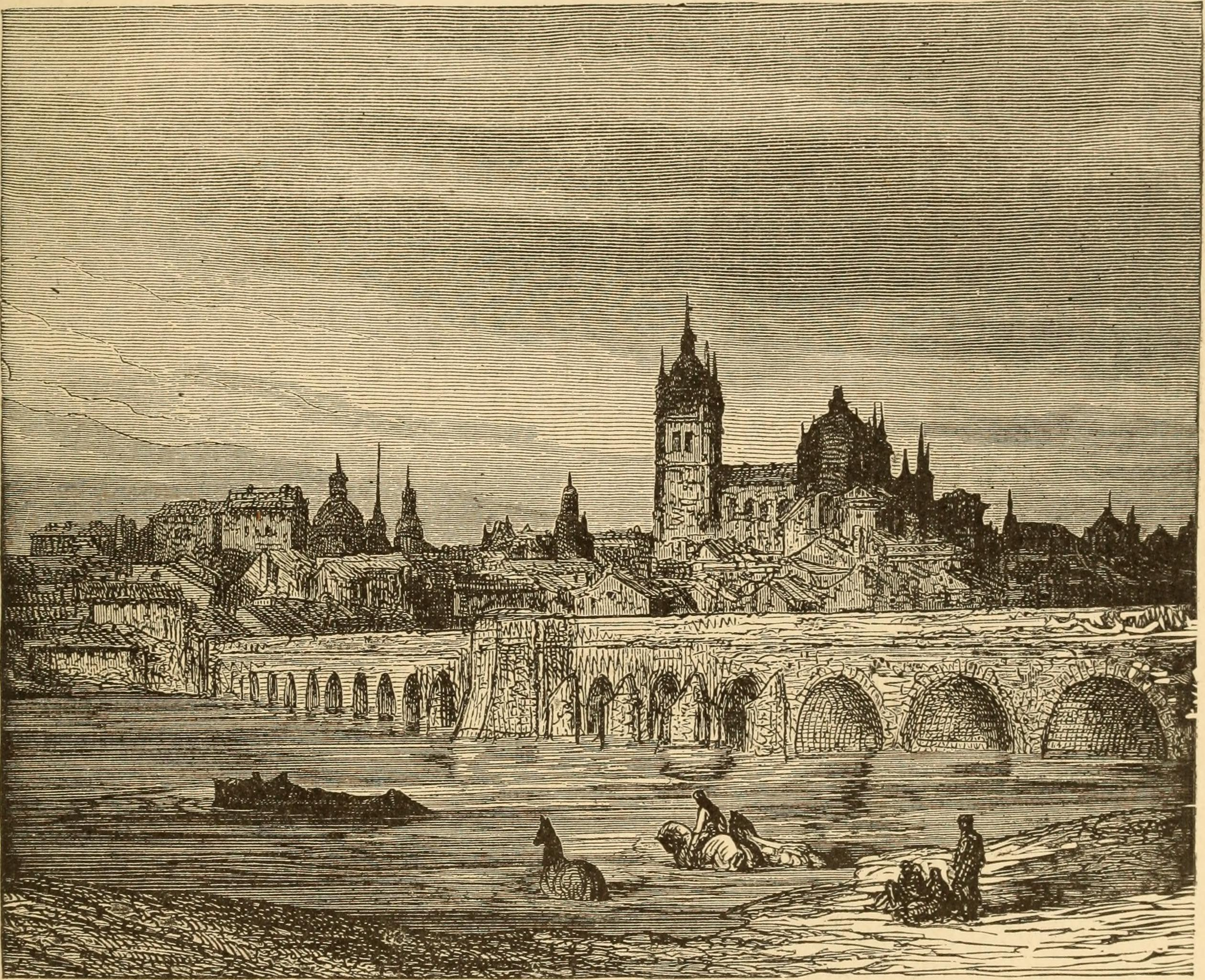
Roman bridge of Salamanca in 1889 as depicted by travel writer Frederick A. Ober.

The history of the Roman bridge of Salamanca parallels the history of the city of Salamanca. The bridge is among the city's most visible landmarks, together with the New Cathedral of Salamanca, the Old Cathedral of Salamanca, the La Clerecía, Plaza Mayor, and the Casa de las Conchas. When constructed in the 1st century, its purpose was to provide a crossing of the Tormes River for travelers on the Vía de la Plata linking Mérida and Astorga (previously known as Iter ab Emerita Asturicam).

=== Legends ===
The history of the Roman bridge of Salamanca is also associated with legends, including that the bridge was initially constructed by the mythical hero Hercules and later rebuilt by the Roman Emperor Trajan. Historian Gil González Dávila stated in 1606 that the basis for the legends about Trajan as the builder resulted from a stone marker found nearby. However, this stone marker actually pertained to repairs made on the Vía de la Plata Roman road. In 1767, a box containing a medal honoring Hercules was unearthed within the first arcade of the bridge. This discovery, documented by the Salamanca historian Bernardo Dorado in his 18th century work Compendio Histórico de la Ciudad de Salamanca, further added to local legends about the bridge.

=== Roman times ===
The Roman road known as the Via de la Plata passed through Salamanca, necessitating the construction of a bridge near the city. The exact date of construction is unknown, with varying estimates of construction dating from a few years prior to the start of the Common Era to early in the second century CE. The Via de la Plata was substantially complete by the year 19 BCE, and it is possible the bridge was completed by then. The Greek geographer Strabo (III, 4, 20) showed that Roman troops were widely distributed in Hispania by that time, from Astorga, León to Lusitania.

However, ambiguity exists in the actual completion date of the bridge, in part because the construction of the Via de la Plata evolved during Roman times because of changing military and economic needs. Some historians place completion of the bridge during the time of Emperor Nero (mid-first century CE), while others date it from the time of Trajan and Hadrian, placing it in the early second century CE). Some of these claims are based on the structural similarity of the bridge to the Aqueduct of Segovia) while other claims are based on epigraphic studies of various milestones along the Via de la Plata.

Regarding the economic significance of the Roman bridge of Salamanca, at the time that Emperor Augustus conducted his second military campaign in Hispania between 16 and 13 BCE, settlements were appearing along the roads, especially for purposes of transporting ore. This led to infrastructure needs to facilitate communication and transport. Also, by the beginning of the first century CE, exploitation of the gold mines of Las Cavenes (in El Cabaco) had started. Infrastructure construction continued well into the first century CE as the Flavian dynasty dominated the northern portion of the Iberian peninsula. It is possible that the bridge did not originally consist only of stone but of a mixed construction with wood.

Little information is available on the role of the Roman bridge of Salamanca following the decline of the Roman Empire and the rise of the importance of tribes such as the Suebis, Vandals, Alans, and Visigoths in the region.

A landmark at the Roman bridge of Salamanca is the Verraco del Puente, which is a stone sculpture of a bull. The Verraco is located at the end of the bridge on the city center side of the bridge. Although the Verraco sculpture itself dates to the pre-Roman Vettones people, the first documented evidence of its placement at the bridge was from the 13th century. In 1606, the city historian, Gil González Dávila, pointed out that the Salamanca coat of arms featured a stone bull in the first quarter of the design.

=== Middle Ages to eighteenth century ===
Flooding from the Tormes River has long threatened the Roman bridge of Salamanca. Periodic floods have had destructive effects on the bridge, some that necessitated extensive reconstruction. For this reason, it is possible that the original Roman-constructed part of the bridge may have been lengthier than it is today, as these sections may have been flood-damaged before written record-keeping.

Despite the importance of the bridge for transportation and commerce within the Kingdom of León during the time of the Reconquista, written information about the bridge first appeared only in the 12th century. Control of the passage of people and goods, as well as the collection of the portazgo tax (toll fees), was carried out on the city side of the Roman bridge of Salamanca.

A major flood occurred in 1256, called Ríada de los Difuntos (English: Flood of the Dead). Accounts of this flood indicate that it left the southern part (southern side) of the bridge impassable. Around this time, extensive reconstruction of the bridge occurred that included eleven new arches, significantly extending the length of the bridge. It is unknown whether the new part of the bridge was built subsequent or previous to the actual Ríada de los Difuntos.

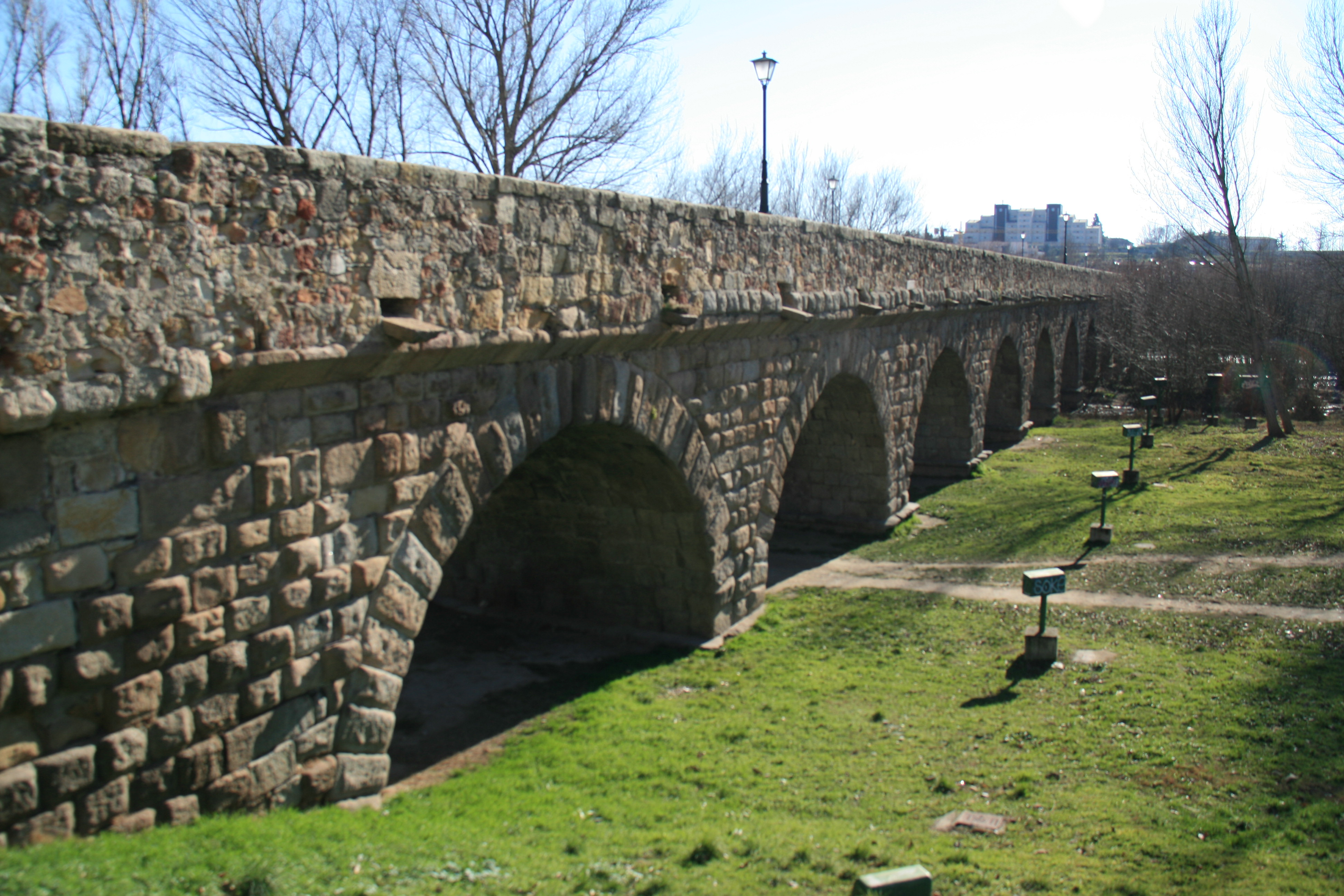
Arches of the old, Roman section of the bridge, on the city side of the bridge

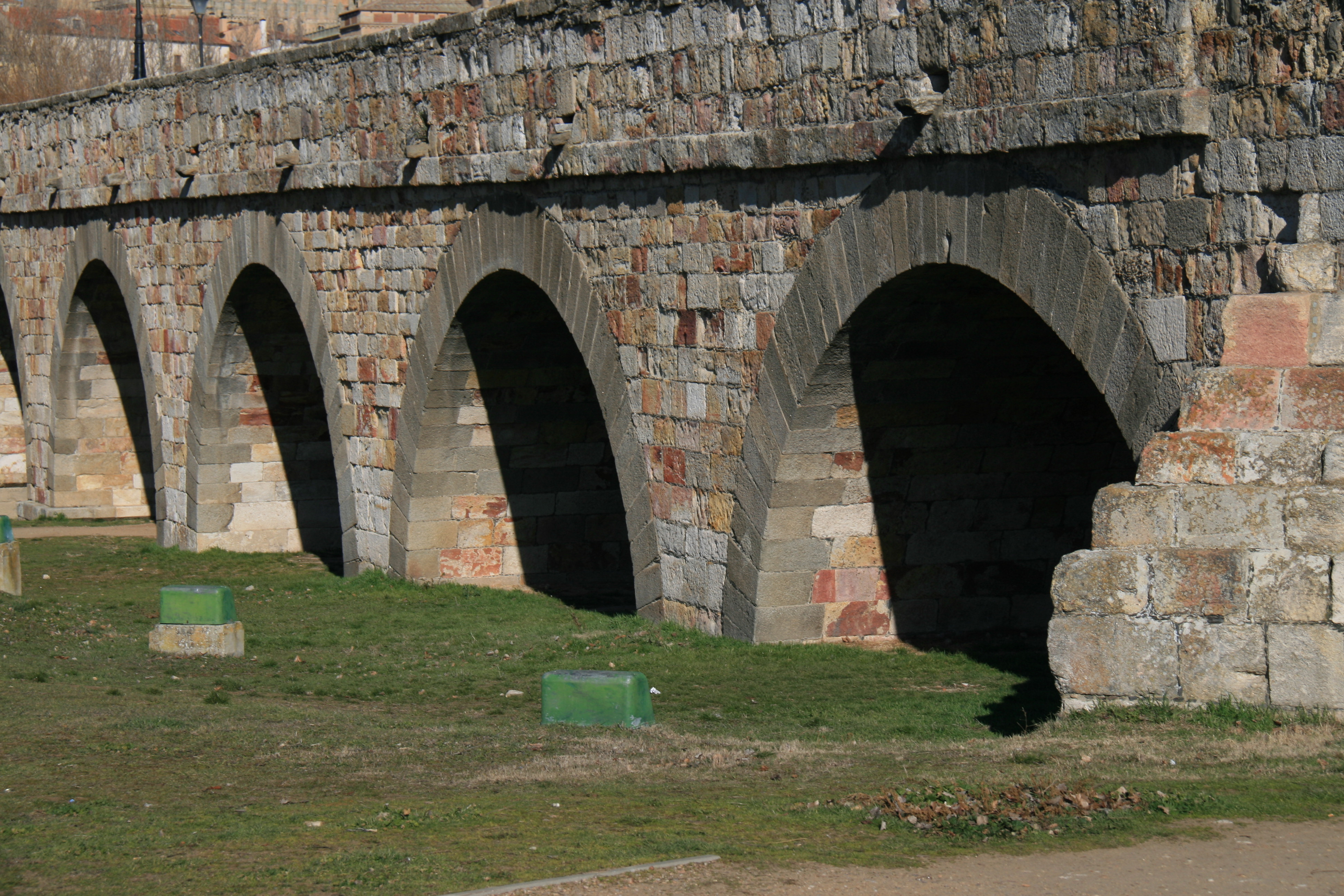
Arches of the bridge built in medieval times on the side of the river opposite the original city

Beginning in the late 15th century, the bridge was referred to for a significant period of time as the "Puente Prinçipal de la Ciudad de Salamanca" (English: Main Bridge of the City of Salamanca). Around that time, the bridge endured a flood of the Tormes River known as the "Avenida de Santa Bárbara" (3 December 1498). In the early-16th century, the Tormes River, as well as the Tagus River, was reputed to be among the most hazardous rivers in the Iberian Peninsula, due to its tendency to flood. In 1570, the traveller and artist Anton van den Wyngaerde completed an artistic depiction of the bridge and the city as seen from the arrabal (suburbs), indicating what the bridge looked like at that point in time. In 1626, the Flood of San Policarpo occurred, causing much destruction to the city and to two of the bridge's medieval arches. Gradually the other arches collapsed up to the point of the bridge's central tower, while the Roman section survived undamaged. In 1627, major repairs took place, as can be seen today in the two pillars at the entrance to the arrabal (suburban side). The central tower and the battlements were removed as part of the repairs, as is seen in the comparison to van den Wyngaerde's painting.

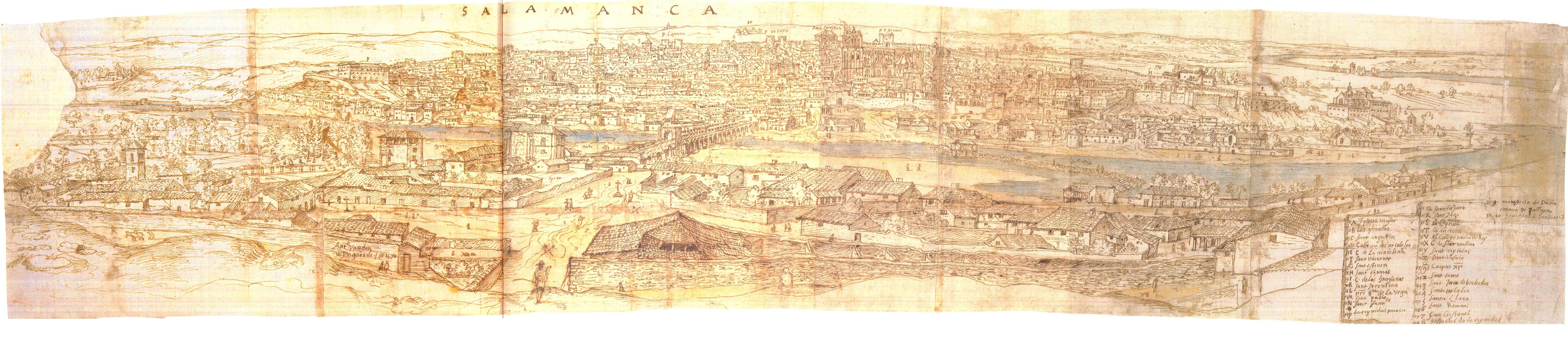
Traveler Anton van den Wyngaerde portrays the city from the arrabal in 1570. The central monument is evident.

Another major repair of the bridge occurred in 1767 so as to maintain the eleven modern and fifteen Roman arches.

=== Nineteenth century and beyond ===
The Battle of Salamanca, known in Spanish as the Battle of the Arapiles (la batalla de los Arapiles), was fought just south of Salamanca in the hills of Arapil Chico and Arapil Grande on 22 July 1812. This battle was part of the Peninsular War with British and Portuguese forces against the Napoleonic French. Due to its strategic position, the bridge became a military target. The day before the battle, the Duke of Wellington, who commanded the British and Portuguese forces, captured the bridge and the nearby fords across the Tormes River at Santa Marta and Aldea Luenga, and from here could direct the attack against the French troops. This battle was a turning point in the Peninsullar War, with the Roman bridge of Salamanca being a central strategic target.

In contemporary times, modern vehicular bridges have replaced the Roman bridge of Salamanca for purposes of commerce. The bridge has subsequently been closed to all but pedestrians, while it retains its cultural and historic significance to the city of Salamanca.

== Artistic and literary depictions ==
The Roman bridge of Salamanca has been the subject of many artistic and literary works over the centuries of its existence. The bridge is used as the setting for the 1914 novel "Niebla" by Miguel de Unamuno. Romance artists David Roberts in 1837 and Gustave Doré in 1862 portrayed the Roman bridge of Salamanca in artistic works. The bridge is depicted in artistic works by Wyngaerde, Ober, and Fenn, in addition to works by many other artists.
