= Navacepeda de Tormes =

Hamlet in San Juan de Gredos, Spain

Coordinates: 40°21′38″N 5°14′58″W

Navacepeda de Tormes is a Spanish hamlet which belongs to the municipality San Juan de Gredos. Consequently it is located in the province Ávila and in the autonomous community Castile and León. Its population consisted of 161 inhabitants in the year 2018.

This administrative division was historically an independent municipality, but since 1975 it has been part of San Juan de Gredos.

One notable element in this locality is a church consecrated to Virgen de la Antigua, which is a version of Mary, mother of Jesus. Another remarkable element of this hamlet is one festivity. It is held on 1 May and it is named "El día de rodar el huevo" (the day when rolling eggs) because a tradition of this festive day is rolling eggs that have got the maroon colour because they have previously been boiled with rubia roots.
