= Tormes =

River in Spain

Coordinates: 41.2925°N 6.47972°W

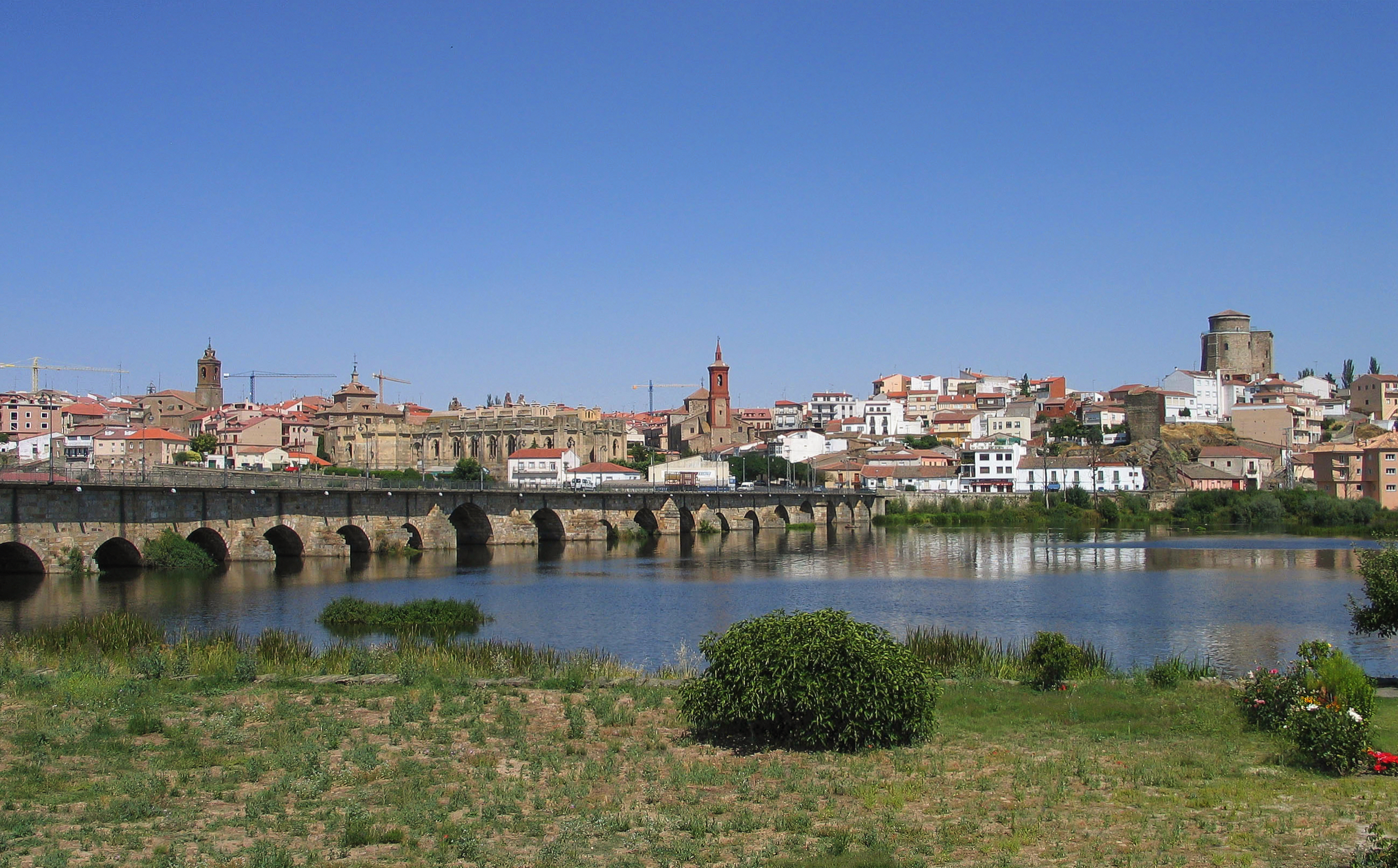
The Tormes River in Alba de Tormes.

The Tormes is a Spanish river that starts in Prado Tormejón, in the mountain range of Gredos, Navarredonda de Gredos, province of Ávila. It crosses the provinces of Avila and Salamanca, ending at the Duero River, at a place known locally as Ambasaguas, after 284 kilometres (176 mi). This river is not able to provide the water supply to the population during summer, and for this reason, the dam of Santa Teresa was constructed in 1960 with a capacity of 496 million cubic metres (402,000 acre⋅ft) to regulate and assure the water supply in summer as well as moderate high flows in winter. Also, it has the dam of Villagonzalo and the Almendra Dam, near where it joins the Duero. Due to limitations in providing water supply to the population during summer, the Tormes River plays a crucial role in water management through its dams.

- Length: 284 km
- Rate of flow: 42.43 m³/sec.
- Surface of the river basin: 7,096 square kilometres (2,740 sq mi)
- Country that it crosses: Spain
- Mouth: Duero River at Fermoselle

== Localities by which it passes ==
From north to south:

- Salamanca
- Santa Marta de Tormes
- Alba de Tormes
- Guijuelo
- Puente del Congosto
- Navamorales
- El Losar
- El Barco de Ávila
- The Alder grove of Tormes
- Narrowness of Tormes
- Holes of the Hawthorn
- Navacepeda de Tormes

== Tributaries ==
- Zurguén stream
- Corneja
- Almar
- Aravalle
- Becedillas
- Caballeruelo
- Alhándiga
- Valdeascas

== See also ==
- List of rivers of Spain
- Roman bridge of Salamanca
