= San Juan de Gredos =

- municipality
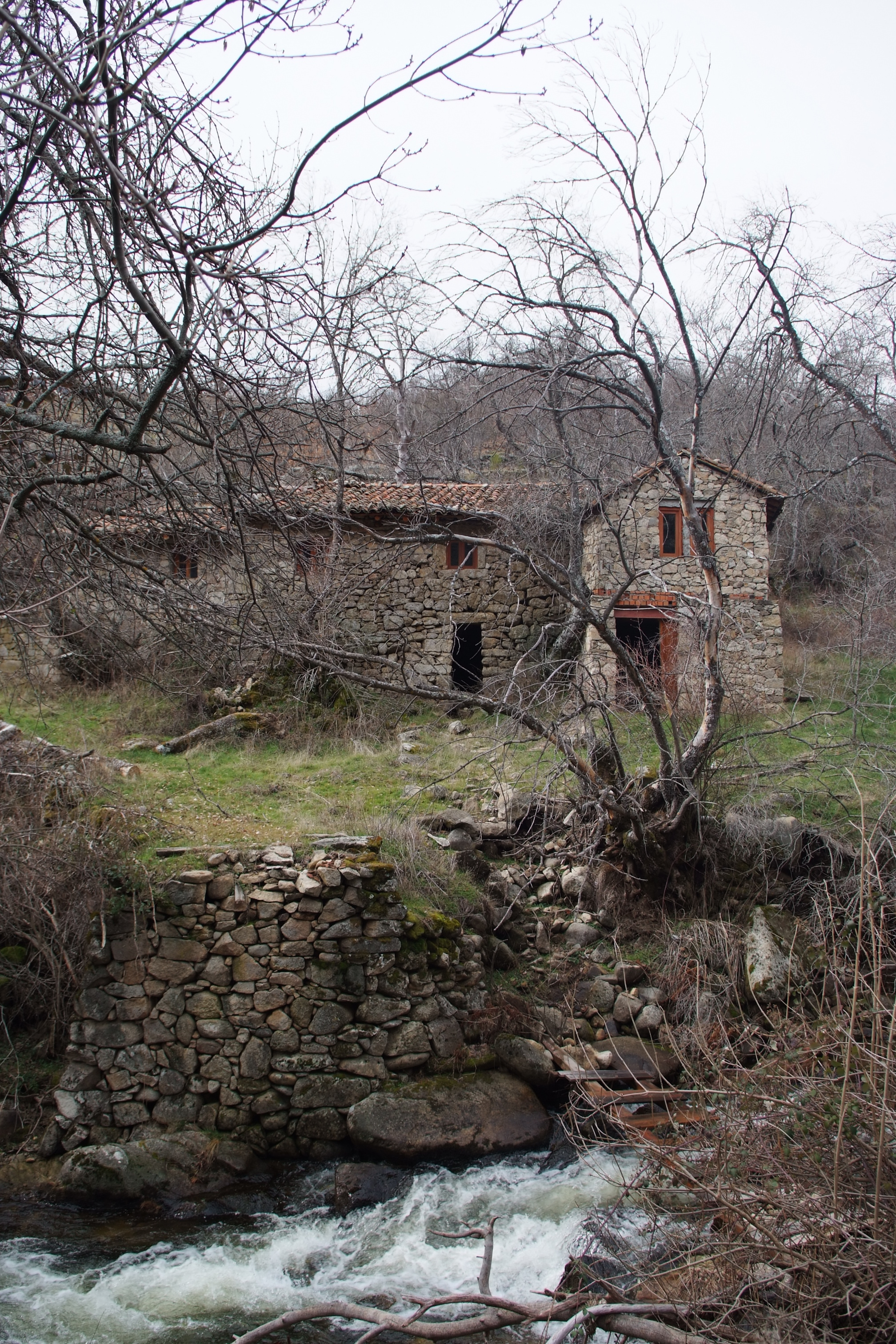
- Mill in San Juan de Gredos

- Flag Coat of arms

- Location in Spain. San Juan de Gredos (Spain)
- Coordinates: 40°21′22″N 5°14′32″W
- Country: Spain
- Autonomous community: Castile and León
- Province: Ávila
- Municipality: San Juan de Gredos

Area
  - Total: 95.91 km^{2} (37.03 sq mi)
- Elevation: 1,348 m (4,423 ft)

Population (2025-01-01)
  - Total: 219
  - Density: 4.2/km^{2} (11/sq mi)
- Time zone: UTC+1 (CET)
  - Summer (DST): UTC+2 (CEST)
- Website: Official website

San Juan de Gredos is a municipality located in the province of Ávila, Castile and León, Spain.

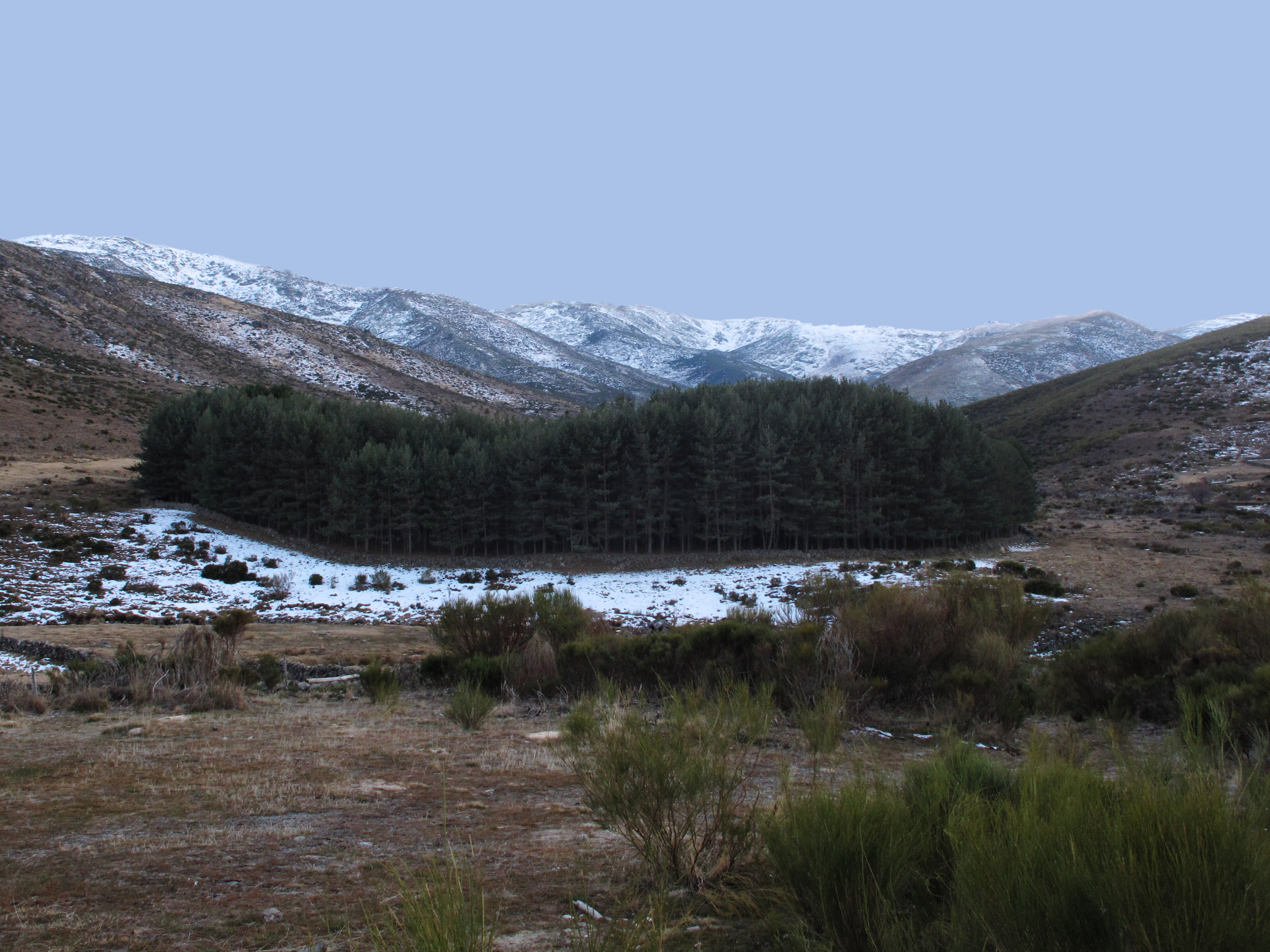
Isolate forest of scotch pine in the northern slopes of Sierra de Gredos

The municipality is formed of three independent hamlets: Navacepeda de Tormes, San Bartolomé de Tormes and La Herguijuela.

In the locality of Navacepeda de Tormes an ancient brown bear claw is found embedded at the church porch.

== Population ==
Historical population
| Year | Pop. | ±% p.a. |
|---|---|---|
| 2023 | 248 | — |
| 2024 | 228 | −8.06% |
| 2025 | 219 | −3.95% |
Source: INE
