= Medinilla, Castile and León =

Medinilla
- municipality
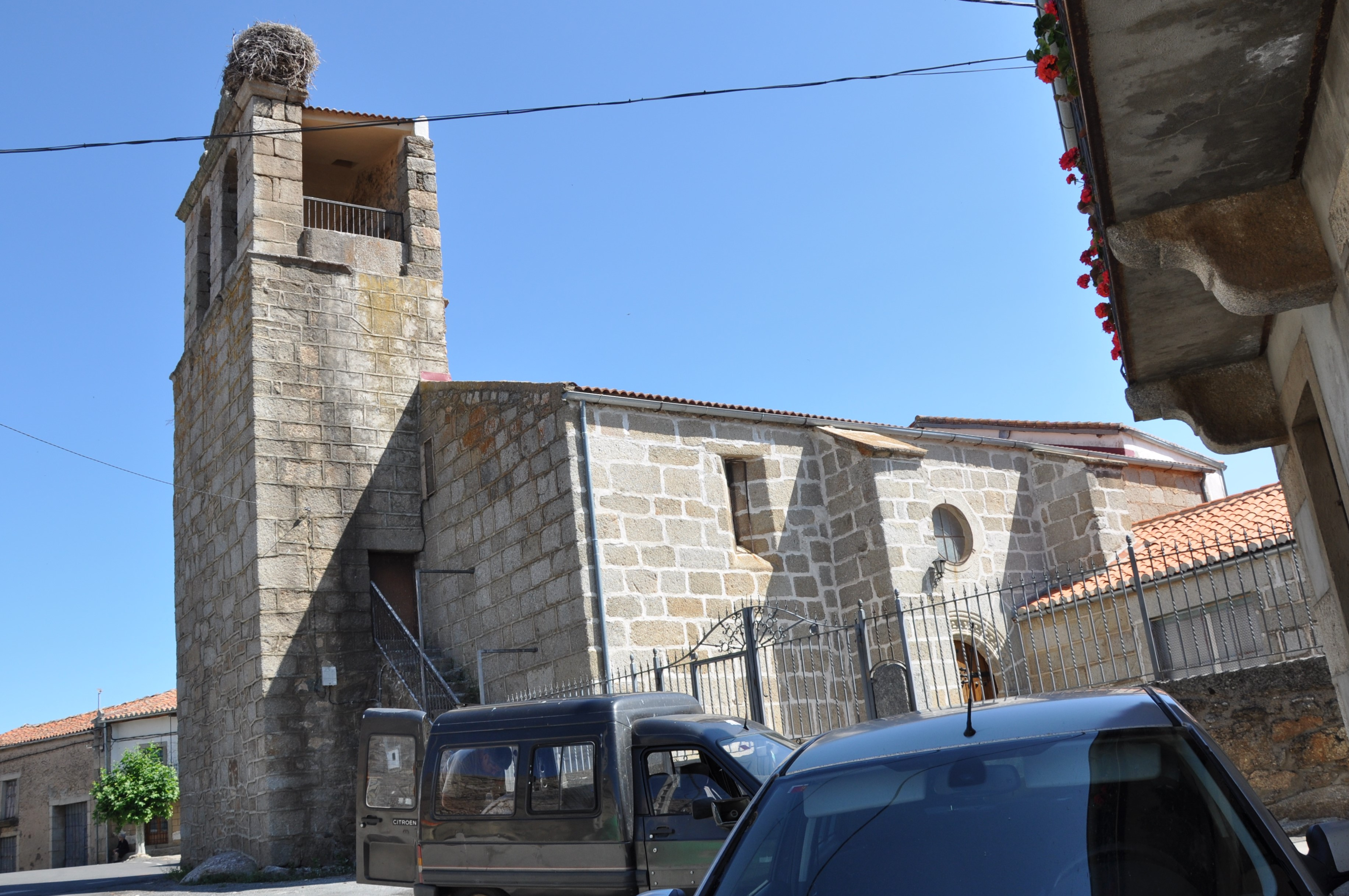
- Parish church of San Julián confessor, 17th century, Medinilla, Ávila, Spain

- Flag Coat of arms
- Interactive map of Medinilla
- Coordinates: 40.4333°N 5.6167°W
- Country: Spain
- Autonomous community: Castile and León
- Province: Ávila
- Municipality: Medinilla

Area
  - Total: 22.88 km^{2} (8.83 sq mi)
- Elevation: 1,066 m (3,497 ft)
- Time zone: UTC+1 (CET)
  - Summer (DST): UTC+2 (CEST)
- Website: https://www.medinilla.es

Medinilla is a municipality in Ávila, Castile and León, Spain. It belongs to the judicial district of Piedrahita.

== Population ==
Historical population
| Year | Pop. | ±% p.a. |
|---|---|---|
| 2023 | 78 | — |
| 2024 | 77 | −1.28% |
| 2025 | 79 | +2.60% |
Source: INE

== Government ==
Miguel Izquierdo Martín was elected mayor for the electoral period of 2023-2027.
