= Monastery of Our Lady of the Risco =

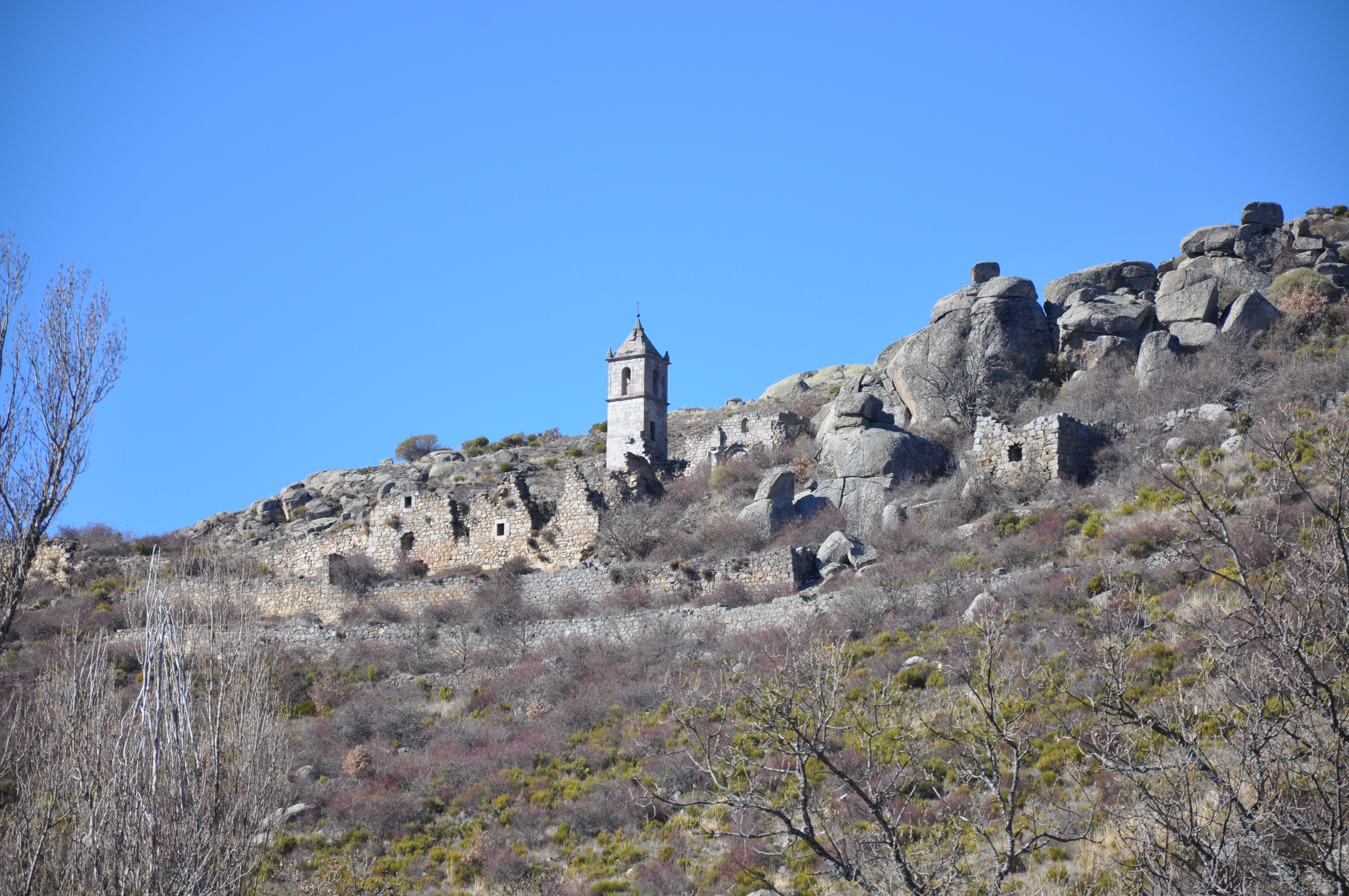

Religion
- Affiliation: Roman Catholic church
- Province: Diocese of Ávila
- Ecclesiastical or organizational status: Ruined
- Year consecrated: 1504

Location
- Location: Amavida, Ávila, Castile and León, Spain
- Interactive map of Monastery of Our Lady of the Risco
- Coordinates: 40°35′29″N 5°05′35″W

Architecture
- Type: Late gothic
- Completed: ?

The Monastery of Our Lady of the Risco is a ruined Augustinian convent located above Amavida in the Sierra de Ávila, Castile and León, Spain. It was founded in 1504 by Francisco de la Parra under the invocation of Our Lady of Sorrows, under the title Our Lady of the Risco.

It constituted an important center of evangelization and practically the only cultural center during the Late Middle Ages in the alfoz of what is now the province of Ávila.

The monastery had a church, a cloister, a residence for monks, an oriel, terraces for cultivation, a hostel for pilgrims, stables, warehouses and a good water supply network and access roads.

Currently only the bell tower remains, along with the entrance arch of the old church, part of the apse (hidden by vegetation) and remains of the walls of different dependencies.

== Location ==
The monastery is located in the Valley of Amblés, northwest of the town of Amavida, municipality that belongs to the year 2000 and where it is visible.

From the top of the tower of this ancient building complex, it is possible to see the whole valley, which is flanked by the Sierra de la Paramera to the South, La Serrota to the West and the Sierra de Ávila to the North.

Even on very clear days, from this location you can see Navacerrada (in the Community of Madrid) and the mountain of the Dead Woman, already in Segovia.

The monastery was formerly a meeting point between three well-defined paths that originated in Villatoro, Vadillo de la Sierra and Amavida.

Currently access can be made from the same Amavida, following old stone roads that are partially paved, or from the North, following the path that comes from Vadillo de la Sierra.

== History ==
The oldest identifiable remains on the area where this monastery was found correspond to a series of petroglyphs that can be seen near the ruins of the convent. In a hollow between large rocks, which gives access to a platform, two circles are engraved on the rock, one with a double radius than the other, separated by a triangle.

The triangle could be a representation of a mountain and the circles representing the sun and the moon, interpretation that would be endorsed by being oriented towards the so-called Risco del Sol, peak located on the other side of the Valley of Amblés, in the Sierra de la Paramera. But until now it has not been possible to identify the origin and the meaning.

According to the tradition, the cult in this place begins times of the Muslim conquest, when the Christians hid in this same area and sheltered from a rock, an image of the Virgin of Sorrows so that it was not destroyed by the infidels.

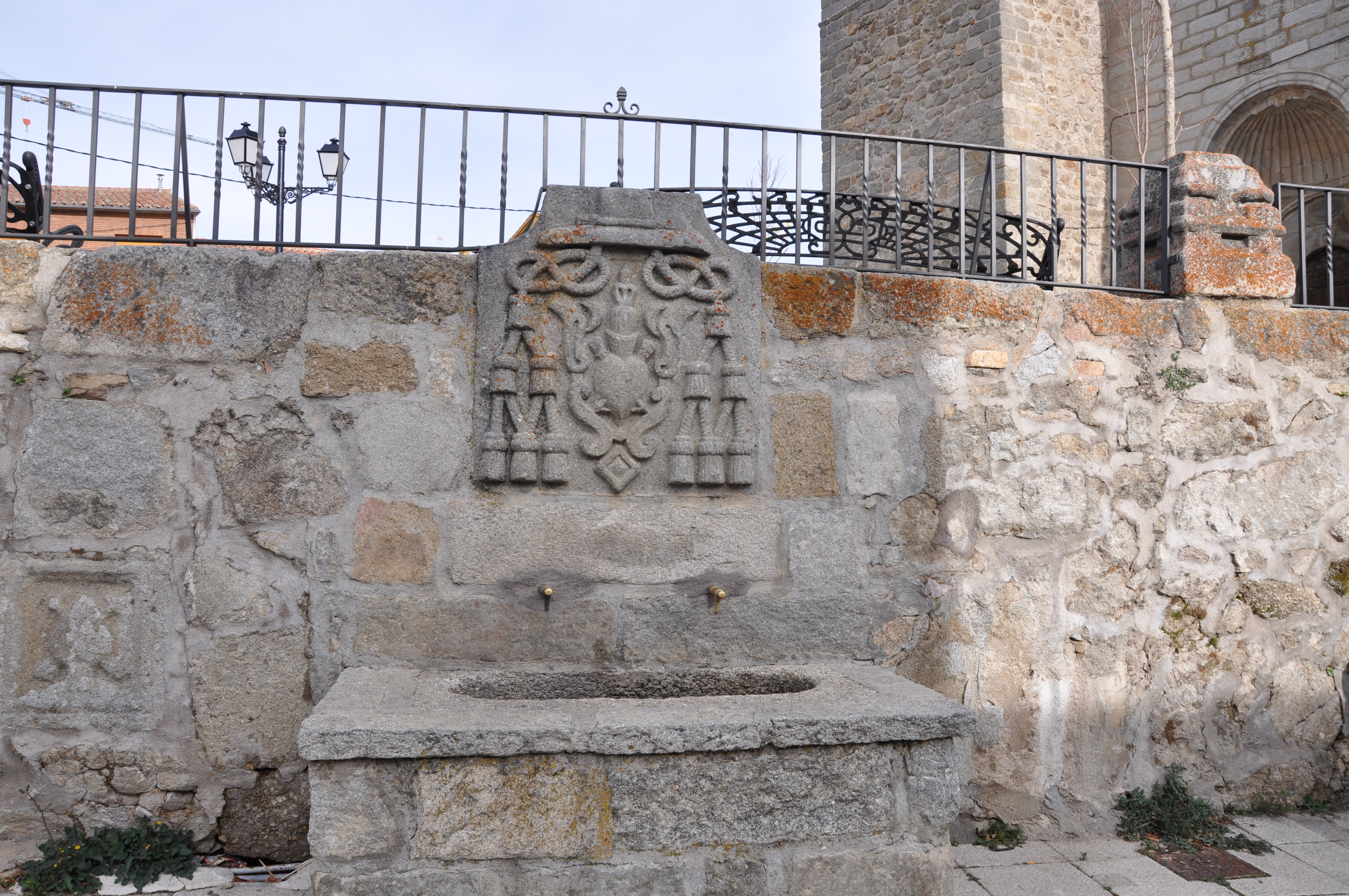
Coat of arms of the Augustinians from the Monastery, today in Villatoro

The story tells that in the 14th century, year 1320, a shepherd who was looking for a goat that had been lost to him, found the image of the Virgin of the Risco in a cave. A figure of the Virgin leaning on a cross and holding her dead Son in her arms.

Among the stones where it was found, Fray Francisco de la Parra erected in 1504 a small chapel under the abomination of the Virgin of Sorrows, denominating it Nuestra Señora del Risco. Father Francisco, an Augustinian who had directed the most important monastic houses in Castile, decided to retire to the Cistercian hermitage to spend his last days in it, but given his entrepreneurial spirit he did not hesitate in a few years to request the Lord of Villatoro and the Bishop Ruiz who granted him authorization to create a convent on the spot.

In this way, in 1530 the chapel was transformed into a convent of the order of San Agustín, with a construction of late Gothic style, with nuances that resemble the Herrerian style.

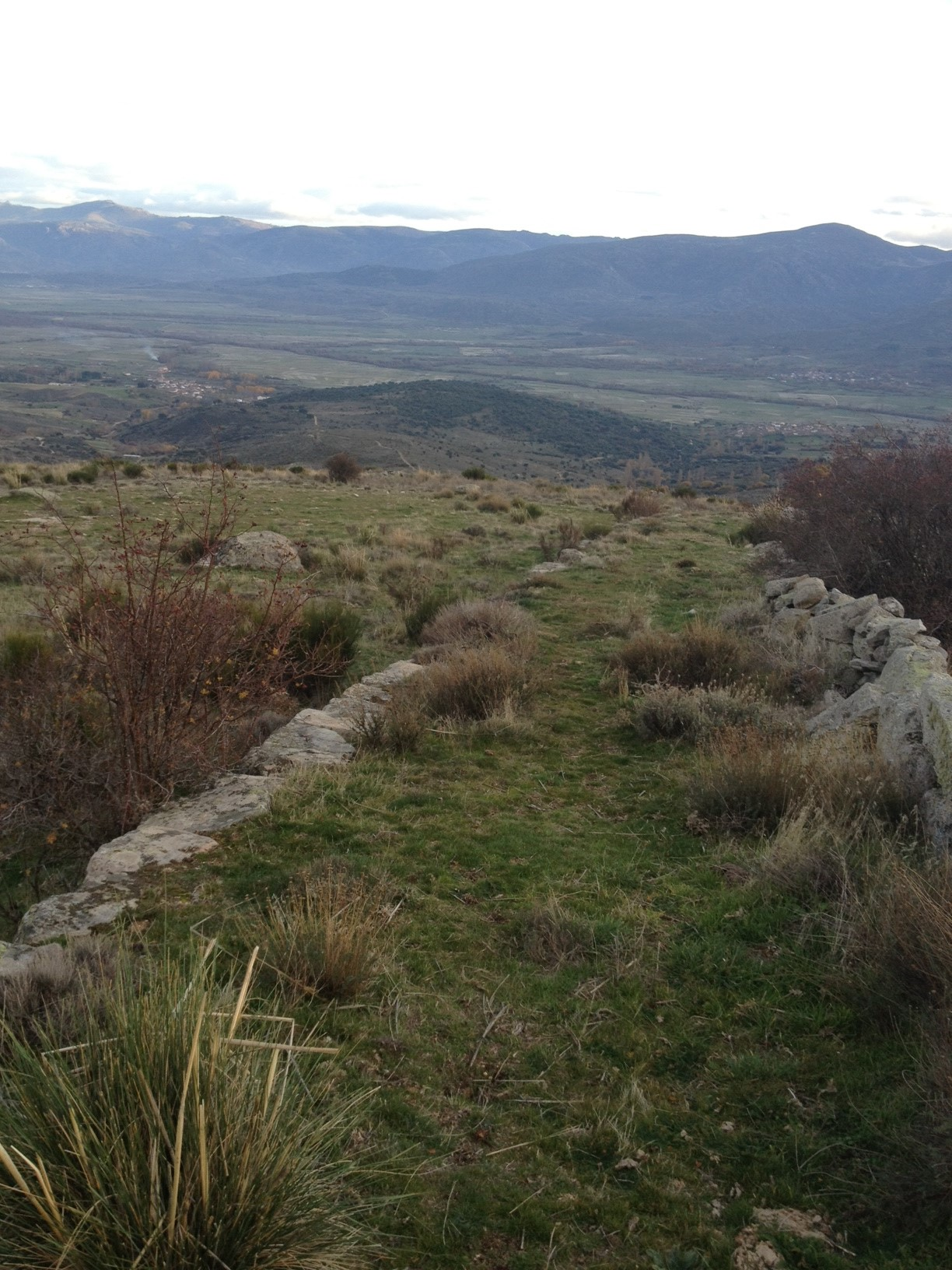
Old cobblestone road leading to the monastery of Nuestra Señora del Risco from the town of Amavida

In the year 1564, through the mediation of his fourth prior, Antonio de Priego, it was achieved, with the consent of the mitrado J. Bernardo de Fresneda, that his provisor, Antonio Hernández, give new license so that "they can ask for alms in the entire bishopric "(December 15, 1564). From that moment the Augustinian convent of the Risco, becomes not only a place of meditation and pilgrimage, but also a place of wealth that, soon, due to its rapid economic development, had a decisive influence in the region. During the seventeenth century, the only documents to be highlighted are: the transfer to the convent by the archbishop and captain general of Mexico, Fray Payo Enríquez de Ribera, of two censuses in Madrid on wine and oil silk (1683); and another in which an assessment is made of the assets they owned in Mombeltrán, which are estimated at 69,966 reals.

At the beginning of the seventeenth century, the cattle ranch owned by the Risco convent was relatively important (it is estimated that it came to own up to 5,000 heads of sheep), but its financial activities were not limited exclusively to this exploitation, but included others such as the agricultural and industrial.

The church was renovated in the late seventeenth century, in 1775 its magnificent tower was erected and in 1791 neoclassical altarpieces were added to the naves of the temple. Its decline would begin in the 19th century.

During the War of Independence it was a place of refuge for guerrillas. He suffered the effects of the French occupation and the ravages of the looting of the locals, who resented the unfavorable conditions they had suffered for years took advantage of the situation to get what they could from the monastery.

From then on, only a few monks remained and in 1835 it was affected by the decree of exclaustration of convents that did not have a minimum of twelve religious.

Later it would suffer the effects of the Spanish confiscation and the deterioration caused by the abandonment.

== The Risco and the Mesta ==
The cattle belonging to the Risco participated in the transhumance between the pastures of Castile and the pastures of Extremadura. But most of the time, the Rogues cattle moved in short distances; Campo Arañuelo and, especially, the meadow of Fuente el Caño, in Gálvez (Toledo). In numerous writings it is evident that the friars of the Risco, were integrated into the Mesta organization. They resorted to it when it became necessary to defend their interests, and like the rest of their farmers contributed their contribution to maintain it. It is documented for the towns of the Community and comarcanos the payment of mestilla, but the Risco, in addition to the contributions that were customary for the maintenance of the Honorable Council of the Mesta, participated with a contribution that, as gratitude of the Council of the Mesta, towards the king in times of need.

So in 1793 it was agreed that the contribution of the Honorable Council should be a story (one million) of reals in four years, so it was passed to the Risco request to make effective its corresponding quota, in these terms:

... pay to the Community's treasury what corresponds to it according to its number of cattle of all the species that it has, for which it will remit to V.R. a signed and sworn relation with the individual, and specifying that the same institution comes, which must be examined and recognized by the accountant Mr. Gregorio Ángel López, whom I have commissioned for the collection, and whose intervention will be given by the Treasury corresponding receipt

== The Risco and the confiscation ==
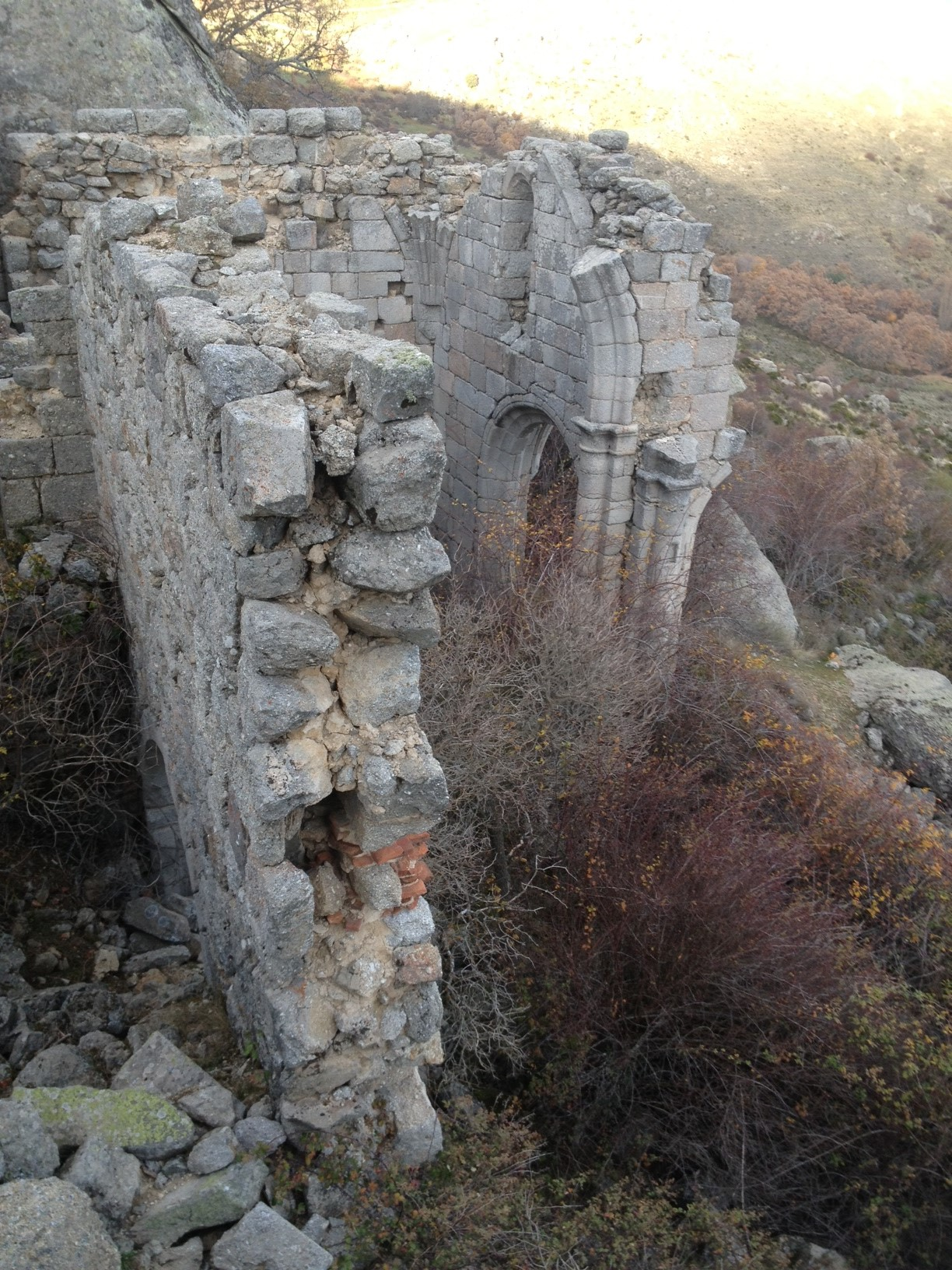
Remains of the apse and part of the walls of the church that remain standing

On October 29, 1835, affected by the first decree of exclaustration referring to the convents that did not have a minimum of twelve religious, the finalization and exclaustration of the monastery of Our Lady of the Risco, by the commissioner Gaspar Domínguez, is determined.

In the year 1843, the estate of 11 hectares in which the monastery is included, is sold for a price of 101,000 reales, with its buyers Juan Torres and Pascual Fidalgo.

The same year 1843 the convent was auctioned at 22,000 reais; "It announces the auction of the building that was a convent of Augustinians distant 3/4 of the Villatoro league, which only existed the walls, and is the main facade masonry, corners of the entire building and tower, which is no less detrimental, and six beams 36 feet long and four thick." The convent went back to auction on May 30 of the same year (the reasons are ignored and who was the buyer, but it was undoubtedly the official who made the annotations of the auction, since the book of the award is placed by hand "YO" (in Spanish: I).

Still today you can see the cobblestone roads, some walls of its factory, the terraces, the work of water supply and other services. Finally, the splendid tower, which Antonio Aguileta saw finish in 1773.

Most of the clothes and jewelry of this convent, as well as the bells and the image of the Virgin, were taken down to the parish of Villatoro, where today the image of Our Lady of Sorrows presides over the main altarpiece. But not only Villatoro was the one who inherited the property of the Risco, one of the ternos and some other things were taken to Piedrahita, another terno, the best that the religious had taken him to the convent of the Holy in Ávila and the image of San Agustín It was for the parish of Vadillo de la Sierra.

Two order missals were also sent to Ávila for the sanctuary of Nuestra Señora de Sonsoles, as well as for the parishes of Santo Domingo and San Pedro, and even to the Cathedral of Salvador de Ávila, some of the images of the Risco arrived.

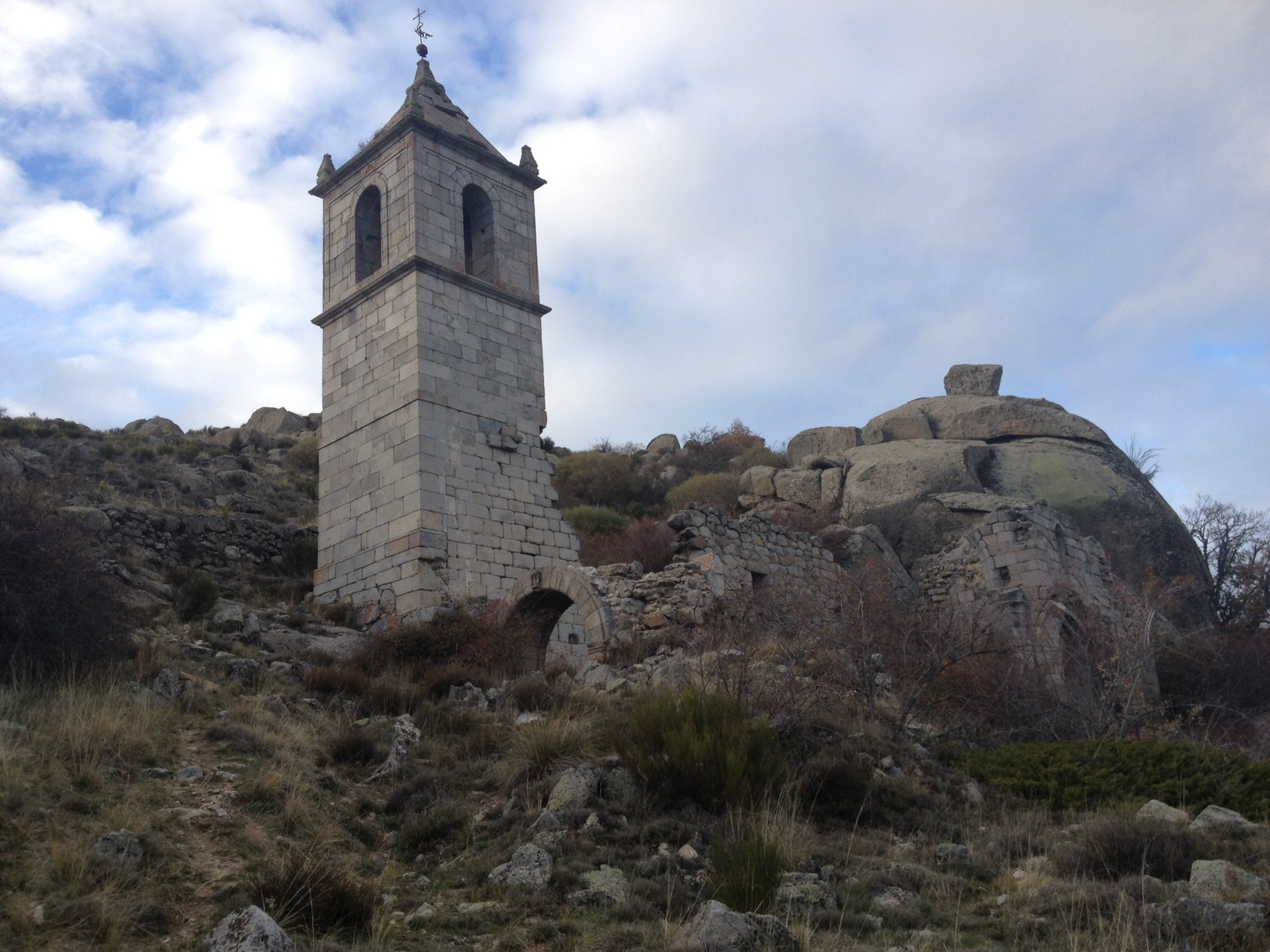
Remains of the bell tower, the main entrance arch to the old church and walls of the east façade

== Illustrious people ==
The monastery was an important reference within the order of the Augustinians. Important figures such as Payo Enriquez de Rivera, Viceroy of New Spain, Enrique Flórez de Setien and Manuel Risco, Augustinian historians and co-author of España Sagrada, passed through it.

== Monuments and cultural places of interest nearby ==
A few kilometers around the remains of the monastery are located remains and historical monuments, which make this region an enclave of special cultural interest:

- Verraco de Villanueva del Campillo, the largest in the Iberian Peninsula.
- Cañada Real Leonesa Occidental
- Castro de Ulaca, in Solosancho
- Necropolis of La Coba
- Sanctuary of Our Lady of the Fuentes
- Bridge of the Cobos
- Castro of the Castillejos (Sanchorreja)
- Castro de la Mesa de Miranda
- Castle of Aunqueospese
- Castle of Villaviciosa
- Work of the Basque sculptor Agustín Ibarrola in the Dehesa de Garoza in Muñogalindo

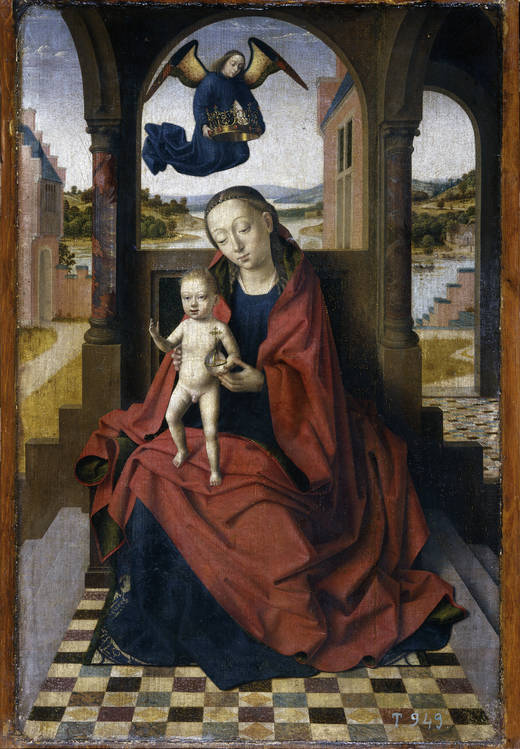
The Virgin with the Child by Petrus Christus, a picture that belonged to the Monastery and that, with the Confiscation, passed to the Museum of the Trinity and after the suppression of it to the Prado, where it is exhibited today.
