= Pasarilla del Rebollar =

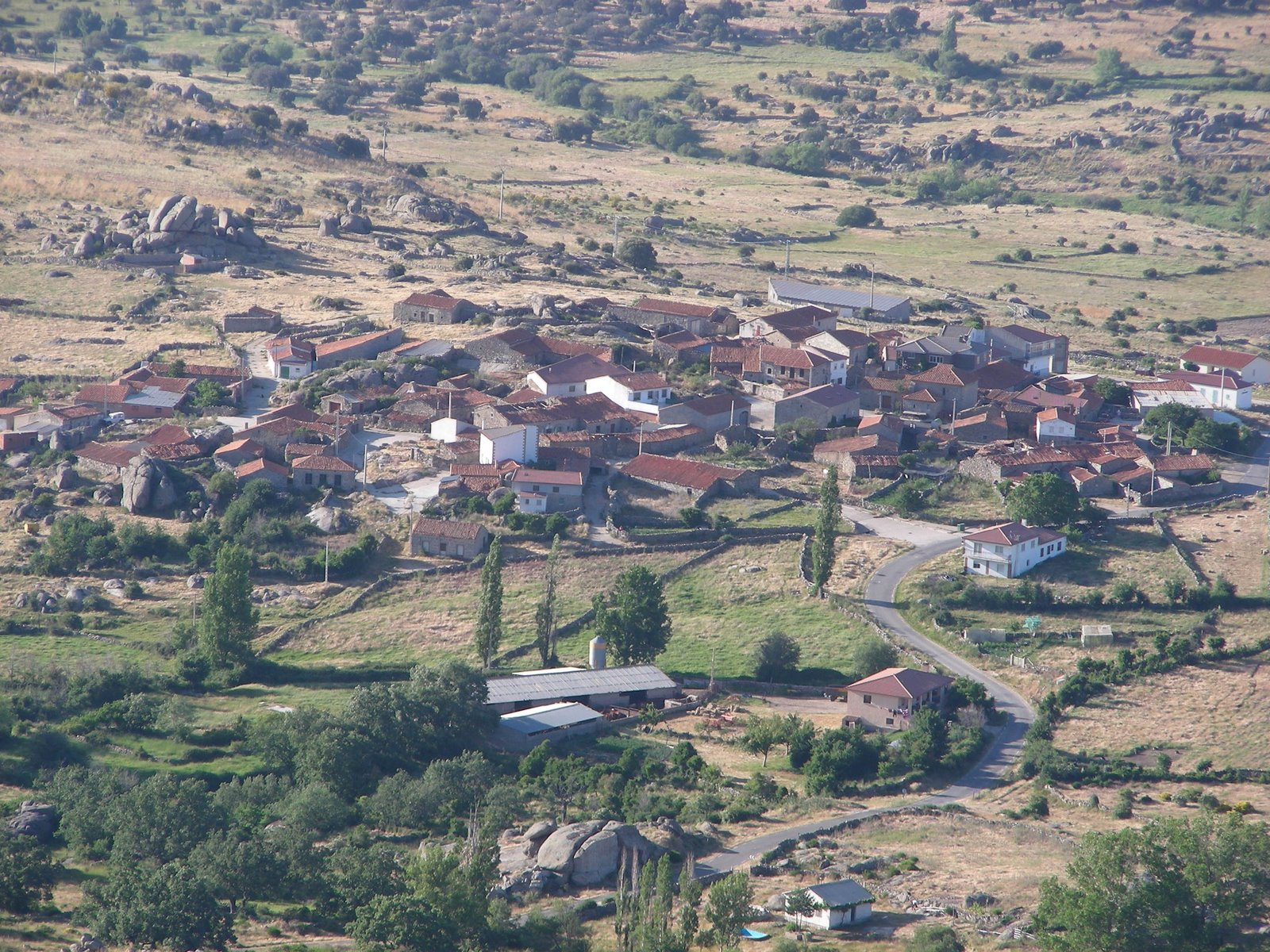
- View from the Cerro de Gorría

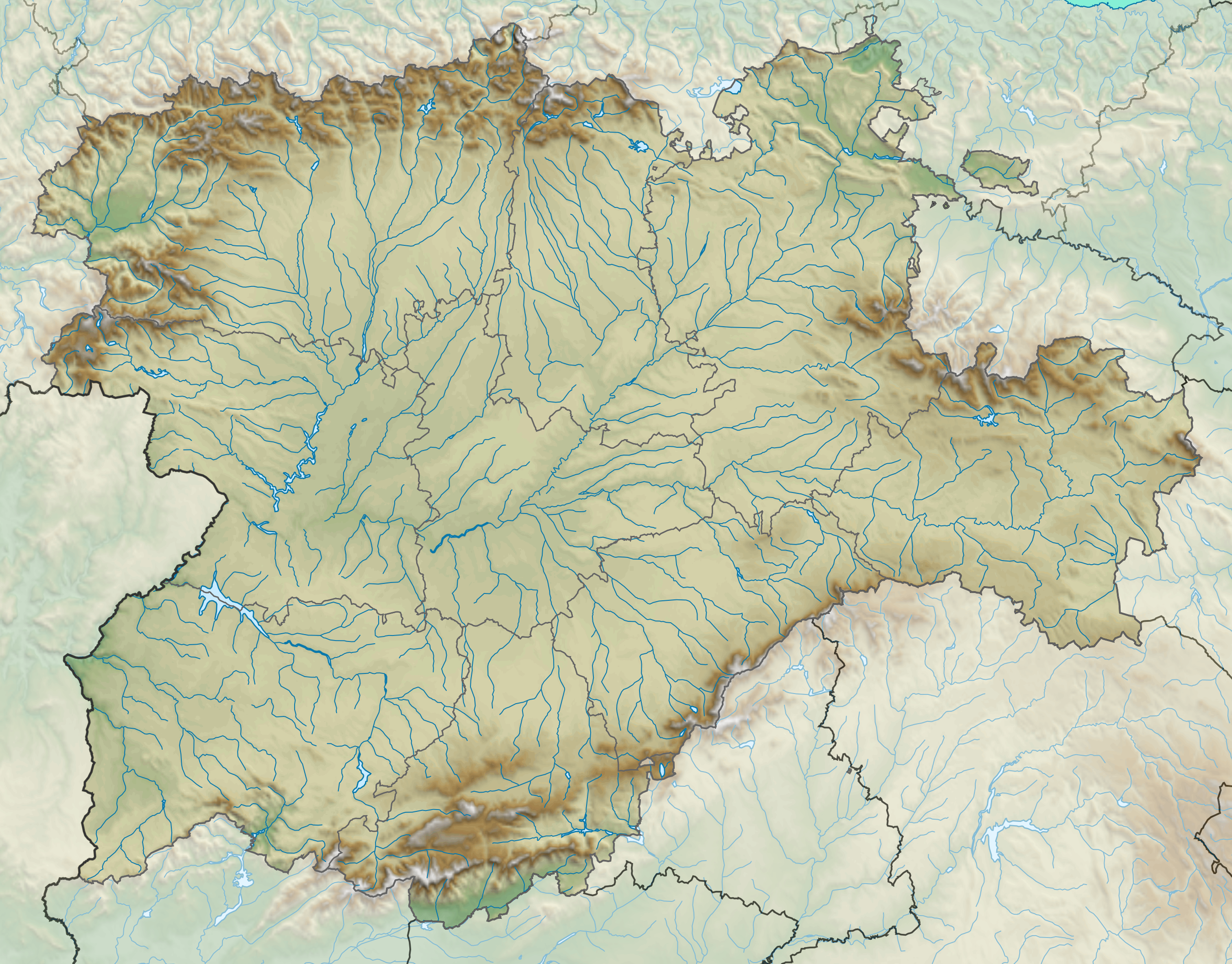
- Location in Castile and León
- Coordinates: 40.679°N 5.007°W
- Country: Spain
- Autonomous community: Castile and León
- Province: Ávila
- Municipality: Valdecasa
- Elevation: 1,300 m (4,300 ft)
- Time zone: UTC+1 (CET)
  - Summer (DST): UTC+2 (CEST)

Pasarilla del Rebollar is a populated place (anejo) of the Spanish municipality of Valdecasa, province of Ávila, Castile and León.

Once a municipality, it was merged into Valdecasa before the 1857 census. It lies at about 1300 metres above sea level at the feet of the Cerro de Gorría. In 2008, the neighbors raised a complaint to the Procurador del Común, vis-à-vis the village's protracted water supply problems.
