= Payo Enríquez de Rivera =

Spanish Augustinian friar (1622–1684)

The Most Reverend Payo Enríquez de Rivera y Manrique, O.E.S.A.
- Archbishop of Mexico
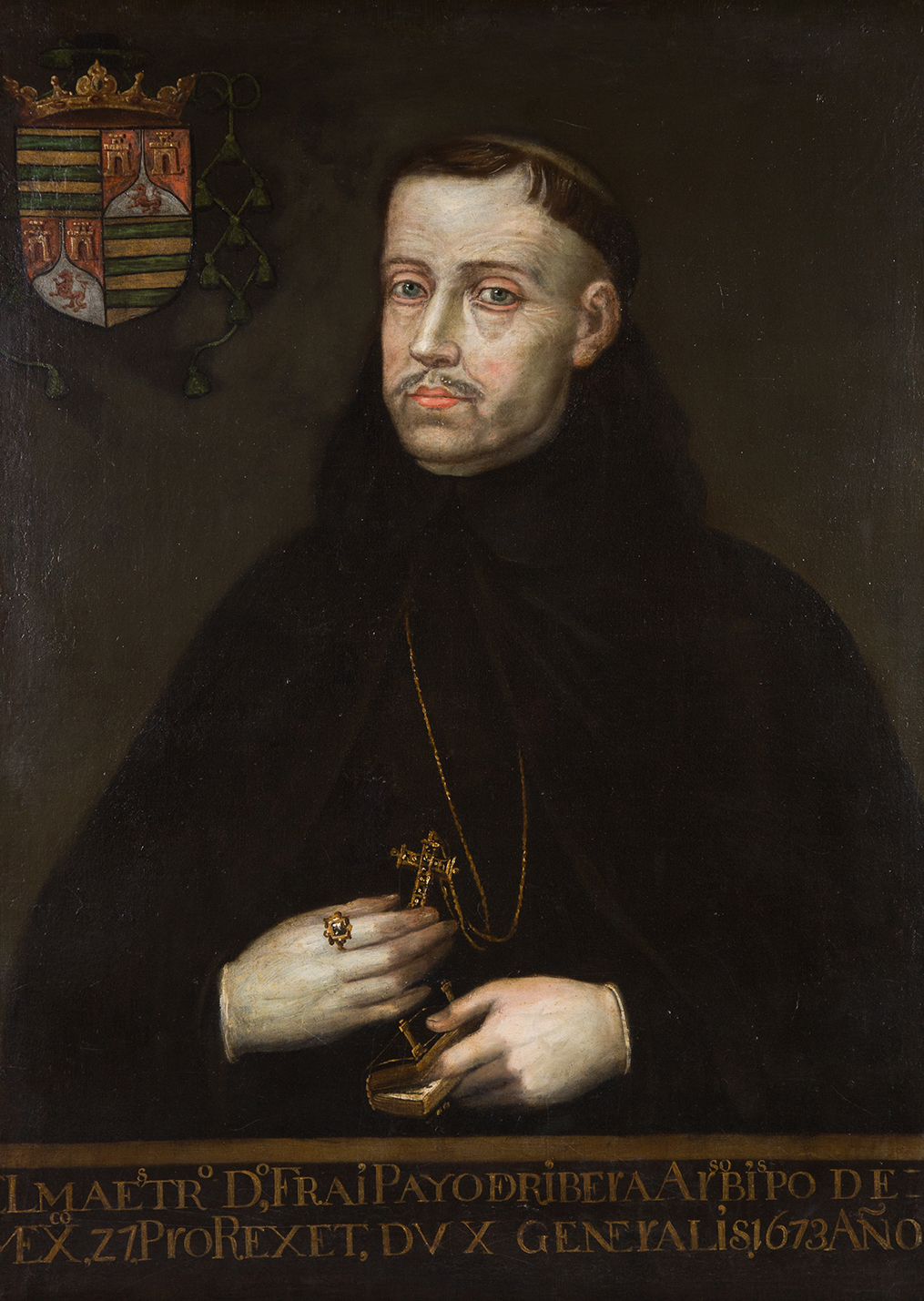
- Portrait painted in 1673
- Archdiocese: Archdiocese of Mexico
- Appointed: 17 September 1668
- Term ended: 30 June 1681
- Predecessor: Marcos Ramírez de Prado y Ovando, O.F.M.
- Successor: Francisco de Aguiar y Seijas y Ulloa
- Other posts: Bishop of Michoacán (1668); Bishop of Guatemala (1657–1668)

Orders
- Consecration: September 1658 by Alonso de Briceño, O.F.M.

Personal details
- Born: 1622 Seville, Andalusia, Crown of Castile
- Died: 8 April 1684 (aged 61–62) Monastery of Nuestra Señora del Risco, Sierra de Ávila, Ávila, Crown of Castile
- Parents: Fernando Afán de Ribera and Leonor Manrique

27th Viceroy of New Spain
- In office 13 December 1673 – 30 November 1680
- Monarch: King Charles II
- Regent: Mariana of Austria
- Valido: Fernando de Valenzuela; John Joseph of Austria; Duke of Medinaceli
- Preceded by: The Duke of Veragua
- Succeeded by: The Count of Paredes

Arms of Payo Enríquez de Rivera y Manrique

Payo Enríquez de Rivera y Manrique, O.E.S.A. (also Payo Enríquez Afán de Rivera y Manrique or Payo Afán Enríquez de Ribera Manrique de Lara), (1622 – 8 April 1684) was a Spanish Augustinian friar who served as the Bishop of Guatemala (1657–67), Archbishop of Mexico (1668–1681) and Viceroy of New Spain (13 December 1673 – 30 November 1680).

== Ecclesiastical career ==
Enríquez de Rivera was born in Seville, the illegitimate son of Fernando Afán de Ribera, duke of Alcalá de los Gazules and Leonor Manrique. He entered the Order of St. Augustine in Madrid. He graduated from the University of Osuna and then taught theology there and in Burgos, Valladolid and Alcalá. He came to know King Philip IV of Spain, who held him in high esteem. Enríquez was superior of various Augustinian monasteries in Castile.

On 9 July 1657, Enríquez de Rivera was appointed the Bishop of Guatemala in the Viceroyalty of New Spain by Pope Alexander VII. He sailed to Caracas, where he was consecrated for his new post by the bishop of that city. In Guatemala he ordained the first Bethlehemites, a religious order recently founded in that colony by St. Peter of Saint Joseph Betancur, to advance to the priesthood, and he began the construction of the Hospital de San Pedro.

In January 1668 Enríquez de Rivera was transferred by Pope Clement IX to the Diocese of Michoacán in New Spain, but while he was on the road to take up his new position, news reached him that he was to become, instead, the Archbishop of Mexico. He governed there from 1668 to 1681.

In his position as archbishop, Enríquez de Rivera came to know Sor Juana de la Cruz, a Hieronymite nun of the city who was to become one of the leading literary figures of colonial Mexico. He gave her his protection and encouraged her in her writing.

== As Viceroy of New Spain ==
Upon the death of Viceroy Pedro Nuño Colón de Portugal on 13 December 1673, Eníquez became viceroy, according to instructions which the Queen Regent, Mariana of Austria, had secretly sent to the Inquisition there. On that day, the Inquisitor, Juan de Ortega, delivered the sealed instructions to the Audiencia, and the government was transferred to the archbishop.

Among Enríquez de Rivera's acts as viceroy were many public works projects, not only in Mexico City but also in outlying areas. He improved the viceroy's palace and continued work on the drainage system of the Valley of Mexico. He built many bridges over the waterways of Mexico City. He began the reconstruction of the Church of San Augustine (which later contained the National Library) after the church had been nearly destroyed by a fire. He introduced potable water into the Villa de Guadalupe, and repaired the highway to Guadalupe.

On instructions from the Crown Enríquez de Rivera sent a Jesuit mission to California. In 1667 the viceroy founded the village of Paso del Norte (now Ciudad Juárez), on the Río Bravo and the road to Albuquerque. Also that year oyster beds were discovered in the port of Zihuatanejo. He welcomed the Bethlehemite Order of Guatemala into New Spain, and he reiterated the royal prohibition against Indian slavery. The Mexico City mint struck its first gold coins on 6 June 1675.

Enríquez de Rivera reformed (again) the Armada de Barlovento to defend the Gulf Coast against pirates. (English pirates had sacked Campeche on 22 September 1678.) Through his efforts the English were expelled from the Río Coatzacoalcos and the Laguna de Términos.

The viceroy was a patron of seventeenth-century nun and savant, Sor Juana Inés de la Cruz.

== Later career ==
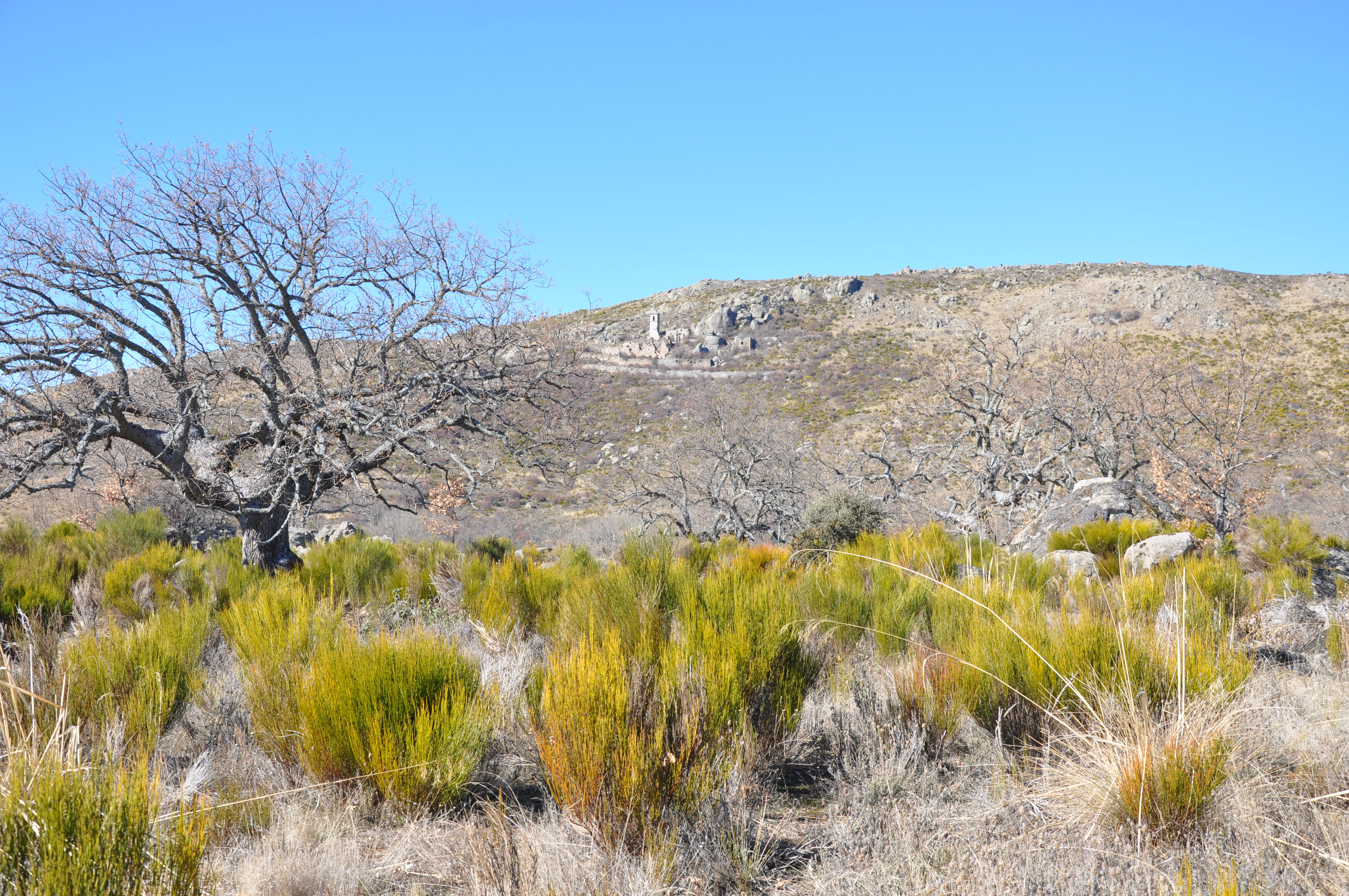
Monastery of El Risco, Ávila, Spain

Overwhelmed by his dual responsibilities, Enríquez de Rivera submitted his resignation from both. When this was accepted on 30 June 1681, he returned to Spain. The library that he had accumulated in Mexico he donated to the Oratory of St. Philip Neri in that city. In Spain he was given the See of Cuenca and was made President of the Council of the Indies. He retired to the rural Monastery of Nuestra Señora del Risco in the Sierra de Ávila, where he died in 1684.

Government offices
| Preceded by The Duke of Veragua | Viceroy of New Spain; 1673–1680 | Succeeded by The Count of Paredes |
Religious titles
| Preceded by Marcos Ramírez de Prado y Ovando | Archbishop of Mexico; 1668–1681 | Succeeded by Francisco de Aguiar |
