= Valdecasa =

- Municipality
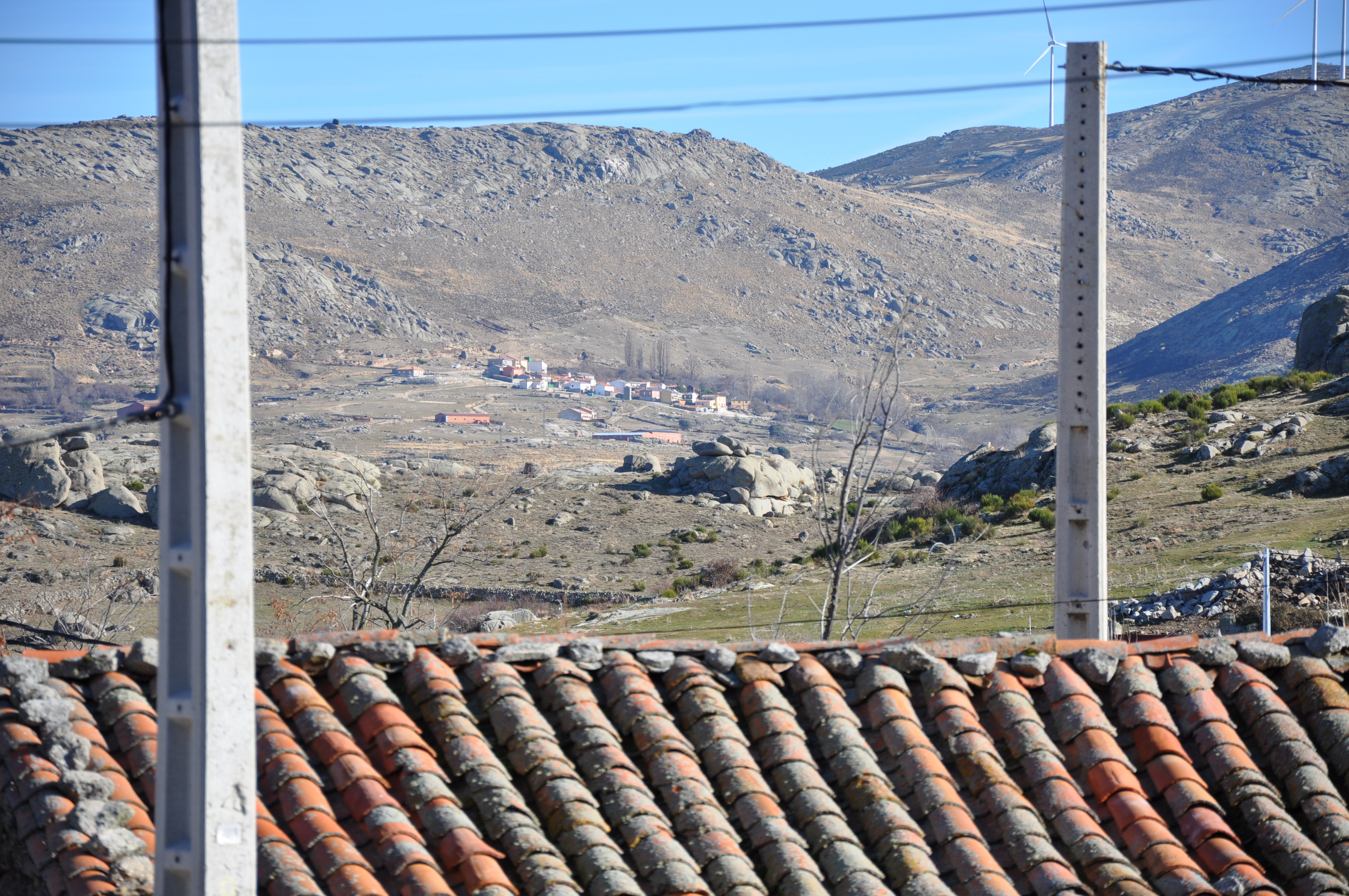
- Valdecasa from San Juan del Olmo
- Flag Coat of arms
- Location in Spain. Valdecasa (Spain)
- Coordinates: 40°39′34″N 5°00′42″W
- Country: Spain
- Autonomous community: Castile and León
- Province: Ávila
- Municipality: Valdecasa

Area
  - Total: 21.76 km^{2} (8.40 sq mi)

Population (2025-01-01)
  - Total: 54
  - Density: 2.5/km^{2} (6.4/sq mi)
- Time zone: UTC+1 (CET)
  - Summer (DST): UTC+2 (CEST)
- Website: Official website

Valdecasa is a municipality located in the province of Ávila, Castile and León, Spain.

The municipality includes the place of Pasarilla del Rebollar.

== Population ==
Historical population
| Year | Pop. | ±% p.a. |
|---|---|---|
| 2023 | 57 | — |
| 2024 | 56 | −1.75% |
| 2025 | 54 | −3.57% |
Source: INE
