= Pedro Nuño Colón de Portugal, 6th Duke of Veragua =

Admiral of the Ocean Sea The Most Excellent The Duke of Veragua
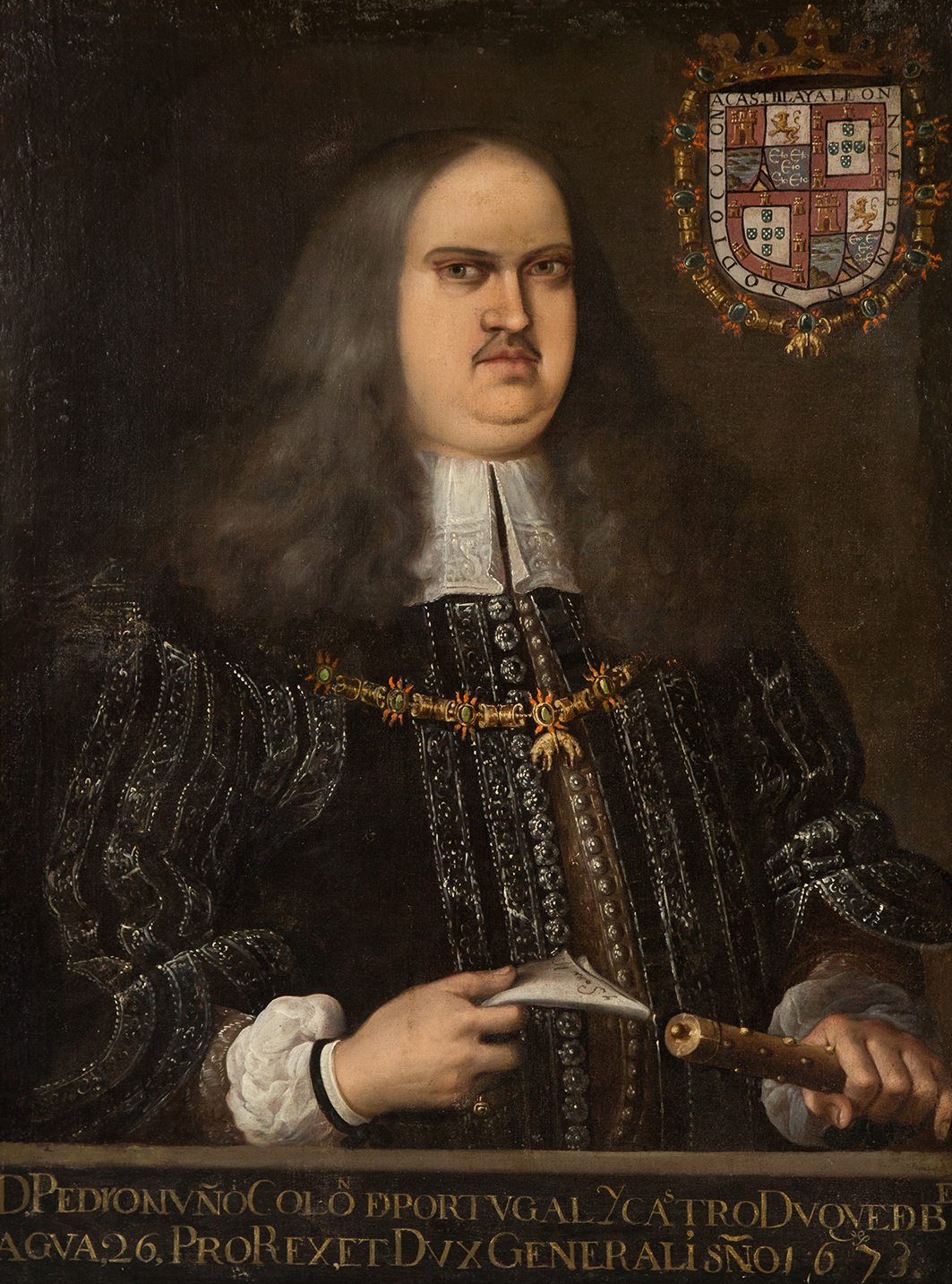

26th Viceroy of New Spain
- In office December 8, 1673 – December 13, 1673
- Monarch: Charles II
- Regent: Mariana of Austria
- Valido: Fernando de Valenzuela
- Preceded by: Antonio Sebastián de Toledo, 2nd Marquess of Mancera
- Succeeded by: Payo Enríquez de Rivera

Personal details
- Born: December 13, 1628 Madrid, Spain
- Died: December 8, 1673 (aged 44) Mexico City, New Spain
- Spouse: Isabel de la Cueva y Enriquez de Cabrera

Pedro Nuño Colón de Portugal y Castro, 6th Duke of Veragua, 6th Marquess of Jamaica, 6th Count of Gelves (Madrid, Spain, 13 December 1628 – December 13, 1673, Mexico City) was viceroy of New Spain from December 8, 1673, to December 13, 1673.

== Early life ==
He was born in Madrid, the son of Álvaro Colón de Portugal y Portocarrero, 5th Duke of Veragua, 4th Duke of la Vega, 6th admiral of the Indies, and of Catalina de Castro y Portugal, 5th countess of Gelves, and descendant of the House of Braganza, distantly related to the Portuguese royal family.

== Career ==
He was a knight of Order of the Golden Fleece, 1670, and also inherited the positions of admiral and governor of the Indies. He became the first viceroy of New Spain named under the authority of King Charles II.

On April 28, 1672, Enrique de Toledo y Osorio, Marquess of Villafranca was named viceroy of New Spain, but he declined the post. Instead, Colón de Portugal was named viceroy on June 10, 1672, and he arrived in Veracruz in September 1673. He delayed some time in Veracruz to look over the fortifications there, as Spain was then at war with France.

He arrived at Chapultepec November 16, 1673, and remained there three weeks for reasons of health before making his entry into Mexico City. He took possession of the government the night of November 20, but delayed exercising the functions of government. He finally made his solemn entry into Mexico City on December 8, 1673, and his government is dated from this date, rather than November 20. One of his few official acts was to lower the prices of cacao and maize.

Colón de Portugal's governorship would not last long, however, as he died on December 13 at 5 am, only five days after formally taking up the position. His term was the shortest of all the viceroys'. His funeral was conducted with great solemnity in the cathedral, where his remains were deposited in the chapel of Santo Cristo. Some historians claim that his remains were later moved to Spain, but others claim they are still in the cathedral.

On the day of his death, the Inquisitor Juan de Ortega delivered sealed instructions to the Audiencia that in the event of the death of Pedro Nuño Colón de Portugal, the government was to be transferred to Payo Enríquez de Rivera, archbishop of Mexico.

== Descendants ==
His first marriage, dated 8 February 1645, when he was 18, was to Isabel de la Cueva y Enriquez de Cabrera, daughter of Francisco Fernández de la Cueva, 7th Duke of Alburquerque.

They had a son named Pedro Manuel Colón de Portugal, 7th duke of Veragua, (1651–1710), a Knight of the Order of the Golden Fleece, 1675, Viceroy of Valencia, 1696, Viceroy of Sicily, 1696–1701, and Viceroy of Sardinia, 1706–1708.

This son, the 7th duke since 1673, married Teresa de Ayala Toledo y Fajardo de Mendoza, born around 1650, on 30 August 1674. A daughter of this 7th Duke, Catalina Ventura (1690–1739), sister of the 8th Duke of Veragua (also named Pedro Nuño), would in turn marry the famous James Fitz-James Stuart, 2nd Duke of Berwick, the Spanish Ambassador in Russia.

== Additional information ==
=== Sources ===
- García Purón, Manuel (1984). México y sus gobernantes (in Spanish). Vol. 1. Mexico City: Joaquín Porrua.
- Orozco Linares, Fernando (1985). Gobernantes de México (in Spanish). Mexico City: Panorama Editorial. ISBN 968-38-0260-5.
- Orozco Linares, Fernando (1988). Fechas Históricas de México (in Spanish). Mexico City: Panorama Editorial. ISBN 968-38-0046-7.
- Hobbs, Nicolas (2007). "Grandes de España" (in Spanish). Archived from the original on October 25, 2008.
- http://www.grandesp.org.uk/historia/gzas/arjona.htm

Government offices
Preceded by Antonio Sebastián de Toledo, 2nd Marquess of Mancera	Viceroy of New Spain; 1673	Succeeded by Payo Enríquez de Rivera
Military offices
Preceded by Álvaro Colón, 5th Duke of Veragua	Admiral of the Indies; 1636–1673	Succeeded by Pedro Manuel Colón de Portugal, 7th Duke of Veragua
Spanish nobility
Preceded by Álvaro Colón, 5th Duke of Veragua	Duke of Veragua; 1636–1673	Succeeded by Pedro Manuel Colón de Portugal, 7th Duke of Veragua
Preceded by Álvaro Colón, 5th Duke of Veragua	Marquess of Jamaica; 1636–1673	Succeeded by Pedro Manuel Colón de Portugal, 7th Duke of Veragua
Preceded by Catalina de Castro y Portugal, 5th Countess of Gelves	Count of Gelves; 1634–1673	Succeeded by Pedro Manuel Colón de Portugal, 7th Duke of Veragua
