= Cerro de Gorría =

Mountain in Spain

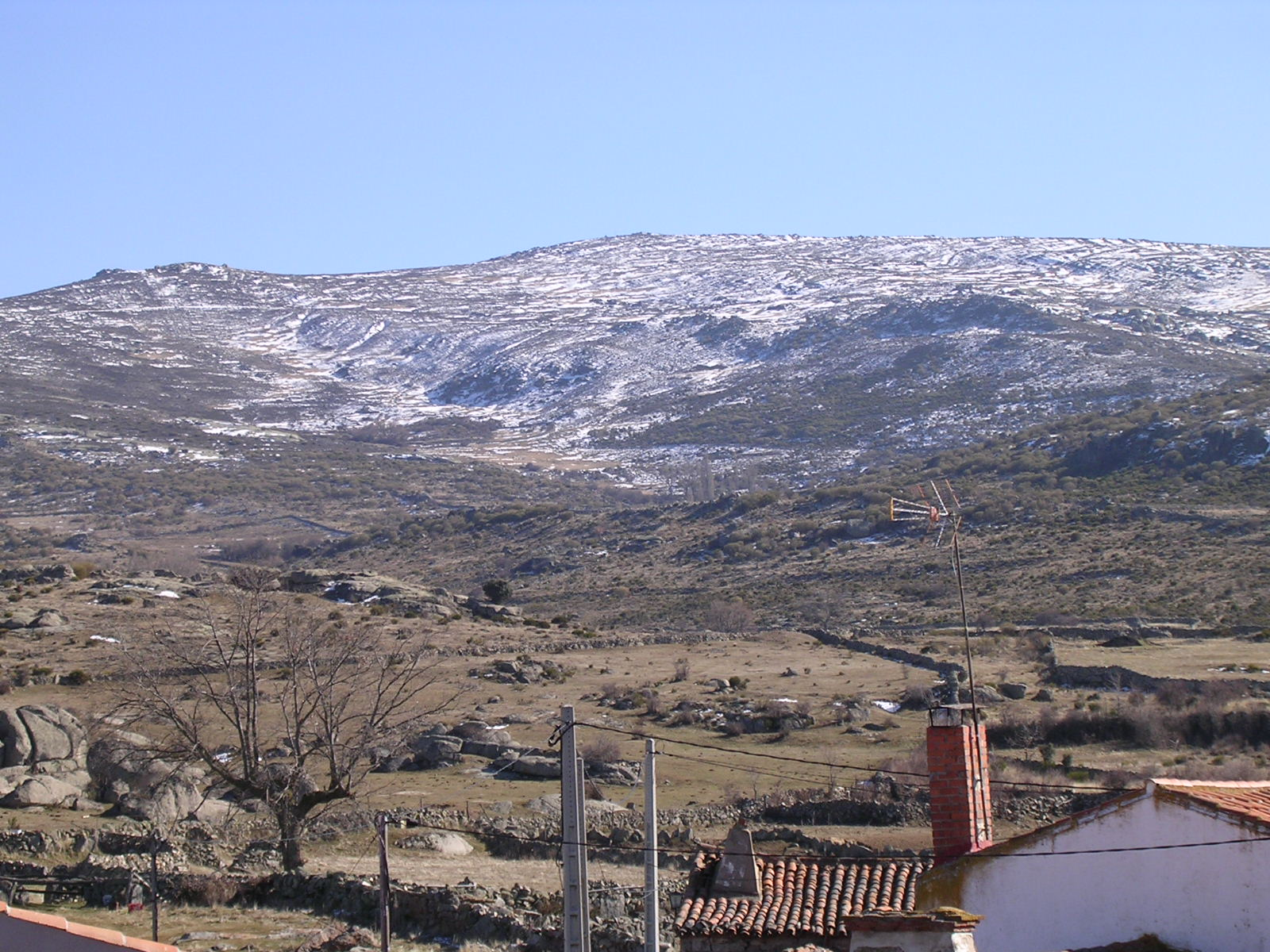
- Winter view from Pasarilla del Rebollar

Highest point
- Elevation: 1,708 m (5,604 ft)
- Prominence: 327 m (1,073 ft)
- Coordinates: 40°39′25″N 04°59′03″W

Geography
- Location within Spain
- Location: Ávila Province, Castile and León
- Parent range: Sierra de Ávila

Geology
- Mountain type: Granite

Climbing
- First ascent: ancestral
- Easiest route: hike

Cerro de Gorría is a 1.708 metres high mountain in Spain.

== Geography ==
The mountain is located in Ávila Province, in the southern part of the autonomous community of Castile and León. It's the highest peak of the Sierra de Ávila, and is visible from a large part of the province.

== Access to the summit ==
The summit can be accessed in one hour's walk from Pasarilla del Rebollar (1300 m, Valdecasa municipality). Its summit offers an interesting view on la Moraña, Amblés valley, Sierra Paramera, and la Serrota. On a clear day, Sierra de Guadarrama can be seen in the distance.

== See also ==
- Sistema Central
