= Amavida =

- municipality
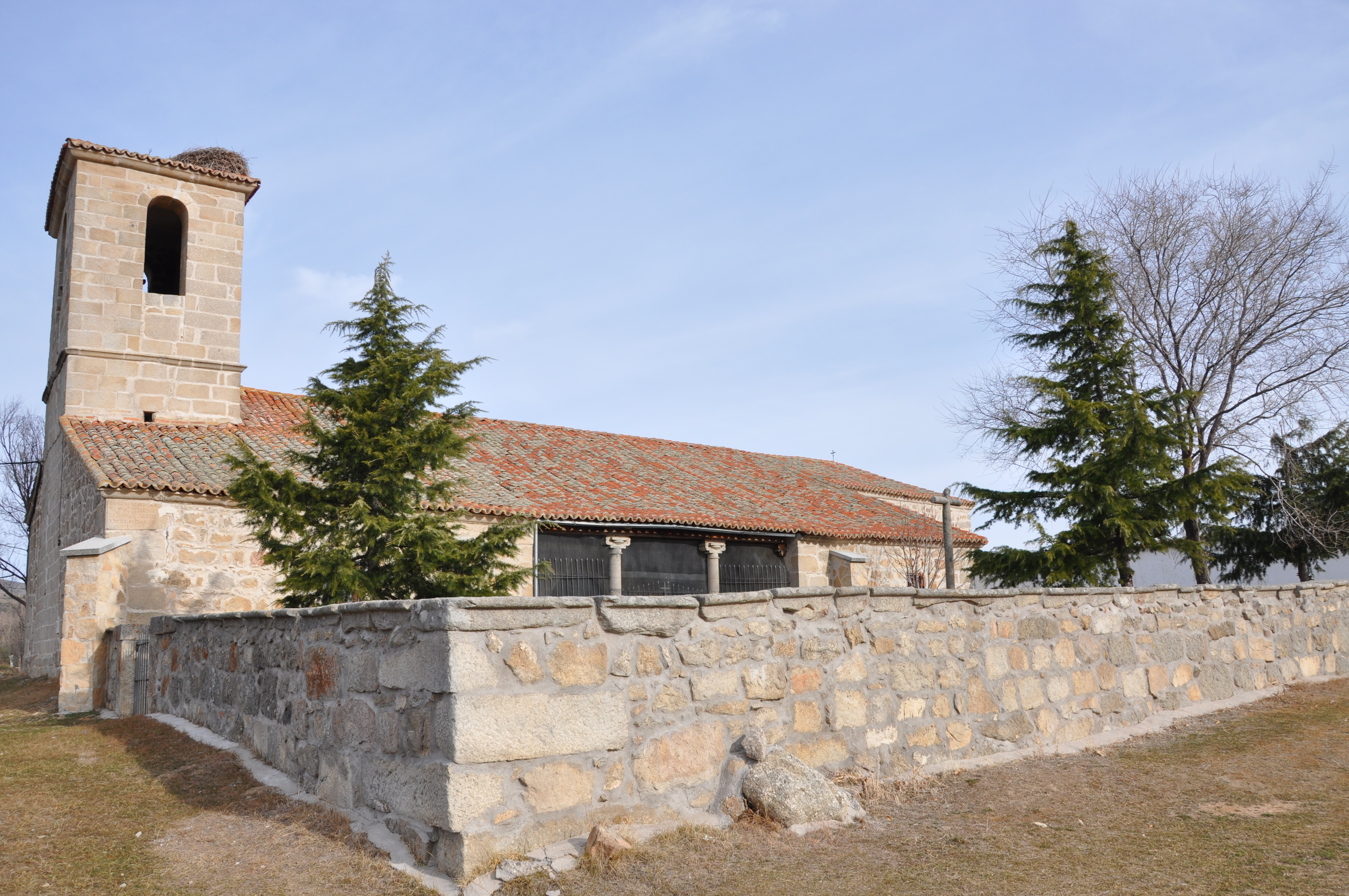
- Church of San Juan Bautista, Amavida, Ávila,
- Flag Coat of arms
- Extension of the municipal term within the province of Ávila

- Location in Spain. Amavida (Spain)
- Coordinates: 40°34′24″N 5°04′00″W
- Country: Spain
- Autonomous community: Castile and León
- Province: Ávila
- Municipality: Amavida

Area
  - Total: 15.02 km^{2} (5.80 sq mi)
- Elevation: 1,163 m (3,816 ft)

Population (2025-01-01)
  - Total: 131
  - Density: 8.72/km^{2} (22.6/sq mi)
- Time zone: UTC+1 (CET)
  - Summer (DST): UTC+2 (CEST)
- Website: Official website

Amavida is a municipality located in the province of Ávila, Castile and León, Spain. According to the 2025 census (INE), the municipality had a population of 131 inhabitants.

== Population ==
Historical population
Year	Pop.	±% p.a.
2023	135	—
2024	133	−1.48%
2025	131	−1.50%
Source: INE
