= Muñogalindo =

- municipality
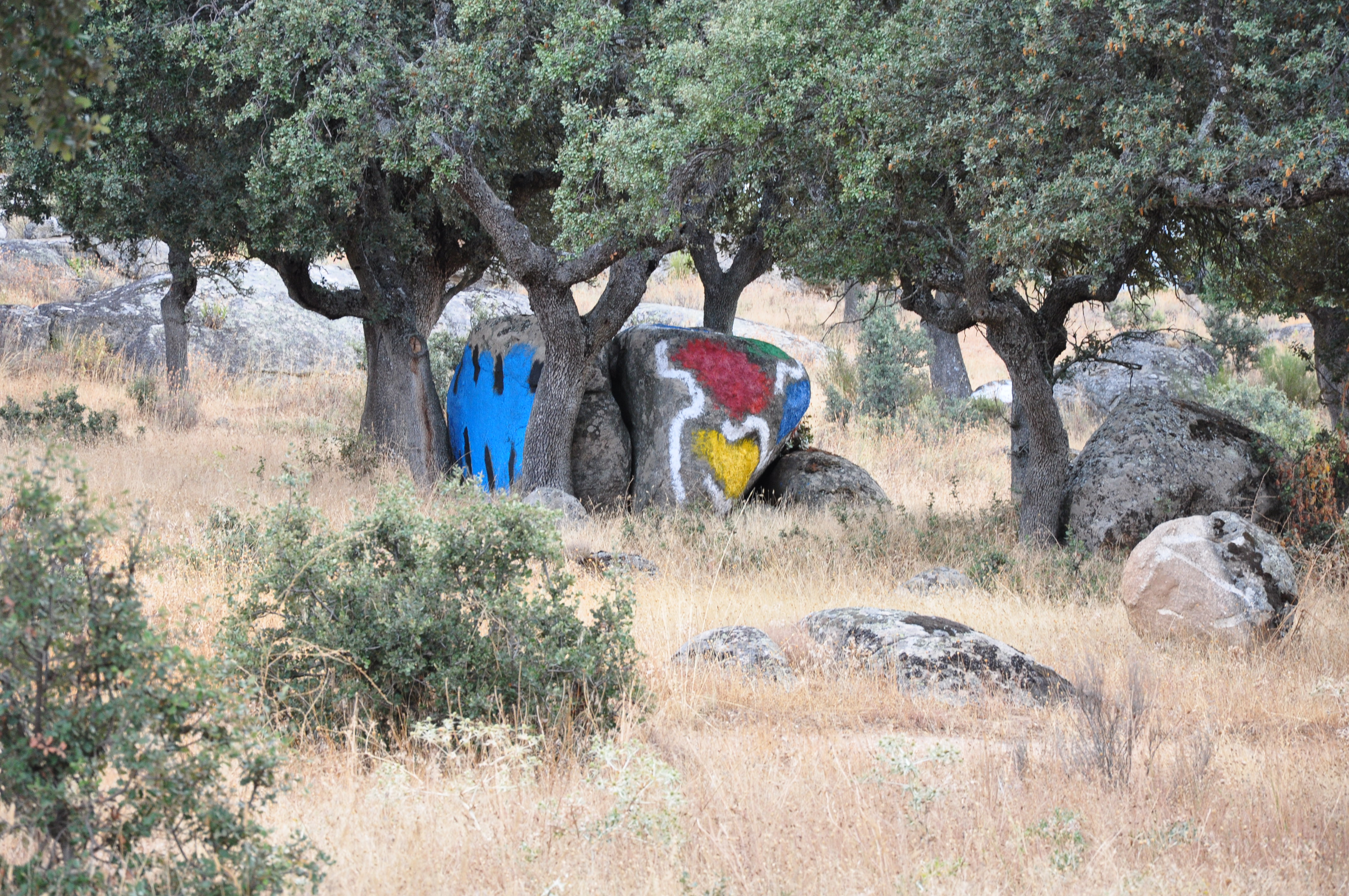
- Stones painted by Ibarrola, Garoza, Muñogalindo

- Flag Coat of arms

- Location in Spain. Muñogalindo (Spain)
- Coordinates: 40°36′09″N 4°53′42″W
- Country: Spain
- Autonomous community: Castile and León
- Province: Ávila
- Municipality: Muñogalindo

Area
  - Total: 18 km^{2} (6.9 sq mi)

Population (2025-01-01)
  - Total: 299
  - Density: 17/km^{2} (43/sq mi)
- Time zone: UTC+1 (CET)
  - Summer (DST): UTC+2 (CEST)
- Website: Official website

Muñogalindo is a municipality located in the province of Ávila, Castile and León, Spain.

== Population ==
Historical population
Year	Pop.	±% p.a.
2023	301	—
2024	300	−0.33%
2025	299	−0.33%
Source: INE
