= Vadillo de la Sierra =

- municipality
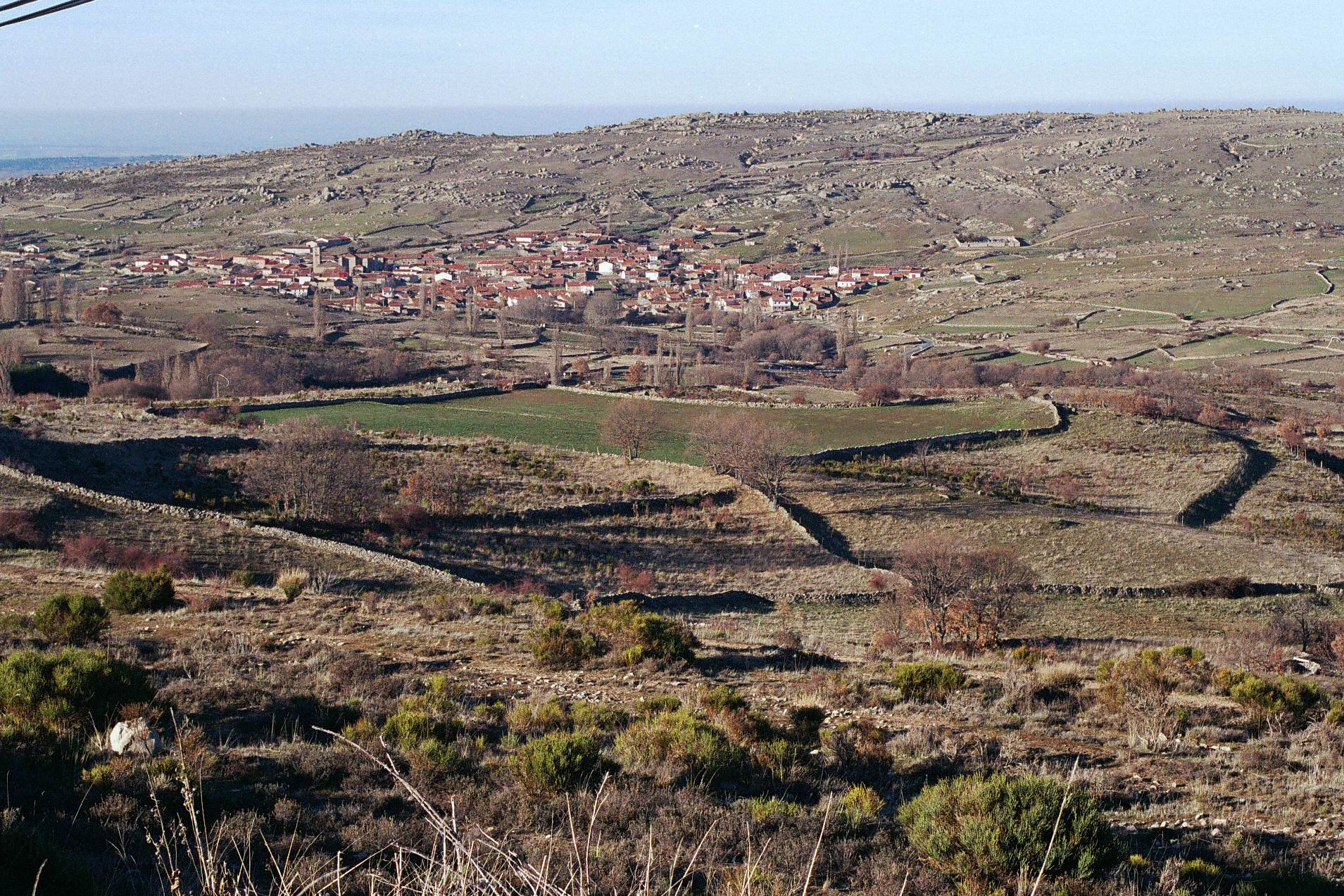
- Vadillo de la Sierra

- Location in Spain. Vadillo de la Sierra (Spain)
- Coordinates: 40°36′23″N 5°07′30″W
- Country: Spain
- Autonomous community: Castile and León
- Province: Ávila

Area
  - Total: 46 km^{2} (18 sq mi)

Population (2025-01-01)
  - Total: 50
  - Density: 1.1/km^{2} (2.8/sq mi)
- Time zone: UTC+1 (CET)
  - Summer (DST): UTC+2 (CEST)
- Website: Official website

Vadillo de la Sierra is a municipality located in the province of Ávila, Castile and León, Spain.

== Population ==
Historical population
| Year | Pop. | ±% p.a. |
|---|---|---|
| 2023 | 58 | — |
| 2024 | 51 | −12.07% |
| 2025 | 50 | −1.96% |
Source: INE
