= Sierra de Ávila =

Mountain range

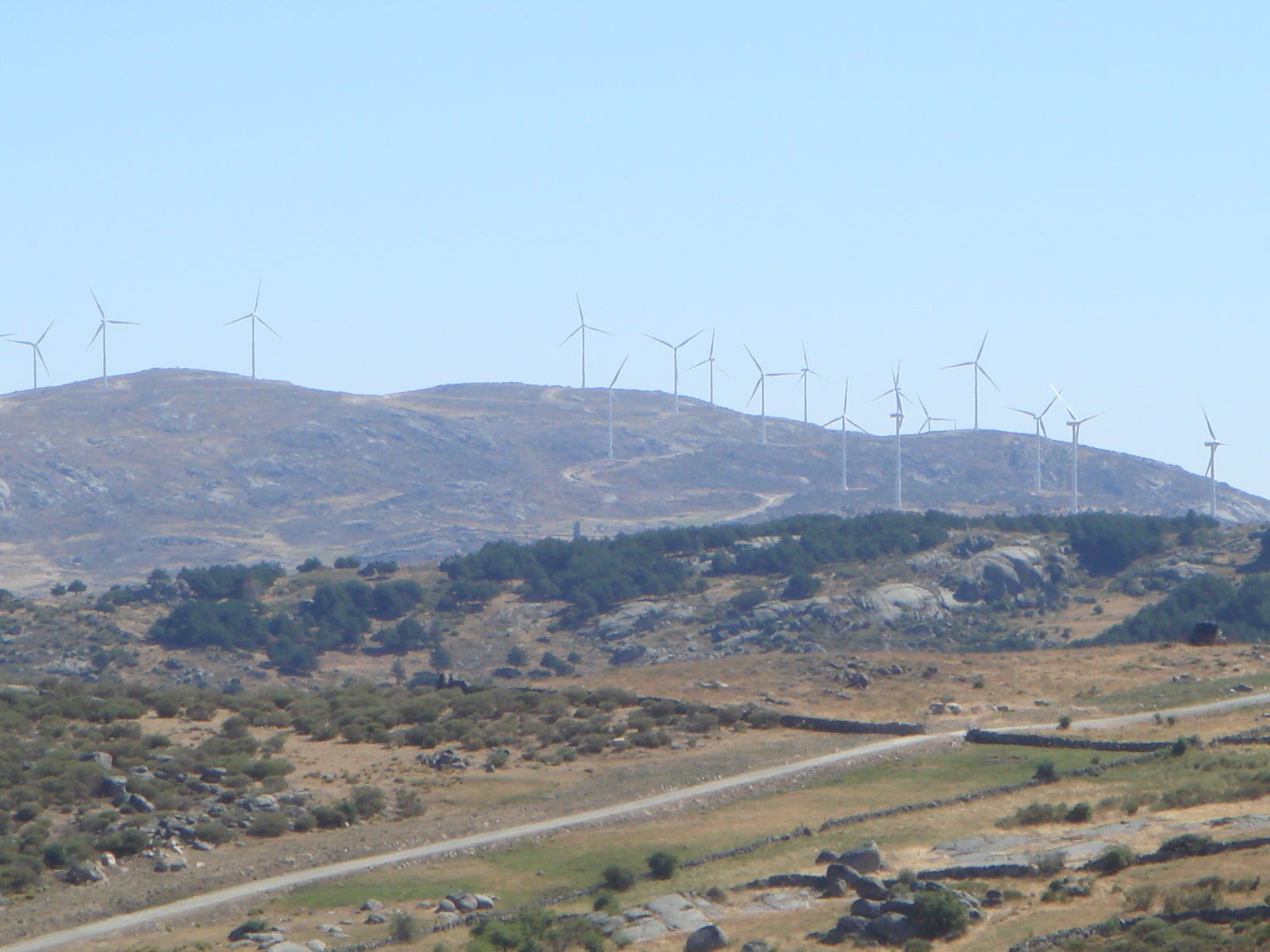
- Cerro de Gorría

Highest point
- Elevation: 1,708 m (5,604 ft)
- Coordinates: 40°39′25″N 4°59′03″W

Geography
- Location: Iberian Peninsula, Spain

Geology
- Rock type: Granite

The Sierra de Ávila is a mountain range in the centre of the Iberian Peninsula. Its highest point is Cerro de Gorría, at 1708 metres.

== See also ==
- Sistema Central
