= San Juan del Olmo =

- municipality
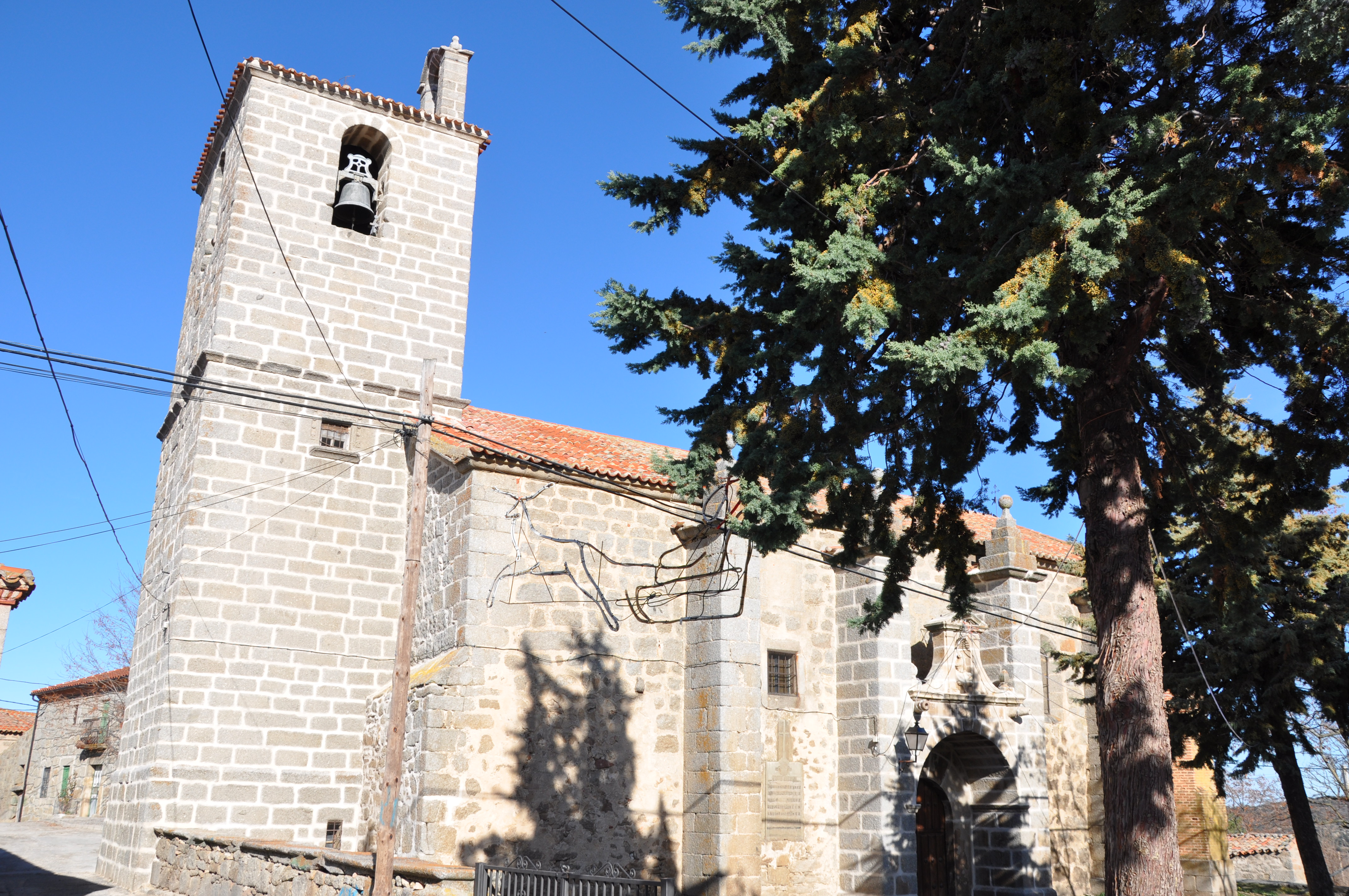
- Bell tower of the parish church of San Juan Bautista, San Juan del Olmo, Ávila

- Location in Spain. San Juan del Olmo (Spain)
- Coordinates: 40°39′10″N 5°02′59″W
- Country: Spain
- Autonomous community: Castile and León
- Province: Ávila
- Municipality: San Juan del Olmo

Area
  - Total: 30 km^{2} (12 sq mi)

Population (2025-01-01)
  - Total: 73
  - Density: 2.4/km^{2} (6.3/sq mi)
- Time zone: UTC+1 (CET)
  - Summer (DST): UTC+2 (CEST)
- Website: Official website

San Juan del Olmo is a municipality located in the province of Ávila, Castile and León, Spain.

== Population ==
Historical population
Year	Pop.	±% p.a.
2023	80	—
2024	81	+1.25%
2025	73	−9.88%
Source: INE
