= Autovía BU-30 =

Autovía BU-30
- Circunvalación de Burgos

Route information
- Part of E5 / E80
- Maintained by Government of Spain
- Length: 37.5 km (23.3 mi)

Location
- Country: Spain

Highway system
- Highways in Spain; Autopistas and autovías; National Roads

The Autovía BU-30 is a Spanish ring road that goes around the city of Burgos. Its principal role is that cars from Madrid, Valladolid, León, Santander, Logroño or Vitoria don't need to cross Burgos. It has a total length of 37.5 km, and some sections of the autovía are also part of European route E05 or European route E80

== Sections ==
Nomenclature	Section	Opening year	Length (in km)
BU-30	A-1 Landa junction to A-62 Villagonzalo Pedernales	1990	1,8
BU-30	A-62 Villagonzalo Pedernales to A-231 Villalbilla de Burgos	2006	4
BU-30	A-231 Villalbilla de Burgos to A-73 Quintanadueñas	2016	9,1
BU-30	A-73 Quintanadueñas to A-73 Villatoro	2015	3,5
BU-30	A-73 Villatoro to N-I Villafría	2015	7,1
A-1 / BU-30	N-I Villafría to AP-1	1984	5
A-1 / BU-30 / E5 / E80	AP-1 to A-1 Landa junction	1984	7,2
