= Autoroute 73 =

Autoroute 73 may refer to:

- A73 autoroute, in France
- Quebec Autoroute 73, in Quebec, Canada

== See also ==
- A73 roads
- List of highways numbered 73
