= 2024 Vuelta a Burgos Feminas =

2024 UCI Women's World Tour, race 17 of 27

Race details
- Dates: 16–19 May 2024
- Stages: 4
- Distance: 490 km (300 mi)
- Winning time: 12h 19' 41"

Results
Jersey awarded to the overall winner	Winner	Demi Vollering (NED)	(Team SD Worx–Protime)
	Second	Évita Muzic (FRA)	(FDJ–Suez)
	Third	Karlijn Swinkels (NED)	(UAE Team ADQ)
Jersey awarded to the points classification winner	Points	Demi Vollering (NED)	(Team SD Worx–Protime)
Jersey awarded to the mountains classification winner	Mountains	Demi Vollering (NED)	(Team SD Worx–Protime)
Jersey awarded to the youth classification winner	Youth	Shirin van Anrooij (NED)	(Lidl–Trek)
	Team	(Germany) Canyon//SRAM	

The 2024 Vuelta a Burgos Feminas was a Spanish women's cycle stage race held in the Province of Burgos in northern Spain from 16 to 19 May. It was the ninth edition of Vuelta a Burgos Feminas, and the 17th event of the 2024 UCI Women's World Tour.

The race was won by Dutch rider Demi Vollering of Team SD Worx–Protime for the second time, after wins on stages 2 and 4. Vollering also won the points and mountains classifications. The youth classification was won by Shirin van Anrooij of Lidl–Trek, and the team classification was won by Canyon–SRAM.

== Teams ==
Ten UCI Women's WorldTeams and ten UCI Women's Continental Teams took part in the race.

UCI Women's WorldTeams

- Canyon//SRAM
- FDJ–Suez
- Fenix–Deceuninck
- Human Powered Health
- Lidl–Trek
- Liv AlUla Jayco
- Movistar Team
- Roland
- Team dsm–firmenich PostNL
- Team SD Worx–Protime
- UAE Team ADQ
- Uno-X Mobility
- Visma–Lease a Bike

UCI Women's Continental Teams

- Bepink–Bongioanni
- Cofidis
- EF Education–Cannondale
- Eneicat–CMTeam
- Laboral Kutxa–Fundación Euskadi
- Primeau Vélo - Groupe Abadie
- Team Komugi–Grand Est

== Route ==
Stage characteristics and winners
Stage	Date	Course	Distance	Type	Stage winner
1	16 May	Villagonzalo Pedernales to Burgos	123 km (76 mi)	Hilly stage	Lotta Henttala (FIN)
2	17 May	Briviesca to Alto de Rosales	123 km (76 mi)	Hilly stage	Demi Vollering (NED)
3	18 May	Roa de Duero to Melgar de Fernamental	122 km (76 mi)	Flat stage	Lorena Wiebes (NED)
4	19 May	Peñaranda de Duero to Canicosa de la Sierra	122 km (76 mi)	Mountain stage	Demi Vollering (NED)
Total			490 km (300 mi)		

== Stages ==
=== Stage 1 ===
16 May 2024 — Villagonzalo Pedernales to Burgos, 123 km (76 mi)

Stage 1 Result
Rank	Rider	Team	Time
1	Lotta Henttala (FIN)	EF Education–Cannondale	3h 02' 33"
2	Carina Schrempf (AUT)	Fenix–Deceuninck	+ 0"
3	Lorena Wiebes (NED)	Team SD Worx–Protime	+ 0"
4	Elise Chabbey (SUI)	Canyon//SRAM	+ 0"
5	Ruby Roseman-Gannon (AUS)	Liv AlUla Jayco	+ 0"
6	Karlijn Swinkels (NED)	UAE Team ADQ	+ 0"
7	Letizia Borghesi (ITA)	EF Education–Cannondale	+ 0"
8	Soraya Paladin (ITA)	Canyon//SRAM	+ 0"
9	Megan Jastrab (USA)	Team dsm–firmenich PostNL	+ 0"
10	Sarah Roy (AUS)	Cofidis	+ 0"

General classification after Stage 1
Rank	Rider	Team	Time
1	Lotta Henttala (FIN)	EF Education–Cannondale	3h 02' 23"
2	Carina Schrempf (AUT)	Fenix–Deceuninck	+ 4"
3	Lorena Wiebes (NED)	Team SD Worx–Protime	+ 6"
4	Katrine Aalerud (NOR)	Uno-X Mobility	+ 7"
5	Karlijn Swinkels (NED)	UAE Team ADQ	+ 8"
6	Elise Chabbey (SUI)	Canyon//SRAM	+ 10"
7	Ruby Roseman-Gannon (AUS)	Liv AlUla Jayco	+ 10"
8	Letizia Borghesi (ITA)	EF Education–Cannondale	+ 10"
9	Soraya Paladin (ITA)	Canyon//SRAM	+ 10"
10	Megan Jastrab (USA)	Team dsm–firmenich PostNL	+ 10"

=== Stage 2 ===
17 May 2024 — Briviesca to Alto de Rosales, 123 km (76 mi)

Stage 2 Result
Rank	Rider	Team	Time
1	Demi Vollering (NED)	Team SD Worx–Protime	3h 05' 23"
2	Évita Muzic (FRA)	FDJ–Suez	+ 4"
3	Karlijn Swinkels (NED)	UAE Team ADQ	+ 9"
4	Noemi Rüegg (SUI)	EF Education–Cannondale	+ 13"
5	Elise Chabbey (SUI)	Canyon//SRAM	+ 13"
6	Silvia Persico (ITA)	UAE Team ADQ	+ 19"
7	Letizia Borghesi (ITA)	EF Education–Cannondale	+ 19"
8	Soraya Paladin (ITA)	Canyon//SRAM	+ 19"
9	Liane Lippert (GER)	Movistar Team	+ 19"
10	Ella Wyllie (NZL)	Liv AlUla Jayco	+ 19"

General classification after Stage 2
Rank	Rider	Team	Time
1	Demi Vollering (NED)	Team SD Worx–Protime	6h 07' 46"
2	Évita Muzic (FRA)	FDJ–Suez	+ 8"
3	Karlijn Swinkels (NED)	UAE Team ADQ	+ 11"
4	Elise Chabbey (SUI)	Canyon//SRAM	+ 23"
5	Noemi Rüegg (SUI)	EF Education–Cannondale	+ 23"
6	Soraya Paladin (ITA)	Canyon//SRAM	+ 26"
7	Letizia Borghesi (ITA)	EF Education–Cannondale	+ 29"
8	Shirin van Anrooij (NED)	Lidl–Trek	+ 29"
9	Silvia Persico (ITA)	UAE Team ADQ	+ 29"
10	Liane Lippert (GER)	Movistar Team	+ 29"

=== Stage 3 ===
18 May 2024 — Roa de Duero to Melgar de Fernamental, 122 km (76 mi)

Stage 3 Result
Rank	Rider	Team	Time
1	Lorena Wiebes (NED)	Team SD Worx–Protime	2h 54' 21"
2	Clara Copponi (FRA)	Lidl–Trek	+ 0"
3	Maike van der Duin (NED)	Canyon//SRAM	+ 0"
4	Maria Giulia Confalonieri (ITA)	Uno-X Mobility	+ 0"
5	Alexandra Manly (AUS)	Liv AlUla Jayco	+ 0"
6	Megan Jastrab (USA)	Team dsm–firmenich PostNL	+ 0"
7	Tereza Neumanova (CZE)	UAE Team ADQ	+ 0"
8	Silvia Zanardi (ITA)	Human Powered Health	+ 0"
9	Letizia Borghesi (ITA)	EF Education–Cannondale	+ 0"
10	Lotta Henttala (FIN)	EF Education–Cannondale	+ 0"

General classification after Stage 3
Rank	Rider	Team	Time
1	Demi Vollering (NED)	Team SD Worx–Protime	9h 02' 07"
2	Évita Muzic (FRA)	FDJ–Suez	+ 8"
3	Karlijn Swinkels (NED)	UAE Team ADQ	+ 11"
4	Elise Chabbey (SUI)	Canyon//SRAM	+ 23"
5	Noemi Rüegg (SUI)	EF Education–Cannondale	+ 23"
6	Soraya Paladin (ITA)	Canyon//SRAM	+ 26"
7	Letizia Borghesi (ITA)	EF Education–Cannondale	+ 29"
8	Liane Lippert (GER)	Movistar Team	+ 29"
9	Silvia Persico (ITA)	UAE Team ADQ	+ 29"
10	Ella Wyllie (NZL)	Liv AlUla Jayco	+ 29"

=== Stage 4 ===
19 May 2024 — Peñaranda de Duero to Canicosa de la Sierra, 122 km (76 mi)

Stage 4 Result
Rank	Rider	Team	Time
1	Demi Vollering (NED)	Team SD Worx–Protime	3h 17' 44"
2	Lucinda Brand (NED)	Lidl–Trek	+ 51"
3	Évita Muzic (FRA)	FDJ–Suez	+ 1' 14"
4	Karlijn Swinkels (NED)	UAE Team ADQ	+ 1' 38"
5	Elise Chabbey (SUI)	Canyon//SRAM	+ 1' 40"
6	Shirin van Anrooij (NED)	Lidl–Trek	+ 1' 42"
7	Noemi Rüegg (SUI)	EF Education–Cannondale	+ 2' 50"
8	Neve Bradbury (AUS)	Canyon//SRAM	+ 2' 51"
9	Inge van der Heijden (NED)	Fenix–Deceuninck	+ 2' 51"
10	Léa Curinier (FRA)	FDJ–Suez	+ 2' 51"

General classification after Stage 4
Rank	Rider	Team	Time
1	Demi Vollering (NED)	Team SD Worx–Protime	12h 19' 41"
2	Évita Muzic (FRA)	FDJ–Suez	+ 1' 28"
3	Karlijn Swinkels (NED)	UAE Team ADQ	+ 1' 59"
4	Elise Chabbey (SUI)	Canyon//SRAM	+ 2' 13"
5	Shirin van Anrooij (NED)	Lidl–Trek	+ 2' 21"
6	Noemi Rüegg (SUI)	EF Education–Cannondale	+ 3' 23"
7	Soraya Paladin (ITA)	Canyon//SRAM	+ 3' 27"
8	Liane Lippert (GER)	Movistar Team	+ 3' 30"
9	Ella Wyllie (NZL)	Liv AlUla Jayco	+ 3' 30"
10	Maud Oudeman (NED)	Visma–Lease a Bike	+ 3' 30"

== Classification leadership table ==
Classification leadership by stage
Stage	Winner	General classification	Points classification	Mountains classification	Young rider classification	Team classification
1	Lotta Henttala	Lotta Henttala	Lotta Henttala	Katrine Aalerud	Megan Jastrab	EF Education–Cannondale
2	Demi Vollering	Demi Vollering	Karlijn Swinkels	Katrine Aalerud	Shirin van Anrooij	Canyon//SRAM
3	Lorena Wiebes	Demi Vollering	Lorena Wiebes	Katrine Aalerud	Ella Wyllie	Canyon//SRAM
4	Demi Vollering	Demi Vollering	Demi Vollering	Demi Vollering	Shirin van Anrooij	Canyon//SRAM
Final		Demi Vollering	Demi Vollering	Demi Vollering	Shirin van Anrooij	Canyon–SRAM

== Classification standings ==
Legend
Denotes the winner of the general classification	Denotes the winner of the mountains classification
Denotes the winner of the points classification	Denotes the winner of the young rider classification

=== General classification ===
Final general classification (1–10)
Rank	Rider	Team	Time
1	Demi Vollering (NED)	Team SD Worx–Protime	12h 19' 41"
2	Évita Muzic (FRA)	FDJ–Suez	+ 1' 28"
3	Karlijn Swinkels (NED)	UAE Team ADQ	+ 1' 59"
4	Elise Chabbey (SUI)	Canyon//SRAM	+ 2' 13"
5	Shirin van Anrooij (NED)	Lidl–Trek	+ 2' 21"
6	Noemi Rüegg (SUI)	EF Education–Cannondale	+ 3' 23"
7	Soraya Paladin (ITA)	Canyon//SRAM	+ 3' 27"
8	Liane Lippert (GER)	Movistar Team	+ 3' 30"
9	Ella Wyllie (NZL)	Liv AlUla Jayco	+ 3' 30"
10	Maud Oudeman (NED)	Visma–Lease a Bike	+ 3' 30"

=== Points classification ===
Final points classification (1–10)
Rank	Rider	Team	Points
1	Demi Vollering (NED)	Team SD Worx–Protime	50
2	Lorena Wiebes (NED)	Team SD Worx–Protime	41
3	Karlijn Swinkels (NED)	UAE Team ADQ	40
4	Elise Chabbey (SUI)	Canyon//SRAM	38
5	Évita Muzic (FRA)	FDJ–Suez	36
6	Lotta Henttala (FIN)	EF Education–Cannondale	31
7	Letizia Borghesi (ITA)	EF Education–Cannondale	25
8	Noemi Rüegg (SUI)	EF Education–Cannondale	23
9	Soraya Paladin (ITA)	Canyon//SRAM	20
10	Carina Schrempf (AUT)	Fenix–Deceuninck	20

=== Mountains classification ===
Final mountains classification (1–10)
Rank	Rider	Team	Points
1	Demi Vollering (NED)	Team SD Worx–Protime	26
2	Évita Muzic (FRA)	FDJ–Suez	19
3	Claire Steels (GBR)	Movistar Team	16
4	Karlijn Swinkels (NED)	UAE Team ADQ	14
5	Elise Chabbey (SUI)	Canyon//SRAM	10
6	Lucinda Brand (NED)	Lidl–Trek	10
7	Lorena Wiebes (NED)	Team SD Worx–Protime	6
8	Dominika Włodarczyk (POL)	UAE Team ADQ	6
9	Giorgia Vettorello (ITA)	Roland	6
10	Noemi Rüegg (SUI)	EF Education–Cannondale	5

=== Young rider classification ===
Final young rider classification (1–10)
Rank	Rider	Team	Time
1	Shirin van Anrooij (NED)	Lidl–Trek	12h 22' 02"
2	Ella Wyllie (NZL)	Liv AlUla Jayco	+ 1' 09"
3	Maud Oudeman (NED)	Visma–Lease a Bike	+ 1' 09"
4	Rosita Reijnhout (NED)	Visma–Lease a Bike	+ 1' 18"
5	Solbjørk Minke Anderson (DEN)	Uno-X Mobility	+ 1' 29"
6	Alice Towers (GBR)	Canyon//SRAM	+ 1' 40"
7	Henrietta Christie (NZL)	Human Powered Health	+ 2' 06"
8	Linda Riedmann (GER)	Visma–Lease a Bike	+ 3' 24"
9	Neve Bradbury (AUS)	Canyon//SRAM	+ 3' 25"
10	Cristina Tonetti (ITA)	Laboral Kutxa–Fundación Euskadi	+ 5' 02"

=== Teams classification ===
Final team classification (1–10)
Rank	Team	Time
1	(Germany) Canyon//SRAM	37h 08' 47"
2	(France) FDJ–Suez	+ 46"
3	(United Arab Emirates) UAE Team ADQ	+ 1' 04"
4	(United States) Lidl–Trek	+ 1' 58"
5	(Netherlands) Visma–Lease a Bike	+ 2' 02"
6	(Spain) Movistar Team	+ 2' 16"
7	(Belgium) Fenix–Deceuninck	+ 3' 00"
8	(Australia) Liv AlUla Jayco	+ 3' 43"
9	(United States) EF Education–Cannondale	+ 4' 51"
10	(Netherlands) Team SD Worx–Protime	+ 6' 16"

== See also ==
- 2024 in women's road cycling
