= Autovía SA-20 =

Motorway in Spain

Autovía SA-20
- Southern Ring of Salamanca

Route information
- Length: 3.5 km (2.2 mi)

Major junctions
- From: A-50 Salamanca
- To: A-66 Salamanca

Location
- Country: Spain

Highway system
- Highways in Spain; Autopistas and autovías; National Roads

The Autovía SA-20 is a highway of approximately 3,5 kilometers in central Spain between Autovía A-50 and Autovía A-66.

Because it is not the doubling of the N501 it replaces, it is built as a new road.

== Departures ==
Round South of Salamanca SA-20
Diagram	Direction A-66 (ascendant)					Direction A-50 (descendant)					Incidents
Diagram	Max Speed	Factor	Departure			Departure			Factor	Max Speed	Incidents
Diagram	Max Speed	Factor	Num.	Dir.	Name	Name	Dir.	Num.	Factor	Max Speed	Incidents
			CL-510 S. Area / A-50 + A-50 -		SA-20 Industrial park El Montalvo; CL-512; All Directions; CL-517; All Directions; A-62 E-80 N-620; All Directions; A-66 E-803 N-630; All Directions			92			
			CL-510 S. Area / A-50 + A-50 -		CL-510; Alba de Tormes			92			
			CL-510 S. Area / A-50 + A-50 -		A-50; Ávila; Madrid			92			
			CL-510 S. Area / A-50 + A-50 -		Shopping area Santa Marta de Tormes			92			
			CL-510 S. Area / A-50 + A-50 -		A-50 Salamanca; N-501; All Directions			92			
			93		Salamanca; Industrial park El Montalvo I			93			Ninguna
			93		SA-20 CL-512; All Directions; CL-517; All Directions; A-62 E-80 N-620; All Directions; A-66 E-803 N-630; All Directions			93			Ninguna
			93		Carbajosa de la Sagrada; Industrial park El Montalvo II; Industrial park El Montalvo III			93			Ninguna
			93		SA-20 A-50 N-501; All Directions; CL-510; All Directions			93			Ninguna
			SA-20; Round South of Salamanca			SA-20; SPEED CONTROL	PK 93,5				
			94		N-630; Salamanca; Zamora			95			Ninguna
			94		SA-20 A-66; Zamora; CL-517; All Directions; CL-512; All Directions; A-62 E-80 N-620; All Directions			95			Ninguna
			94		N-630 A-66 E-803 N-630; Cáceres; Industrial park El Montalvo III			95			Ninguna
			94		SA-20 A-50 N-501; All Directions; Industrial park El Montalvo I Industrial park El Montalvo II; CL-510; All Directions			95			Ninguna
			96		CL-512; Salamanca		CL-512+ S. Road / A66 CL-512 -				
			96		A-66; Zamora CL-517; All Directions; A-62 E-80 N-620; All Directions		CL-512+ S. Road / A-62 CL-512 -				
			96		Service Road		CL-512+ S. Road / A-66 CL-512 -				
			96		CL-512; Aldeatejada; Vecinos		CL-512+ S. Road / A66 CL-512 -				
			96		SA-20 A-50 N-501; All Directions; A-66 E-803 N-630; Caceres; Industrial park El Montalvo; CL-510; All Directions		CL-512+ S. Road / A-66 CL-512 -				
