= Route 75 (disambiguation) =

Route 75 may refer to:

- London Buses route 75
- Melbourne tram route 75, Vermont South to Spencer Street, Melbourne.
- SEPTA Route 75, Philadelphia

== See also ==
- List of highways numbered 75
