= Speed limits in Spain =

Border sign displaying the general speed limits for cars and motorcycles

Spain has different speed limits for every kind of road and vehicle.

== History of changes ==
There were no speed limits on Spanish motorways until a generic limit of 130 km/h was instated in 1973 in order to save fuel during the 1973 energy crisis. It was lowered to 100 km/h to prevent accidents, but raised again in 1992 to 120 km/h. Proposals to raise the speed limit to 130 km/h have so far been rejected.

In 2011 from 7 March through 30 June, in order to save fuel due to the ongoing Arab Spring, the maximum speed limit in Spain was reduced from 120 km/h to 110 km/h.

On 29 January 2019, the speed limit was reduced from 100 km/h to 90 km/h on single-lane rural roads.

== Standard motorway speed limit ==
On Motorways and autovías:

- 120 km/h for cars and motorbikes
- 100 km/h for buses and vans
- 90 km/h for trucks and vehicles with a trailer weighing 750 kg or less
- 80 km/h for vehicles with a trailer weighing more than 750 kg

Bicycles and mopeds are not allowed to access a motorway, although only bicycles (not mopeds) may ride on the shoulders of autovías.

== Standard interurban rural roads speed limit ==
- 90 km/h for cars, buses and motorbikes
- 80 km/h for vans, trucks and vehicles with a trailer, or campers weighing more than 3,500 kg
- 45 km/h for bicycles and mopeds

== Specific speed limits ==
On all non-urban roads and motorways, school buses and vehicles containing contaminant, explosive or flammable materials must decrease their speed limit by 10 km/h.

On motorways, a minimum speed limit of 60 km/h is mandatory for all vehicles. Minimum speeds on other roads are one half of the generic speed limit for every vehicle. If a posted speed limit sign is below this value, the minimum speed is the posted limit minus 10 km/h.

No legal sanction is established for driving at a measured speed within 3 to 10 percent over the speed limit, depending on the specific error margin of the radar.

== Built-up areas ==
Built-up areas:

- 50 km/h on urban roads with two lanes per direction
- 30 km/h on urban roads with one lane per direction
- 20 km/h on urban roads shared with pedestrians
