= Autovía A-50 =

Motorway in Spain

Autovía A-50
- Autovía Ávila - Salamanca

Route information
- Length: 100 km (62 mi)

Major junctions
- From: Ávila
- To: Salamanca

Location
- Country: Spain

Highway system
- Highways in Spain; Autopistas and autovías; National Roads

The Autovía A-50 (also known as Autovía Ávila - Salamanca and Autovía de la Cultura) is an autovía in the community of Castile and León, Spain. It starts at the Autovía A-51 at Ávila and ends on the southern outskirts of Salamanca, close to the Autovía A-62 and the Autovía A-66, while running parallel to the N-501 road. It was built between 2006 and 2009.
