= SA-20 =

SA-20 or SA20 may refer to:

- SA20, a franchise cricket tournament held in South Africa
- SA-20A/B Gargoyle, a Soviet surface-to-air missile in the S-300 series
- Autovía SA-20, a motorway in Spain
