= List of highways numbered 74 =

The following highways have been numbered 74:

== Canada ==
- Newfoundland and Labrador Route 74

== Greece ==
- EO74 road

== India ==
- National Highway 74 (India)

== Korea, South ==
- National Route 74

== Mexico ==
- Mexican Federal Highway 74

== New Zealand ==
- New Zealand State Highway 74
  - New Zealand State Highway 74A

== Philippines ==
- N74 highway (Philippines)

== Taiwan ==
- Prov 74 Provincial Highway 74 (Taiwan), the longest provincial highway in Taiwan.

== United Kingdom ==
- M74 motorway
- A74 road

== United States ==
- Interstate 74
- U.S. Route 74
- Alabama State Route 74
  - County Route 74 (Lee County, Alabama)
- Arizona State Route 74
  - Arizona State Route 74 (former)
- Arkansas Highway 74
- California State Route 74
- Colorado State Highway 74
- Connecticut Route 74
- Florida State Road 74 (former)
  - County Road 74 (Charlotte County, Florida)
  - County Road 74 (Glades County, Florida)
- Georgia State Route 74
- Idaho State Highway 74
- Illinois Route 74 (former)
- Iowa Highway 74 (1920–1941) (former)
- K-74 (Kansas highway)
- Kentucky Route 74
- Louisiana Highway 74
  - Louisiana State Route 74 (former)
- Maryland Route 74 (former)
- M-74 (Michigan highway)
- Minnesota State Highway 74
  - County Road 74 (Dakota County, Minnesota)
- Missouri Route 74
- Nebraska Highway 74
- Nevada State Route 74 (former)
- New Jersey Route 74 (former)
  - County Route 74 (Bergen County, New Jersey)
- New Mexico State Road 74
- New York State Route 74
  - County Route 74 (Dutchess County, New York)
  - County Route 74 (Herkimer County, New York)
  - County Route 74 (Madison County, New York)
  - County Route 74A (Oneida County, New York)
  - County Route 74 (Rensselaer County, New York)
  - County Route 74 (Rockland County, New York)
  - County Route 74 (Schenectady County, New York)
  - County Route 74 (Suffolk County, New York)
  - County Route 74 (Sullivan County, New York)
  - County Route 74 (Washington County, New York)
    - County Route 74A (Washington County, New York)
- North Carolina Highway 74 (temporary)
- North Carolina Highway 74 (1921-1934) (former)
- Ohio State Route 74 (1923) (former)
- Oklahoma State Highway 74
  - Oklahoma State Highway 74A (former)
  - Oklahoma State Highway 74B
  - Oklahoma State Highway 74C
  - Oklahoma State Highway 74D
  - Oklahoma State Highway 74E
  - Oklahoma State Highway 74F
- Oregon Route 74
- Pennsylvania Route 74
- Tennessee State Route 74
- Texas State Highway 74 (one former highway; one proposed highway)
  - Texas State Highway 74A (former)
  - Texas State Highway Spur 74
  - Farm to Market Road 74
  - Texas Park Road 74
- Utah State Route 74
- Vermont Route 74
- Virginia State Route 74
- West Virginia Route 74
- Wisconsin Highway 74
- Wyoming Highway 74

Territories

- U.S. Virgin Islands Highway 74

== See also ==
- A74 (disambiguation)

Preceded by 73	Lists of highways 74	Succeeded by 75
