= Autopista AP-51 =

Villacastín to Ávila motorway

Autopista AP-51
- Autopista Ávila - Villacastín

Route information
- Length: 24 km (15 mi)

Major junctions
- From: Villacastín
- To: Ávila

Location
- Country: Spain

Highway system
- Highways in Spain; Autopistas and autovías; National Roads

The Autopista AP-51 (also known as Autopista Ávila - Villacastín and Conexión Ávila) is an autopista in the community of Castile and León, Spain. Opened in late 2002, it runs for 24 kilometres (15 mi) between the Autopista AP-6 at the village of Villacastín, in the province of Segovia, and the eastern outskirts of the city of Ávila. It runs parallel to the N-110. As a toll road, it is operated by the Abertis Group.

Upon reaching Ávila, the highway then runs for a further 9 kilometres (5.6 mi) as an autovía, the A-51, forming a partial beltway around the north of Ávila and connecting with the Autovía A-50.
