= Minnesota State Highway 75 =

Minnesota State Highway 75 may refer to:

- U.S. Route 75 in Minnesota
- Minnesota State Highway 75 (1920-1933), a numbered highway in Minnesota
