= Folgueras (Pravia) =

Coordinates: 43.503889°N 6.1425°W

Folgueras is one of fifteen parishes (administrative divisions) in Pravia, a municipality within the province and autonomous community of Asturias, in northern Spain.

The population is 178 (INE 2011).

== Villages and hamlets ==
- Ablanedo (Ablanéu)
- Folgueras
- Loro (Llouru)
- Sorriba (Surriba)
- Vegafriosa (Veigafriosa)
