= Cordoveiru =

Parish in Pravia, Asturias, Spain

Coordinates: 43.471389°N 6.215278°W

Cordoveiru is one of fifteen parishes in Pravia, a municipality within the province and autonomous community of Asturias, in northern Spain.

The population is 102 (INE 2007).

== Villages and hamlets ==
La Castañal

- Llugar de Baxu
  - Bermudu
  - Callescura
  - L'Auteiru
  - La Caleona
- Llugar de Riba
  - El Llanucu
  - El Prau Mediu
  - El Quintanón
  - En Ca Francu
  - En Ca'l Pigüeñu
  - La Cuvona
  - Los Llanos

Cordoveiru

- El Molín del Homón
- El Piconal
- L'Obispu
- La Tienda
- La Villa Abaxu
  - Casa Camilu
- La Villa Arriba

Las Piñeras

- El Bustiellu
- El Fameiru
- El Rebollu
- La Calle la Sartén
- La Calzada
- Valdevillar

Villamondriz

- El Celleiru
- El Saleiru
- En Ca Benitón
- En Ca Caitanu
- En Ca Colás
- L'Aspra
- L'Oteiru
- La Cabaña
- La Casuca
- La Xira
- Las Figales
