= Pronga =

Parish in Pravia, Asturias, Spain

Coordinates: 43.466111°N 6.103611°W

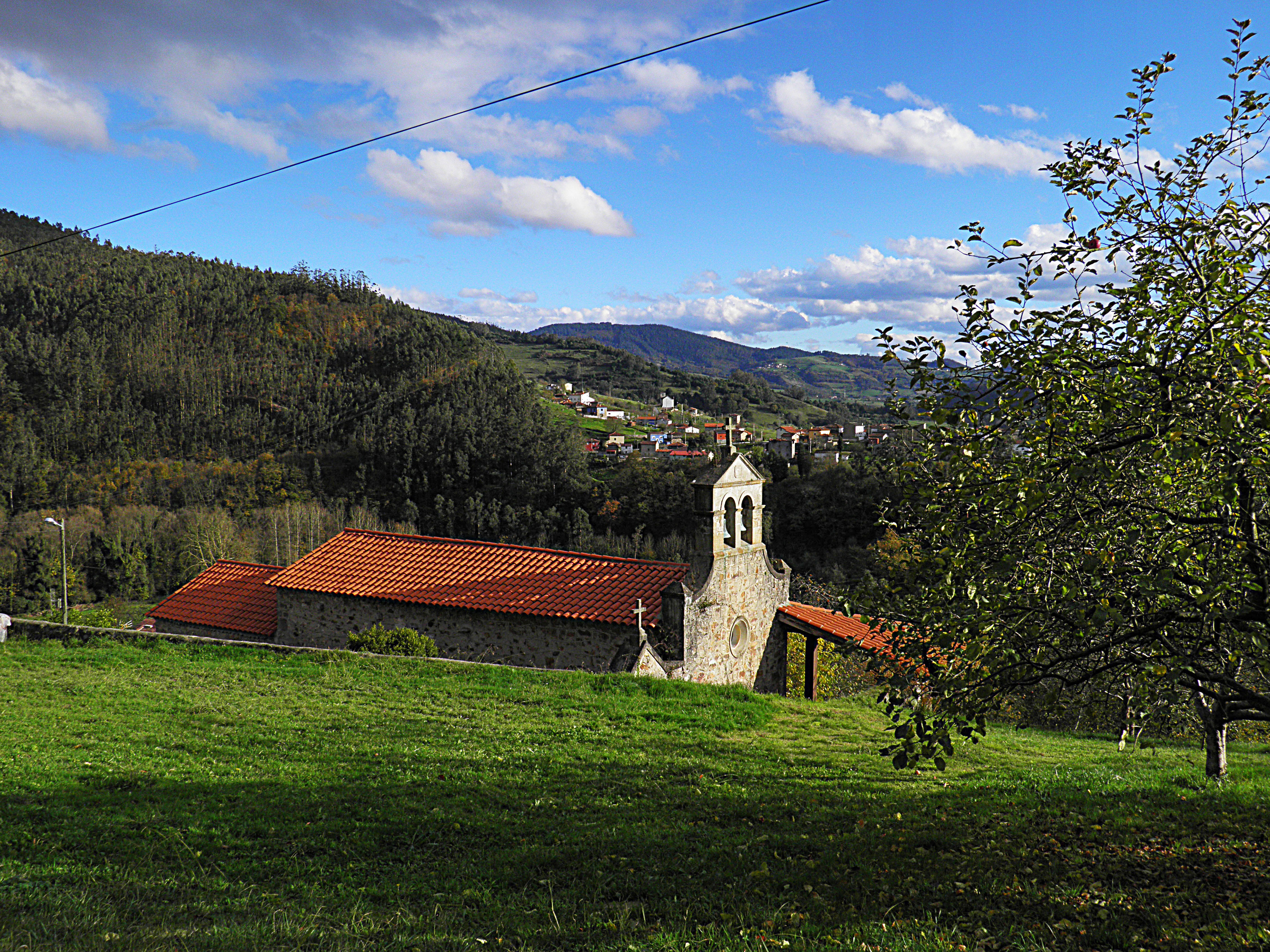
Pronga (Pravia, Asturias)

Pronga is one of fifteen parishes (administrative divisions) in Pravia, a municipality within the province and autonomous community of Asturias, in northern Spain.

The population is 61 (INE 2011).

== Villages and hamlets ==
- Beifar
- Pronga
