= Selgas =

Coordinates: 43.481667°N 6.159167°W

Selgas is one of fifteen parishes (administrative divisions) in Pravia, a municipality within the province and autonomous community of Asturias, in northern Spain.

The population is 68 (INE 2011).

== Villages and hamlets ==
- Caliero (Calieiru)
- Selgas de Abajo (Selgas d'Abaxu)
- Selgas de Arriba (Selgas'Arriba)
