= Inclán =

Coordinates: 43.478333°N 6.177778°W

Inclán is one of fifteen parishes (administrative divisions) in Pravia, a municipality within the province and autonomous community of Asturias, in northern Spain.

It is situated 7 kilometers from the municipal capital, Pravia, at an elevation of 230 meters above sea level. The hamlet consists of 14 houses, of which 9 are classified as main residences and 5 as non-main residences. The parish as a whole contains 106 houses.

The population is 208 (INE 2011).

== Villages and hamlets ==
- Fondos de Villa
- Godina (Gudina)
- Inclán
- Masfera
- San Esteban
- Villameján (Villamexán)
