= San Damías =

Parish in Pravia, Spain

Coordinates: 43.45°N 6.138611°W

San Damías is one of fifteen parishes (administrative divisions) in Pravia, a municipality within the province and autonomous community of Asturias, in northern Spain.

The population is 67 (INE 2011).

== Villages and hamlets ==
Perzanas

- La Salada
- Trespeña

Villagonzái

- Ca Andrés
- Ca Severa
- L'Abiera
- La Barrosa
- La Corredoria
- La Mariña

San Damías

- Ca Celeste
- Ca Eugeniu
- Ca Gaspara
- Ca Guarín
- Ca Santos
- El Caleyu
- El Riestru
- La Cabañona
- La Casanueva
- La Dueña
- La Quinta d'Arriba
- La Quintana Abaxu
- La Quintana del Mediu
- Peñalba
- Peñeirada
- Rozadas
