= Quinzanas =

Coordinates: 43.466111°N 6.103611°W

Quinzanas is one of fifteen parishes (administrative divisions) in Pravia, a municipality within the province and autonomous community of Asturias, in northern Spain.

The population is 77 (INE 2011).

== Villages and hamlets ==
- Docina
- La Vallina
- Entrelaiglesia
- La Reguera
- La Brueva
- El Estornin
- Tranvaregueras
- La Xuiría
- La Cuesta
- El Xardín
- Serrapiu
- Vegañán
