= Pravia =

- Municipality
- Flag Coat of arms

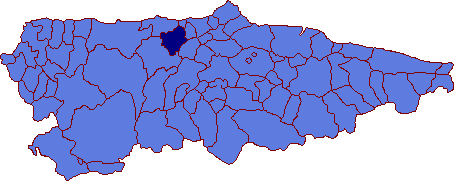

- Location in Spain
- Coordinates: 43°29′N 6°6′W
- Country: Spain
- Autonomous community: Asturias
- Province: Asturias
- Comarca: Avilés
- Judicial district: Pravia
- Capital: Pravia

Government
  - Alcalde: Antonio de Luis Solar (PSOE)

Area
  - Total: 102.96 km^{2} (39.75 sq mi)
- Highest elevation: 678 m (2,224 ft)

Population (2025-01-01)
  - Total: 7,792
  - Density: 75.68/km^{2} (196.0/sq mi)
- Demonym: praviano/a
- Time zone: UTC+1 (CET)
  - Summer (DST): UTC+2 (CEST)
- Postal code: 33120
- Website: Official website

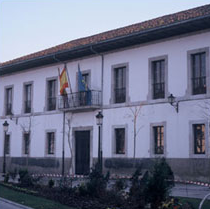
Pravia's City Hall.

Pravia is a municipality in the Autonomous Community of the Principality of Asturias in Spain. It is bordered on the north by Cudillero and Muros de Nalón, on the east by Candamo and Soto del Barco, on the west by Cudillero and Salas, and on the south by Candamo and Salas.

Since 774, when King Silo established his court at Santianes de Pravia, until the reign of Alfonso II, it was the capital of the kingdom of Asturias.

== Parishes ==
- Arangu
- Cordoveiru
- Courias
- Escuréu
- Folgueras
- Inclán
- Muros
- Pravia
- Pronga
- Quinzanas
- San Damías
- Santianes
- Selgas
- Villafría
- Villavaler

== See also ==
- List of municipalities in Asturias
