= List of highways numbered 73 =

The following highways are numbered 73:

== Australia ==
- Batman Highway (Tasmania)

== Canada ==
- Newfoundland and Labrador Route 73
- Quebec Autoroute 73

== Germany ==
- Bundesautobahn 73
- Bundesstraße 73

== Greece ==
- EO73 road

== India ==
- National Highway 73 (India)

== Israel ==
- Highway 73 (Israel)

== Japan ==
- Okayama Expressway
- Yonago Expressway

== Malaysia ==
- Malaysia Federal Route 73

== Netherlands ==
- A73 motorway (Netherlands)

== New Zealand ==
- New Zealand State Highway 73

== Philippines ==
- N73 highway (Philippines)

== Poland ==
- National road 73 (Poland)

== Spain ==
- Autovía A-73

== United Arab Emirates ==
- Dubai Road 73

== United Kingdom ==
- A73 road

== United States ==
- Interstate 73
- U.S. Route 73
- Alabama State Route 73
  - County Route 73 (Lee County, Alabama)
- Arizona State Route 73
- Arkansas Highway 73
- California State Route 73
- Connecticut Route 73
- Florida State Road 73
  - County Road 73A (Calhoun County, Florida)
  - County Road 73B (Calhoun County, Florida)
- Georgia State Route 73
  - Georgia State Route 73E (former)
  - Georgia State Route 73W (former)
- Illinois Route 73
- Indiana State Road 73 (former)
- Kentucky Route 73
- Louisiana Highway 73
  - Louisiana State Route 73 (former)
- Maine State Route 73
- Maryland Route 73 (former)
- M-73 (Michigan highway)
- Minnesota State Highway 73
  - County Road 73 (Dakota County, Minnesota)
  - County Road 73 (Hennepin County, Minnesota)
  - County Road 73 (Ramsey County, Minnesota)
- Missouri Route 73
- Nebraska Highway 73 (former)
  - Nebraska Recreation Road 73A
- Nevada State Route 73 (former)
- New Jersey Route 73
  - County Route 73 (Bergen County, New Jersey)
- New Mexico State Road 73
- New York State Route 73
  - County Route 73 (Dutchess County, New York)
  - County Route 73 (Erie County, New York)
  - County Route 73 (Oneida County, New York)
  - County Route 73 (Onondaga County, New York)
  - County Route 73 (Orleans County, New York)
  - County Route 73 (Putnam County, New York)
  - County Route 73 (Rockland County, New York)
  - County Route 73 (Suffolk County, New York)
    - County Route 73A (Suffolk County, New York)
- North Carolina Highway 73
- North Dakota Highway 73
- Ohio State Route 73
- Oklahoma State Highway 73
  - Oklahoma State Highway 73 (1930s-1950s) (former)
- Pennsylvania Route 73
- South Carolina Highway 73 (former)
- South Dakota Highway 73
- Tennessee State Route 73
- Texas State Highway 73
  - Texas State Highway Loop 73 (former)
  - Texas State Highway Spur 73
  - Texas State Highway Spur 73 (1939) (former)
  - Farm to Market Road 73
  - Texas Park Road 73
- Utah State Route 73
- Vermont Route 73
- Virginia State Route 73
- West Virginia Route 73
- Wisconsin Highway 73
- Wyoming Highway 73

Territories

- U.S. Virgin Islands Highway 73

== See also ==
- A73 roads

Preceded by 72	Lists of highways 73	Succeeded by 74
