= Pravia (parish) =

Coordinates: 43.492222°N 6.109722°W

Pravia is one of fifteen parishes (administrative divisions) in Pravia, a municipality within the province and autonomous community of Asturias, in northern Spain.

The population is 6,660 (INE 2011).

== Villages and hamlets ==
- Agones
- Cañedo (Cañéu)
- Cadarienzo
- Campasola
- Corralinos
- El Cabrón
- Forcinas
- Peñaullán (Pinullán)
- Prahúa
- Pravia
