= Muros (Pravia) =

Coordinates: 43.533333°N 6.116667°W

Muros is one of fifteen parishes (administrative divisions) in Pravia, a municipality within the province and autonomous community of Asturias, in northern Spain.

The population is 280 (INE 2019).

== Hamlets ==
- El Campu
- El Carbayéu
- El Marciel
- El Molín
- El Nocéu
- El Palomar
- El Parque
- El Pericón
- El Peñucu
- El Pisón
- El Pozón
- El Raposu
- Grandamena
- La Calle l'Aeta
- La Covarona
- La Marroquina
- La Nocediega
- La Peña
- La Rampla
- La Reigada
  - El Teicu
  - La Cueva
  - La Quintana
  - Los Caduxos
- La Serradera
- La Torre
- La Zafil
- Las Tablas
- Santolaya
  - Santolaya de Baxu
  - Santolaya de Riba
- Vidreiru
