= Autovía A-231 =

Road from León to Burgos (Spain)

Autovía A-231
- Autovía del Camino de Santiago
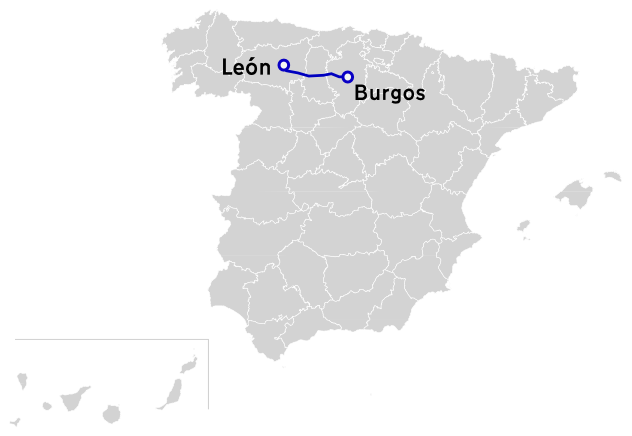

Route information
- Length: 157 km (98 mi)

Major junctions
- From: León
- To: Burgos

Location
- Country: Spain

Highway system
- Highways in Spain; Autopistas and autovías; National Roads

The Autovía A-231 (also known as Autovía del Camino de Santiago) is a local autovía in the community of Castile and León, Spain. It is 157 km (98 miles) long and runs from the Autovía A-66 at León to the Autovía BU-30 at Burgos, where it connects with the Autovía A-62 and the Autovía A-1. It was built between 1998 and 2003, and runs parallel to the Way of St. James (hence its name) and the N-120 road.
