= A73 =

A73 or A-73 may refer to:

== Roads ==
- A73 motorway (Netherlands)
- A73 road, in the UK
- Quebec Autoroute 73 in Quebec
- Autovía A-73, a Spanish motorway
- Bundesautobahn 73, a German motorway also called A 73

== Animals ==
- A73, an orca more commonly known as Springer (orca)

== Other uses ==
- Benoni Defense, in the Encyclopaedia of Chess Openings
- ARM Cortex-A73, a microprocessor
- Samsung Galaxy A73 5G, an Android smartphone

== See also ==
- List of highways numbered 73
