= Arangu (Pravia) =

Coordinates: 43.458611°N 6.171667°W

Arangu is one of fifteen parishes (administrative divisions) in Pravia, a municipality within the province and autonomous community of Asturias, in northern Spain.

The population is 264 (INE 2007).

== Villages and hamlets ==
- Allence
  - La Reguera
- Arboriu
  - La Calle
  - Llavandera
  - El Quintanal
  - La Pandiella
- La Braña
- Caunéu
- La Xungal
- Prada
  - Bouzu
  - Brueva
  - El Llanón
  - Moruxéu
  - La Parada
  - El Saleiru
  - Talavera
- La Ponteveiga
- Quintana
- Ribeiru
  - Ribeiru Baxu
  - Ribeiru Riba
- San Pelayu
- Las Tablas
  - La Ceniza
  - Controba
  - La Tiera
  - La Torre
- El Traveséu
  - La Devesa
  - Lleréu
  - El Rebollal
  - En Ca'l Zapateiru
  - San Vicente
  - Suculmonte
