= Escuréu =

Coordinates: 43.503889°N 6.1425°W

Escuréu (Asturian pronunciation: [esˈkuɾøw]) is one of fifteen parishes (administrative divisions) in Pravia, a municipality within the province and autonomous community of Asturias, in northern Spain.

The population is 77 (INE 2011).

== Villages and hamlets ==
Escuréu

- L'Abedul
- El Campu [d'Escuréu]
- El Castañéu
- Los Llanos

La Pandiella

- La Pandiella de Baxu
- La Pandiella de Riba

Villarigán

- Barreiru
- El Campu [de Villarigán]
- El Zarru
- La Barraca
- La Villa d'Arriba
- La Villa d'Abaxu
- Villacumbre
