= List of highways numbered 75 =

The following highways are numbered 75:

== International ==
- AH75 Asian Highway 75
- E75 European route E75

== Afghanistan ==
- Kandahar-Boldak Highway (A75)

== Australia ==
- Cobb Highway, NSW
- Northern Highway, Victoria

== Brazil ==
- SP-75

== Canada ==
- Manitoba Highway 75
- Newfoundland and Labrador Route 75

== China ==
- G75 Lanzhou–Haikou Expressway

== France ==
- A75 autoroute

== Greece ==
- EO75 road

== India ==
- National Highway 75 (India)

== Israel ==
- Highway 75 (Israel)

== Korea, South ==
- National Route 75

== New Zealand ==
- New Zealand State Highway 75

== Philippines ==
- N75 highway (Philippines)

== United Kingdom ==
- A75 road in Scotland

== United States ==
- Interstate 75
  - Interstate 75E (former proposal)
- U.S. Route 75
- Alabama State Route 75
  - County Route 75 (Lee County, Alabama)
- Arizona State Route 75
- Arkansas Highway 75
- California State Route 75
- Colorado State Highway 75
- Connecticut Route 75
- Florida State Road 75
- Georgia State Route 75
- Idaho State Highway 75
- Illinois Route 75
- Indiana State Road 75
- Kentucky Route 75 (former)
- Louisiana Highway 75
- Maryland Route 75
  - Maryland Route 75A
  - Maryland Route 75FB (former)
  - Maryland Route 75FC (former)
- Massachusetts Route 75
- M-75 (Michigan highway)
- Minnesota State Highway 75 (1920-1933) (former)
  - County Road 75 (Ramsey County, Minnesota)
  - County Road 75 (Stearns County, Minnesota)
  - County Road 75 (Wright County, Minnesota)
- Missouri Route 75
- Nebraska Highway 75 (former)
- Nevada State Route 75 (former)
- New Hampshire Route 75
- New Jersey Route 75 (former proposal)
  - County Route 75 (Bergen County, New Jersey)
- New Mexico State Road 75
- New York State Route 75
  - County Route 75 (Cattaraugus County, New York)
  - County Route 75 (Chautauqua County, New York)
  - County Route 75 (Dutchess County, New York)
  - County Route 75 (Erie County, New York)
  - County Route 75 (Essex County, New York)
  - County Route 75 (Greene County, New York)
  - County Route 75 (Herkimer County, New York)
  - County Route 75 (Jefferson County, New York)
  - County Route 75 (Madison County, New York)
  - County Route 75 (Rockland County, New York)
  - County Route 75 (Saratoga County, New York)
  - County Route 75 (Suffolk County, New York)
  - County Route 75 (Washington County, New York)
- North Carolina Highway 75
- Ohio State Route 75 (1923) (former)
- Pennsylvania Route 75
- South Carolina Highway 75
- South Dakota Highway 75
- Tennessee State Route 75
- Texas State Highway 75
  - Texas State Highway Loop 75
  - Farm to Market Road 75
- Utah State Route 75
- Virginia State Route 75
- West Virginia Route 75
- Wisconsin Highway 75
- Wyoming Highway 75 (former)

Territories

- U.S. Virgin Islands Highway 75

== See also ==
- A75 (disambiguation)

Preceded by 74	Lists of highways 75	Succeeded by 76
