= Villafría =

Coordinates: 43.5125°N 6.153056°W

Villafría is one of fifteen parishes (administrative divisions) in Pravia, a municipality within the province and autonomous community of Asturias, in northern Spain.

The population is 76 (INE 2011).

== Villages and hamlets ==
- Recuevo (Ricouvu)
- Villafría
- Villamuñín
