= A74 =

A74 or A-74 may refer to:

- A74 road, a major road in the UK
- A74(M) and M74 motorways, another road in the UK that largely replaced the original A74
- Benoni Defense, in the Encyclopaedia of Chess Openings
- HLA-A74, an HLA-A serotype
- Iceberg A-74, an iceberg calved from the Antarctic Brunt Ice Shelf in February 2021
