= A75 =

A75 or A-75 may refer to:

- A75 motorway (France), a road connecting Clermont-Ferrand and Béziers
- A75 road (Scotland), a road connecting Carlisle and Ayr
- A-75 motorway (Spain), a road connecting the A-52 motorway near Verín with the Portuguese Auto-estrada A24 near Chaves
- A75 Fusion Controller Hub, a chipset used for AMD microprocessors
- Benoni Defense, in the Encyclopaedia of Chess Openings
- Canon PowerShot A75, a digital camera made by Canon
- Toshiba Satellite A75, a laptop made by Toshiba

== See also ==
- A7S, Alexander Michael Tidebrink Stomberg (born 1994), Swedish singer, DJ, and producer
