= Villatoro =

- municipality
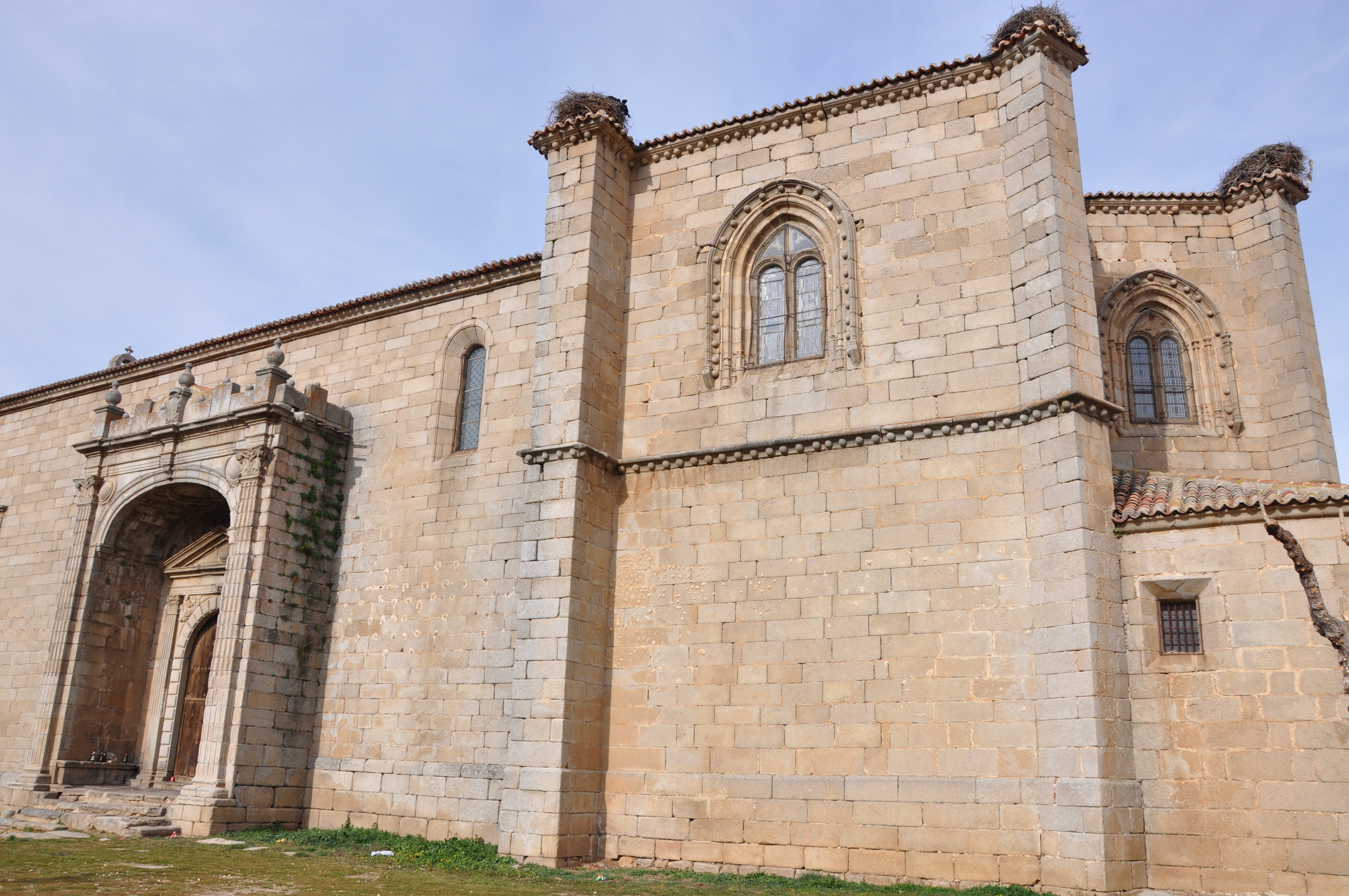
- Church of San Miguel Arcángel, Villatoro, Ávila

- Flag Coat of arms

- Location in Spain. Villatoro (Spain)
- Coordinates: 40°33′22″N 5°06′40″W
- Country: Spain
- Autonomous community: Castile and León
- Province: Ávila

Area
  - Total: 56.02 km^{2} (21.63 sq mi)
- Elevation: 1,183 m (3,881 ft)

Population (2025-01-01)
  - Total: 150
  - Density: 2.7/km^{2} (6.9/sq mi)
- Time zone: UTC+1 (CET)
  - Summer (DST): UTC+2 (CEST)
- Website: Official website

Villatoro is a municipality in Spain belonging to the province of Ávila, in the autonomous community of Castile and León.

== Population ==
Historical population
Year	Pop.	±% p.a.
2023	152	—
2024	161	+5.92%
2025	150	−6.83%
Source: INE
