= Canicosa de la Sierra =

Coordinates: 41°56′N 3°02′W

- Municipality and town
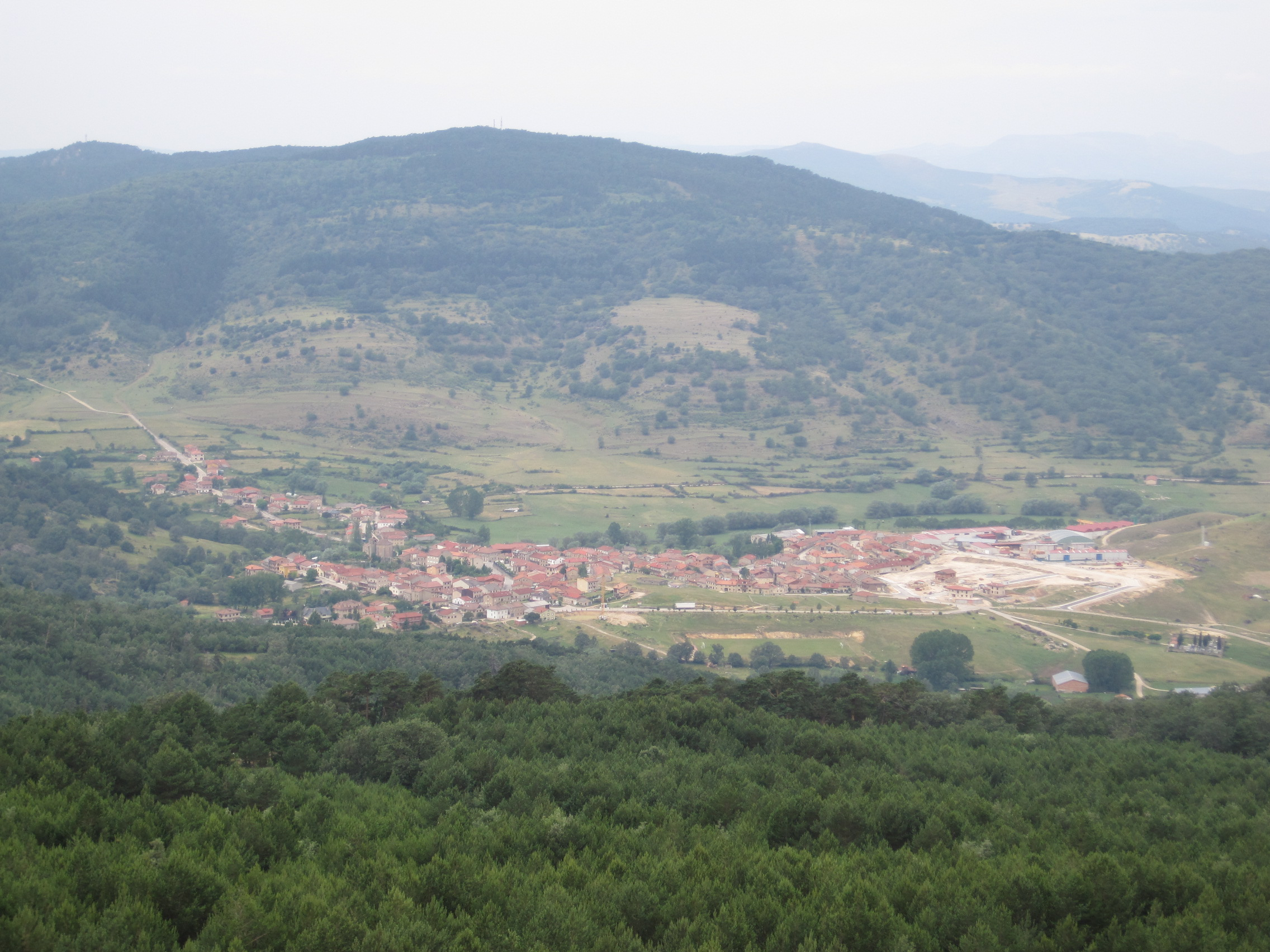
- Panoramic view of Canicosa de la Sierra, 2010

- Coat of arms

- Municipal location of Canicosa de la Sierra in Burgos province
- Autonomous community: Castile and León
- Province: Burgos
- Comarca: Sierra de la Demanda

Area
  - Total: 30 km^{2} (12 sq mi)
- Elevation: 1,127 m (3,698 ft)

Population (2025-01-01)
  - Total: 410
  - Density: 14/km^{2} (35/sq mi)
- Time zone: UTC+1 (CET)
  - Summer (DST): UTC+2 (CEST)
- Postal code: 09692
- Website: http://www.canicosadelasierra.es/

Canicosa de la Sierra is a municipality located in the province of Burgos, Castile and León, Spain. According to the 2004 census (INE), the municipality has a population of 575 inhabitants.
