= Villalbilla de Burgos =

Coordinates: 42°21′N 3°47′W

- municipality
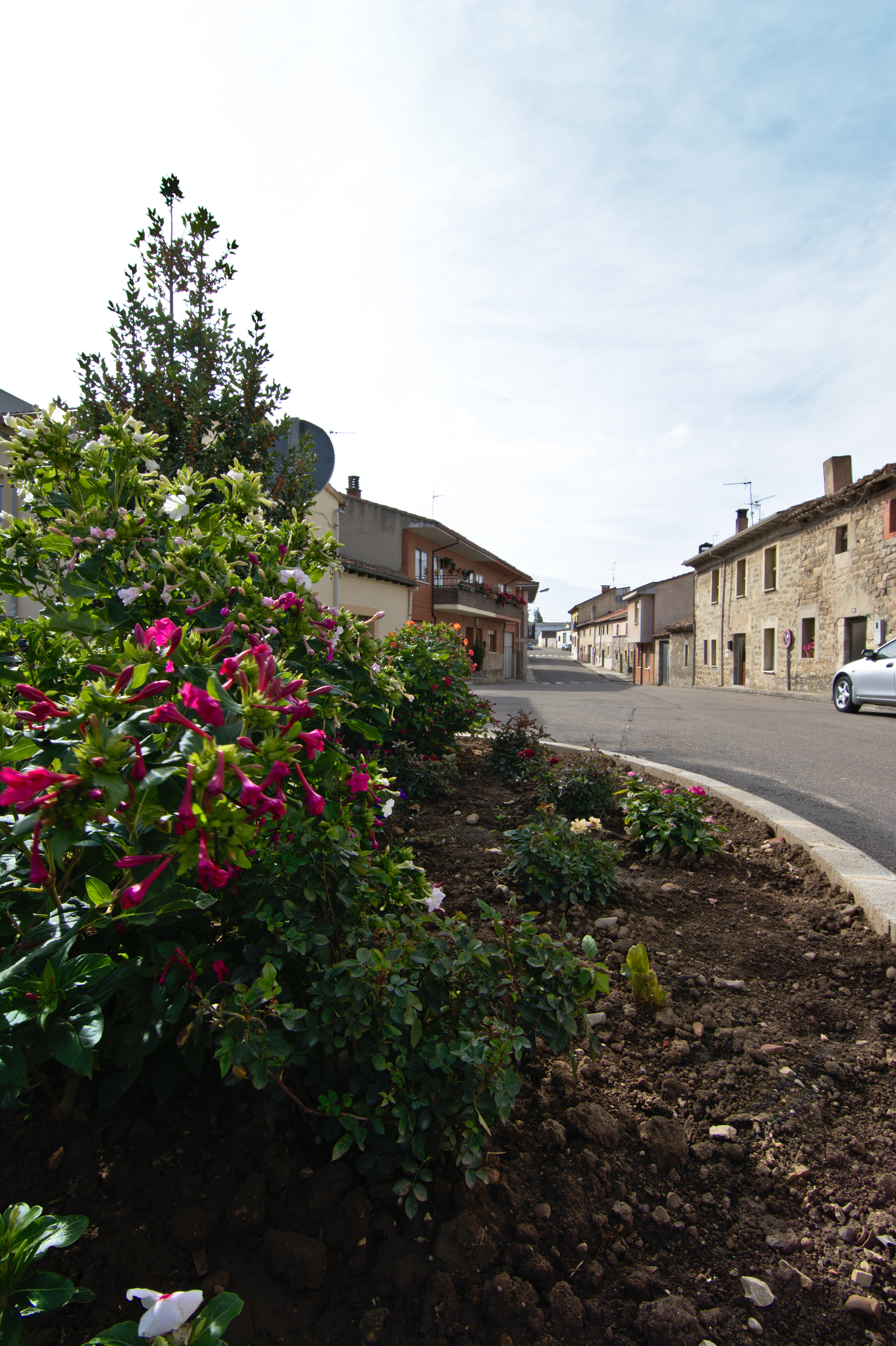

- Flag Coat of arms
- Interactive map of Villalbilla de Burgos
- Country: Spain
- Autonomous community: Castile and León
- Province: Burgos

Area
  - Total: 14 km^{2} (5.4 sq mi)

Population (2025-01-01)
  - Total: 1,554
  - Density: 110/km^{2} (290/sq mi)
- Time zone: UTC+1 (CET)
  - Summer (DST): UTC+2 (CEST)

Villalbilla de Burgos is a municipality located in the province of Burgos, Castile and León, Spain. According to the 2004 census (INE), the municipality has a population of 819 inhabitants.
