= Autovía =

Controlled-access highway in Spain

Sign for autovía in Spain

An autovía is one of two classes of major highway in the Spanish road system similar to a British motorway or an American freeway. It is akin to the autopista, the other major highway class, but has fewer features and is never a toll road. Some distinguishing features of an autovía are that it must be divided by a median, it must have restricted access, and it cannot be crossed by other roads. While autopistas are generally new routes, autovías are normally improvements to existing roads, so they may have tighter curves and less safe accesses, often with shorter acceleration lanes. However, both have nominal speed limits of 120 kilometres per hour (75 mph). Rest areas are usually 300 kilometres (190 mi) or 2 hours apart. There is usually a safety lane along the median.

Although generally state-owned and financed, there are some autovías which are actually built and maintained by private companies, such as Pamplona-Logroño A-12. The company assumes the building costs and the Autonomous Community where they are located (in the given example, Navarre) pays a yearly per-vehicle fee to the company based upon usage statistics. This fee is called a shadow toll (Spanish: peaje en la sombra). The system can be regarded as a way for the Government to finance the construction of new roads without any initial outlay of money. Also, since payment starts after the road is finished, there are fewer construction delays in comparison with regular state-owned construction.

== Restricted access ==
Most autovías are restricted to car, motorcycle, and lorry use only. Restricted forms of transport include the horse, mopeds and tractors. Because autovías often exist as an improvement to an existing road, users of these restricted forms of transport may often find themselves having to take long diversions in order to reach their intended destination. It is very rare that alternative routes will be provided for these users.

Bicycles may travel on the shoulders of some autovías, but not autopistas.

== List of Autovías ==
- A-1
- A-12 - Pamplona to Logroño
- A-62
- A-73 - Burgos to Aguilar de Campoo
- A-231 - Autovía del Camino de Santiago, León to Burgos

== Other uses ==
Autovía was also the name of a 2 car DMU train of the Ferrocarriles Nacionales de México that operated between Ciudad Juárez and Chihuahua, Mexico.

Autovías is the name of the first-class service of the Herradura de Plata Mexican bus company operating in the vicinity of the Mexican state of Michoacán.

== See also ==
- Controlled-access highway
