= Autovía A-73 =

Motorway in Spain

Autovía A-73

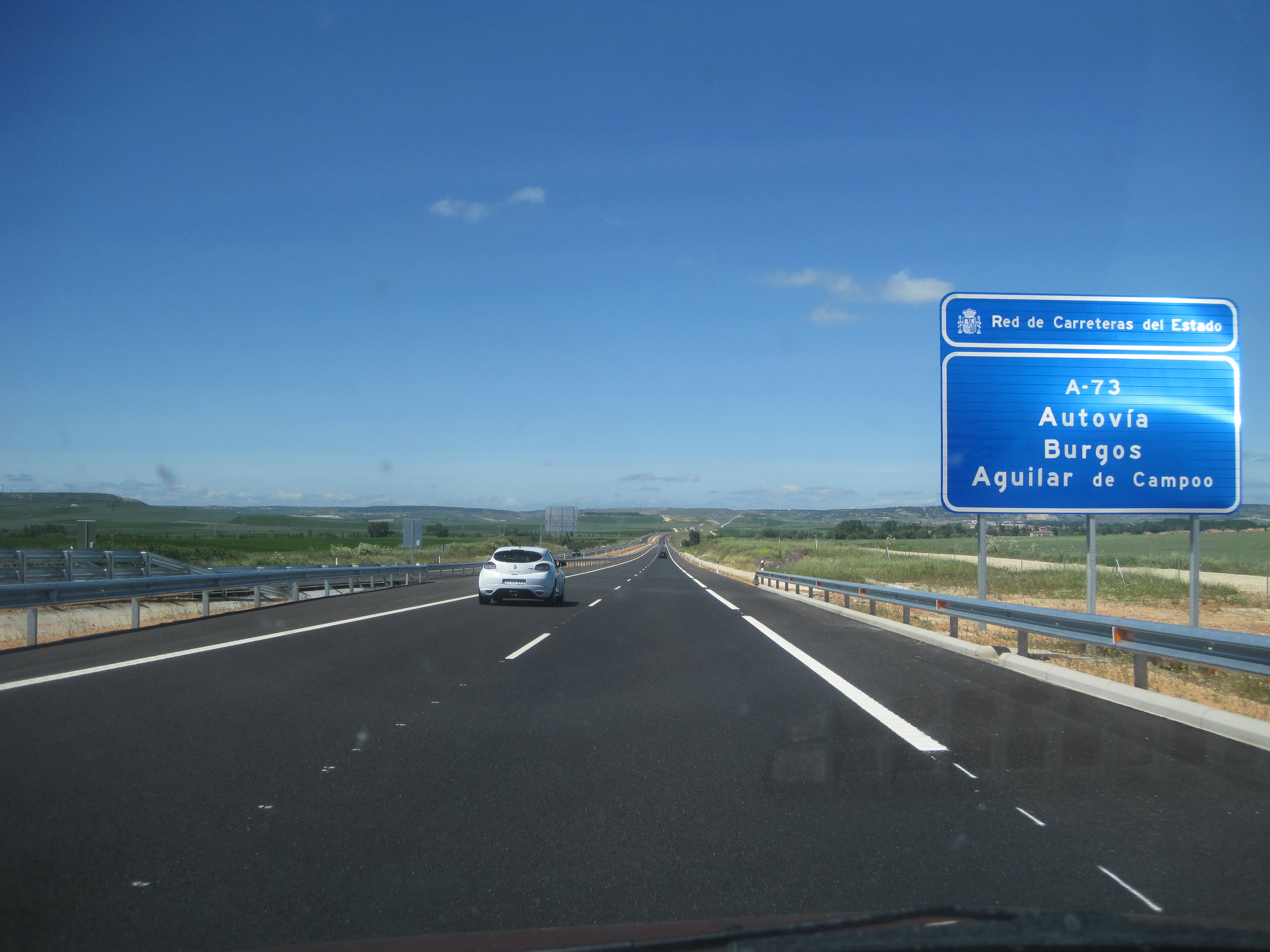
- The A-73 near Burgos

Route information
- Length: 21.85 km (13.58 mi)

Major junctions
- From: Burgos
- To: Aguilar de Campoo

Location
- Country: Spain
- Autonomous community: Castile and Leon
- Provinces: Burgos, Palencia

Highway system
- Highways in Spain; Autopistas and autovías; National Roads

The Autovía A-73 is a highway in Spain. When completed, it will have a length of 74.1 km (46.0 mi) and will link Burgos with Aguilar de Campoo. As of 2023, two sections have been built: from Burgos to Quintanaortuño, opened in 2013; and from Pedrosa de Valdelucio to Báscones de Valdivia, opened in 2021.
