= Autovía A-62 =

Road in Spain

Autovía A-62
- Autovía de Castilla
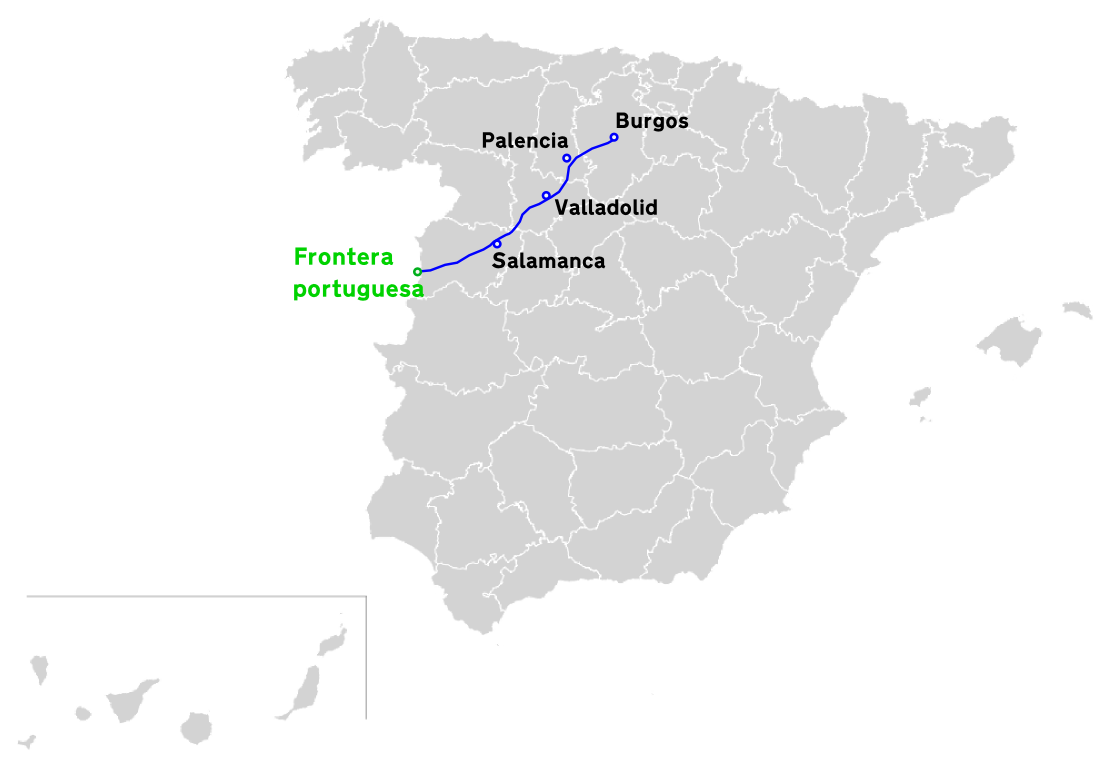

Route information
- Part of E80
- Length: 355 km (221 mi)

Major junctions
- From: Burgos
- To: Fuentes de Oñoro

Location
- Country: Spain

Highway system
- Highways in Spain; Autopistas and autovías; National Roads

The Autovía A-62 (also known as Autovía de Castilla) is a Spanish autovía which starts in Burgos and runs through the community of Castile and León, via the cities of Palencia, Valladolid and Salamanca, before ending at the Portuguese border and the A25 autoestrada. It forms part of European route E80 and replaced the former N-620 road.

It is one of the most-used roads in Castile and León, as it is frequently used by drivers travelling between France and Portugal.

== History ==
Conversion of the N-620 to autovía standard began in the mid-1980s, when the section between Palencia and Valladolid was upgraded to dual carriageway with same-level junctions. During the 1990s, the Burgos - Palencia and Valladolid - Salamanca sections were upgraded in a similar manner, but with grade-separated junctions and slip roads; the junctions on the Palencia - Valladolid section were improved accordingly at a similar time.

The A-62 designation was introduced in 2003, as part of the general renumbering of Spanish autovías. The section between Salamanca and Ciudad Rodrigo was built during 2003 and 2004, and the section between Ciudad Rodrigo and Fuentes de Oñoro during 2008. The final section, connecting Fuentes de Oñoro with the Portuguese border and the A25 autoestrada, opened in 2021.

== Controversy over the name ==
In December 2016, Compromís senator Carles Mulet García asked for the name of the A-62 to be changed, arguing that it was inappropriate because more than half of its route passes through Zamora and Salamanca rather than Castile. He also requested repairs to the road surface between Tordesillas and Salamanca. In January 2019, Compromís petitioned the Senate for the name change, describing the designation as “absurd and inappropriate”.
