= Tagus Basin =

Drainage basin of the Tagus River

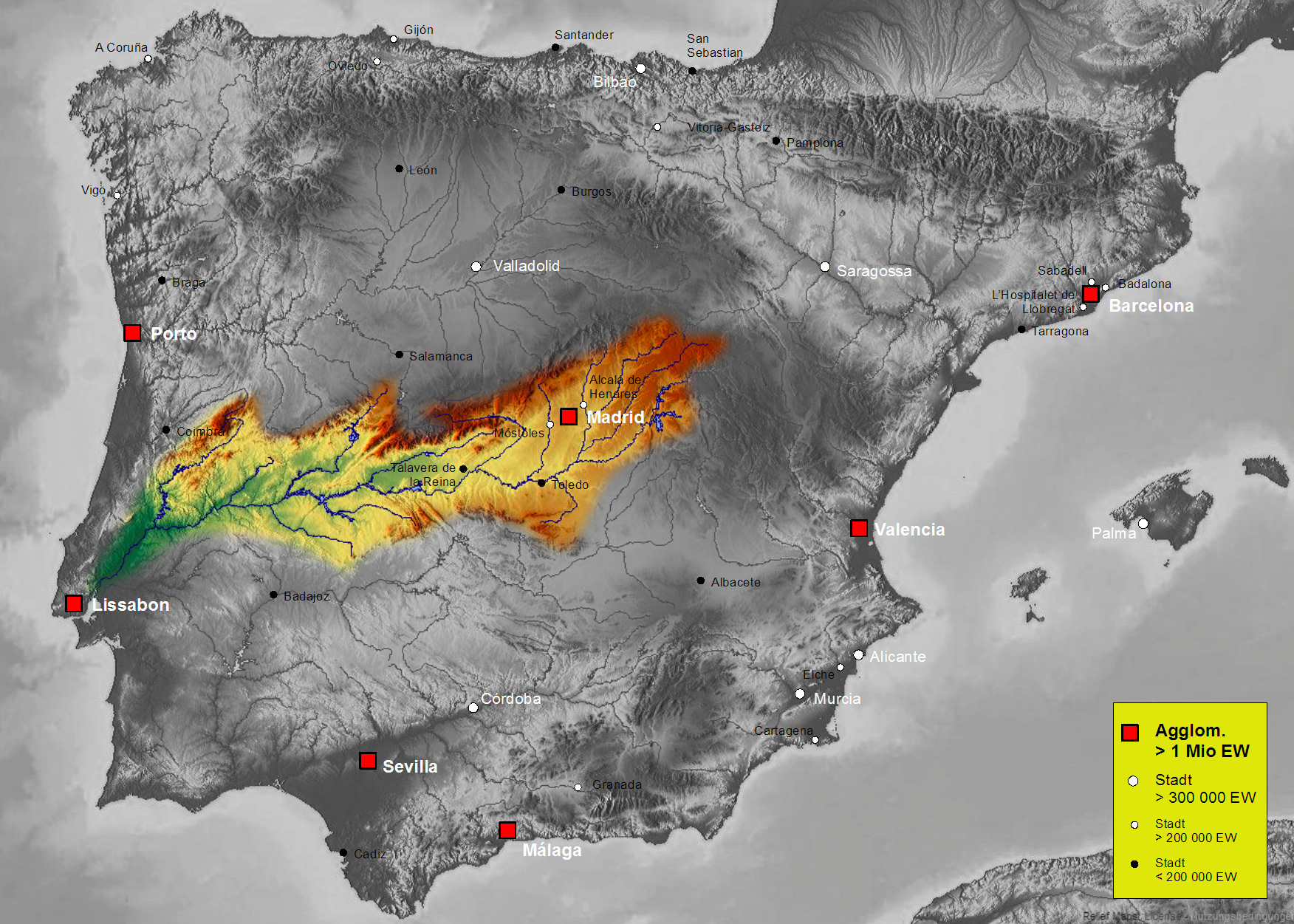
Map of the Tagus Basin.

The Tagus Basin is the drainage basin of the Tagus River, which flows through the west of the Iberian Peninsula and empties into Lisbon. It covers an area of 78,467 km^{2}, which is distributed 66% (55,645 km^{2}) on Spanish territory and 34% on Portuguese land (22,822 km^{2}).

It is the third-largest basin in the Iberian Peninsula, after the Douro Basin, with 98,258 km^{2}, and the Ebro Basin, with 82,587 km^{2}.

	Tagus Spain	Total Tagus	% Spain/total
Length (km)	910	1092	83.3
Surface area km^{2}	55,645	83,678	66
Population (inhab)	7,000,000	10,000,000	70

== Physical environment ==
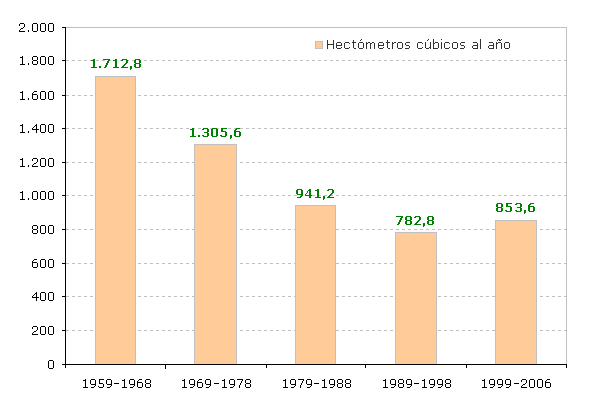
Flow in the Upper Tagus.

The Tagus basin is one of the most important in the Peninsula, due to its extension and its flow, being the one with the highest population density in Spain and the peninsula. It is formed by an elongated surface with an east–west orientation, the Tagus River flows from the Sierra de Albarracín, where it has its source, to the estuary, Mar de la Paja, next to Lisbon, through the center of the Hesperian Massif with a length of 910 km, in the Spanish area, 1092 km in total length. The basin is wedged between the Central System, to the north, the Montes de Toledo and Sierra de Montánchez, to the south and the Iberian System, (Serranía de Cuenca and Sierra de Albarracín), to the east; bordering to the north with the Ebro and Douro basins; to the south with the Guadiana Basin and to the east with the Ebro and Júcar basins. The western limit, as far as the Spanish area is concerned, is delimited by the Erjas and Sever rivers, which form the border with Portuga]. In the interior of the area defined by these mountains and by the minor reliefs of the Hercynian massif, which completes the closure to the west, it is structured in a graben filled by Cenozoic materials, sands, clays, marls, gypsum and some limestone in the upper levels, which constitute horizons of silting up of the ancient lake that occupied the original depression.

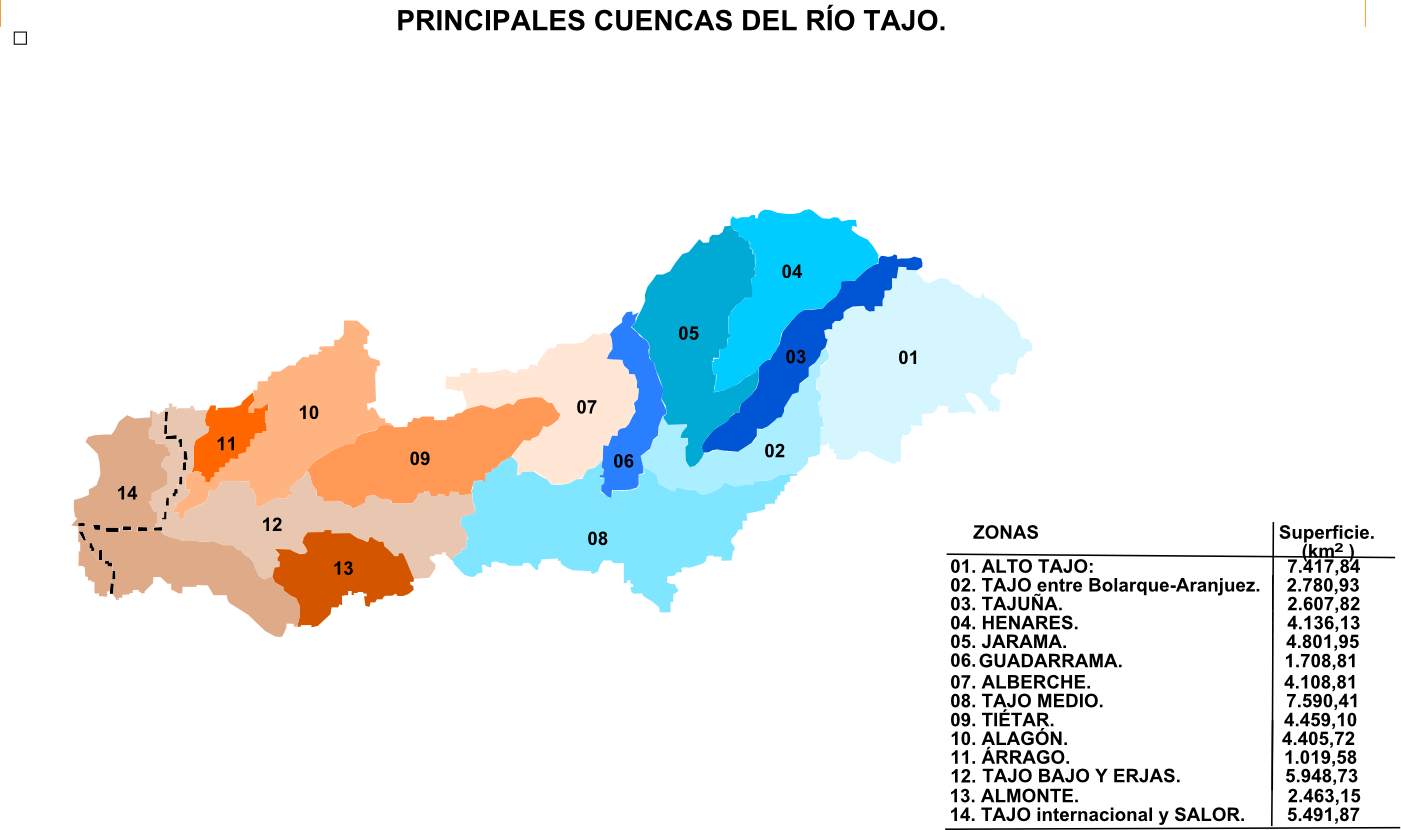
Sub-basins of the Tagus River.

The mountain ridges of the Tagus basin only reach high altitudes in the Central System, especially in the middle and eastern sectors (Sierra de Béjar, Sierra de Gredos and Sierra de Guadarrama), where they frequently exceed 2000 meters above sea level; in the Iberian System, only some peaks of the Montes Universales exceed 1800 m.a.s.l., while in the Montes de Toledo the altitudes are considerably lower. The altitude of the interior depression is much lower, although very variable, decreasing rapidly from the extreme northeast to the western edge, thus, while in the plains of La Alcarria the heights are close to 1000 m.a.s.l, in Aranjuez they drop below 500 m.a.s.l, in Navalmoral de la Mata to 300 and in the lands to the south of Coria to little more than 200 [m.a.s.l.. Therefore, some of the tributaries of the middle sector of the Tagus have captured part of the original Douro basin by headward erosion, favored by the greater gradients determined by the altimetric difference between the two basins, the most characteristic examples being the Alberche and the Alagón.

The network of tributary rivers of the Tagus is very dissymmetrical, those on the right bank are the ones that provide the most abundant flows, as they collect the contributions from the central system and the Iberian system; the left tributaries are generally shorter and have a low flow, especially those that originate in the Montes de Toledo.

The longest rivers in the Tagus basin are:

Name	Length (km)
Tagus River	910
Tajuña River	254.1
Alagón River	208.6
Jarama River	204.9
Alberche River	193.8
Tiétar River	175.7
Hernares River	172.9
Guadarrama River	131.8
Salor River	126.3
Almonde River	122.9
Guadiela River	109.5
Gallo River	107.1
Algodor River	101.2
Manzanares River	92

== Biotic framework ==
The biotic framework of the Tagus Basin, due to its geology, geomorphology and climatology, presents a great variety of ecosystems that include different habitats and protected species; these ecosystems range from the high peaks of the mountain ranges of the Central System to the river valleys of the Upper Tagus or the alluvial plains of Toledo and Cáceres.

The Tagus basin can be divided into two large biogeographical zones: the Luso-Extremaduran province (center-west), and the Castilian-Mestrazgo-Manchegan province (center-east), with its natural boundary at the confluence of the Alberche. In short, this is a climatic-lithological differentiation: the limestone sector in the center-east and the siliceous soils in the center-west.

=== Vegetation ===
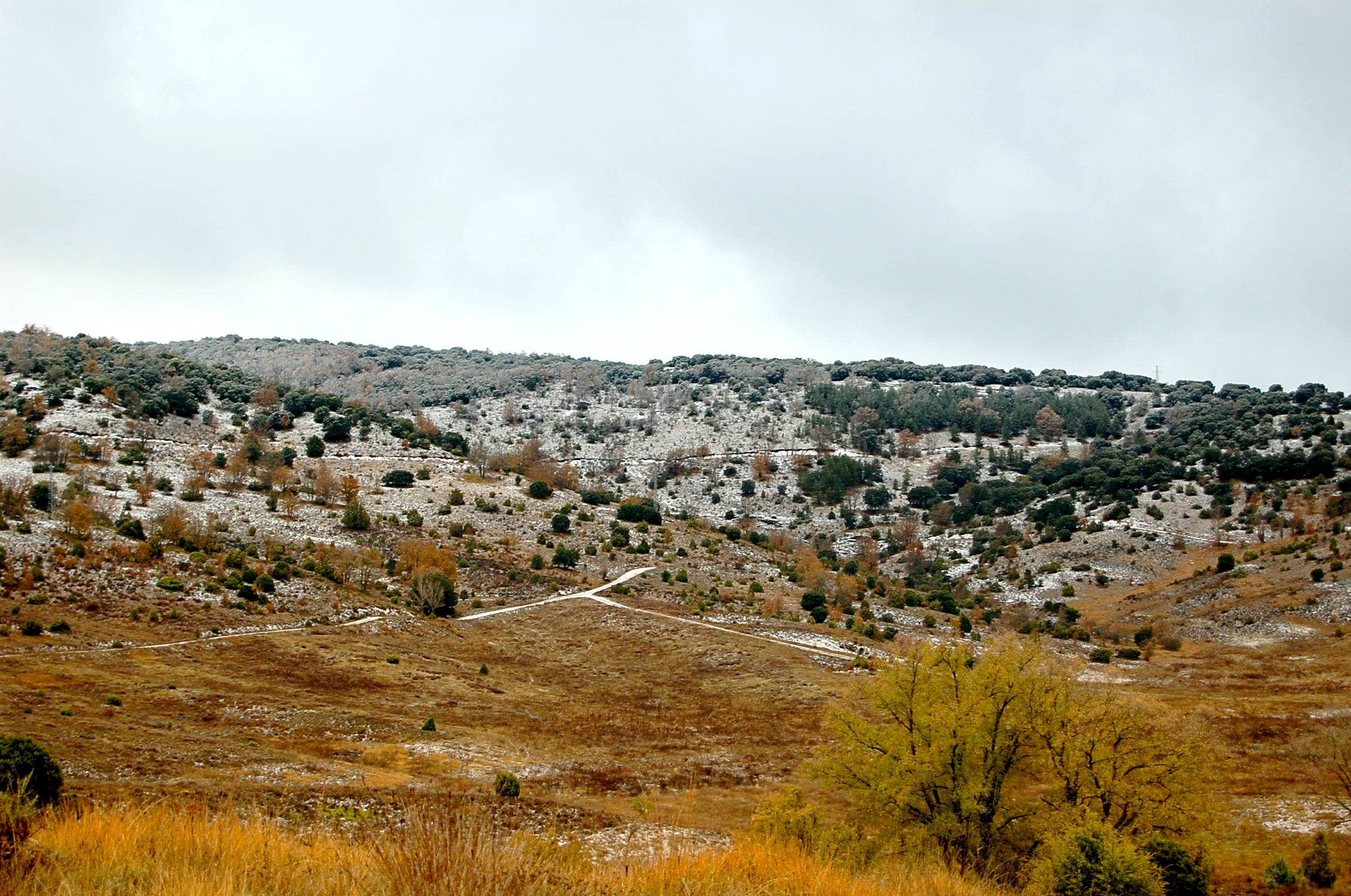
Vegetation levels in the Tajuña, (holm oak and Portuguese oak groves).

In general, the vegetation of the basin is as follows: in the high limestone mountain ranges, Serranía de Cuenca and Upper Tagus, there is a dense vegetation cover of needle-leaved forests dominated by Pinus nigra and Pinus sylvestris, pure or mixed; when climatic conditions are extreme, the pine forest is replaced by paramo vegetation or Juniperus thurifera juniper groves. Descending in altitude and with the alternation of sunny and shady exposures, there are two types of subsclerophyllous forests: Quercus faginea Portuguese oak groves in the valley bottoms and shady slopes and occupying the so-called alcarrias, (those of Torrecuadrada de los Valles, Brihuega or Jadraque are extensive), and mixed oak groves with Portuguese oaks and/or junipers in the sunny and rocky terrain, the main components of the Tajuña valley. Occasionally, and on sandstone lithology, there are oak or black pine forests, Pinus pinaster, such as in the Gallo canyon, Sigüenza or Poyatos, below these communities there are pure holm oak forests of continental character. The most frequent scrublands in this area are the boxwoods, junipers, replacing the pine forests at the highest or most exposed heights and the erizals. Underneath, there are steppe, Cistus laurifolius, sages and shrub pastures, as well as peat bogs and cervunals of altitude or linked to hydromorphic soils.

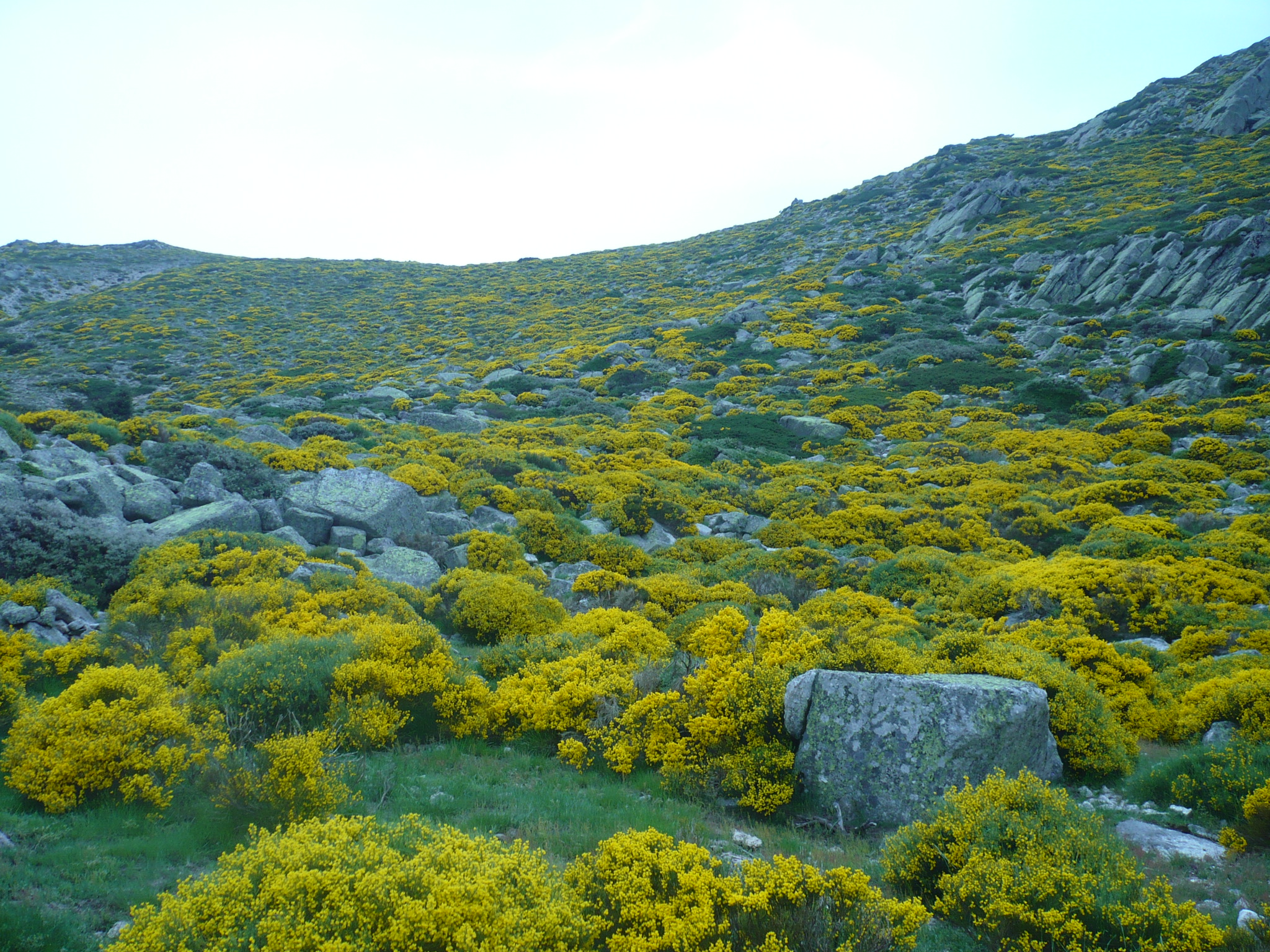
Pyornal in bloom in the Sierra de Guadarrama.

When thermicity increases, either by the type of substrate or by the altitude, the pine forest becomes Aleppo pine, Pinus halepensis, as in Sierra de Altomira, which is replaced by kermes oak, rosemary or even an esparto grass or esparto grove. To the north, the lithological change makes pine forests of Scots pine, Pinus sylvestris, frequent, as in the Sierra de Pela and Sierra de Ayllón, or the important pine forests of the Lozoya Valley and the upper basin of the Guadarrama and Aulencia rivers. Below, the domain of the Quercus pyrenaica Pyrenean oak groves begins, in Sierra de Ayllón, Sierra de Somosierra, Sierra de Guadarrama, part of Sierra de Gredos, Sierra de Gata and Sierra de Béjar; either by the action of man or by climatic-edaphic conditions, the oak grove is replaced by Erica australis heaths (Somosierra-Ayllón and center-west of Gredos, Béjar and Gata), or by Cytisus scoparius or Genista cinerea broom groves (Sierra de Guadarrama and eastern Gredos). At altitude, above the forest limit, the scrub is Cytisus oromediterraneus and Echinospartum barnadesii.

To the south, already in the middle of the evaporitic depression of the Tagus, the gypsophilous scrublands appear, so exclusive and rich in endemic and vicariant species, which extend from the foothills of the Tagus in the Almoguera Reservoir and reach past Aranjuez and Borox, being also present in the lower basins of the Jarama, Tajuña or Manzanares. As a link between the gypsiferous substrates and the marly and calcareous ones, we find the esparto-rosemary and kermes oak groves.

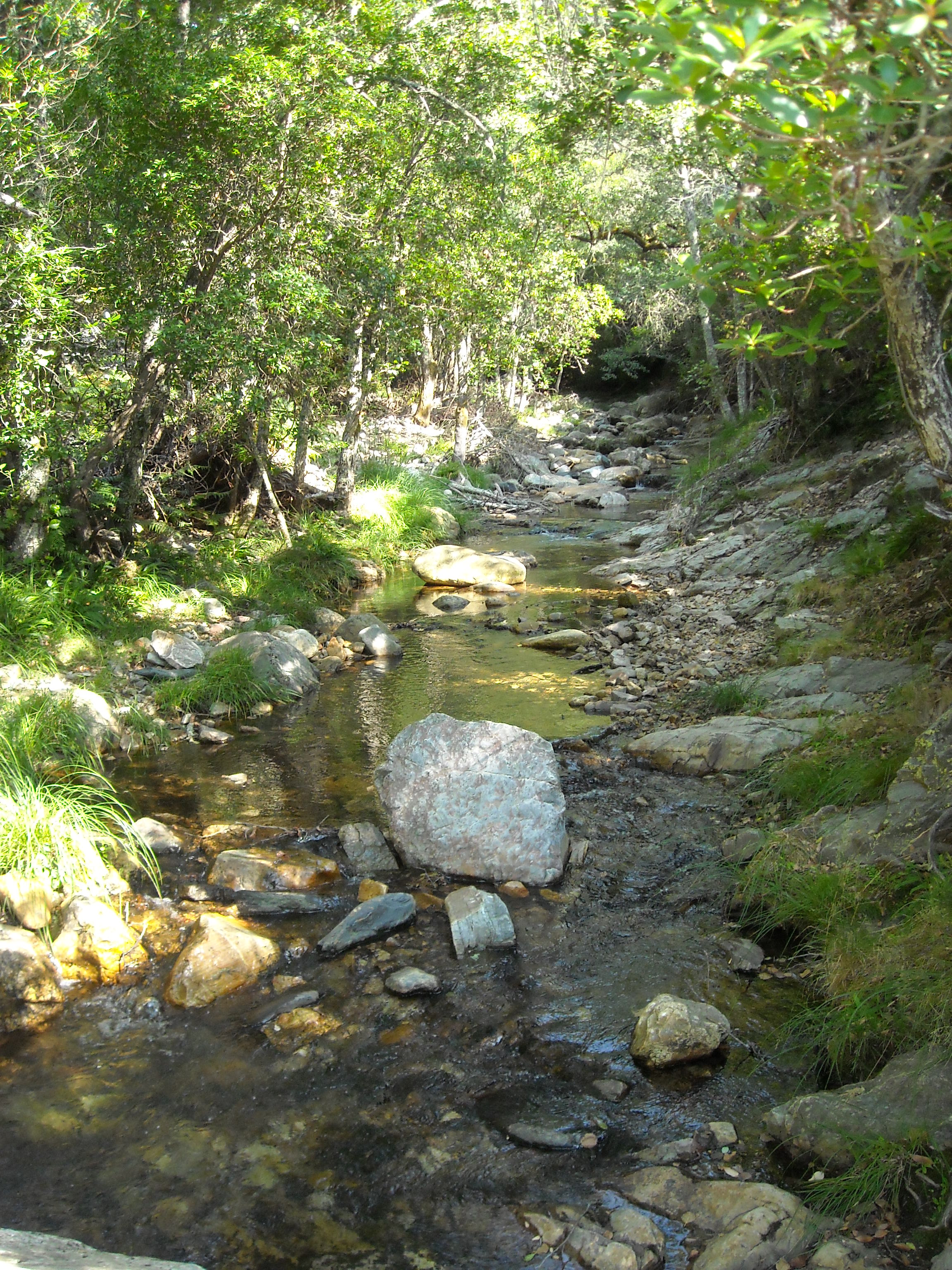
Batuecas riverbed.

Descending in altitude from the Central System or the Montes de Toledo we enter the domain of the holm oak forest and the further west we move, the holm oak forest gives way to the cork oak grove, a typical sclerophyllous community of clear Atlantic influence. These holm oak groves are replaced by various types of scrubland, from the gorse and thyme groves of the Alcarrias, passing through the gum rockrose shrubs with Spanish lavender and thyme of the Sierra de Guadarrama or Montes de Toledo, by the broom groves of Cytisus multiflorus, by the thickets of basil-leaved rock rose and other low rock-roses, or by the extensive retama groves of Retama sphaerocarpa frequent in the plateau of Toledo and southern regions of the Community of Madrid.

The southern slopes of the Sierra de Guadarrama and Sierra de Gredos are home to important pine forests of cluster pine, Pinus pinaster, stone pine, Pinus pinea, and relicts of black pine, Pinus nigra, the latter two species mainly in Gredos and in the Cofio–Alberche basin; among these stands alternate Spanish chestnut forests (Upper Hurdano, Peña de Francia, Las Batuecas, Tiétar, Valle del Jerte), Quercus broteroi Portuguese-oak groves (Upper Ibor, Almonte, Gébalo, Salor, etc.).

To the west of Toledo and east of Cáceres, Campo Arañuelo, south of Ávila, Tiétar valley, and almost all of Extremadura, there are holm oak and cork oak dehesas or mixed masses of them. The dehesas with livestock use are a refuge of the floristic diversity, characteristic of the Iberian west. Another type of dehesas, those of ash or oak (Fraxinus angustifolia and Quercus pyrenaica) are located in the foothills of the Sierra de Guadarrama and Sierra de Béjar.

=== Riverbank vegetation ===
To describe these plant communities of the Tagus basin, it is convenient to make a zoning that allows grouping areas that, while respecting the hydrological characteristics, present similar phytosociological characteristics.

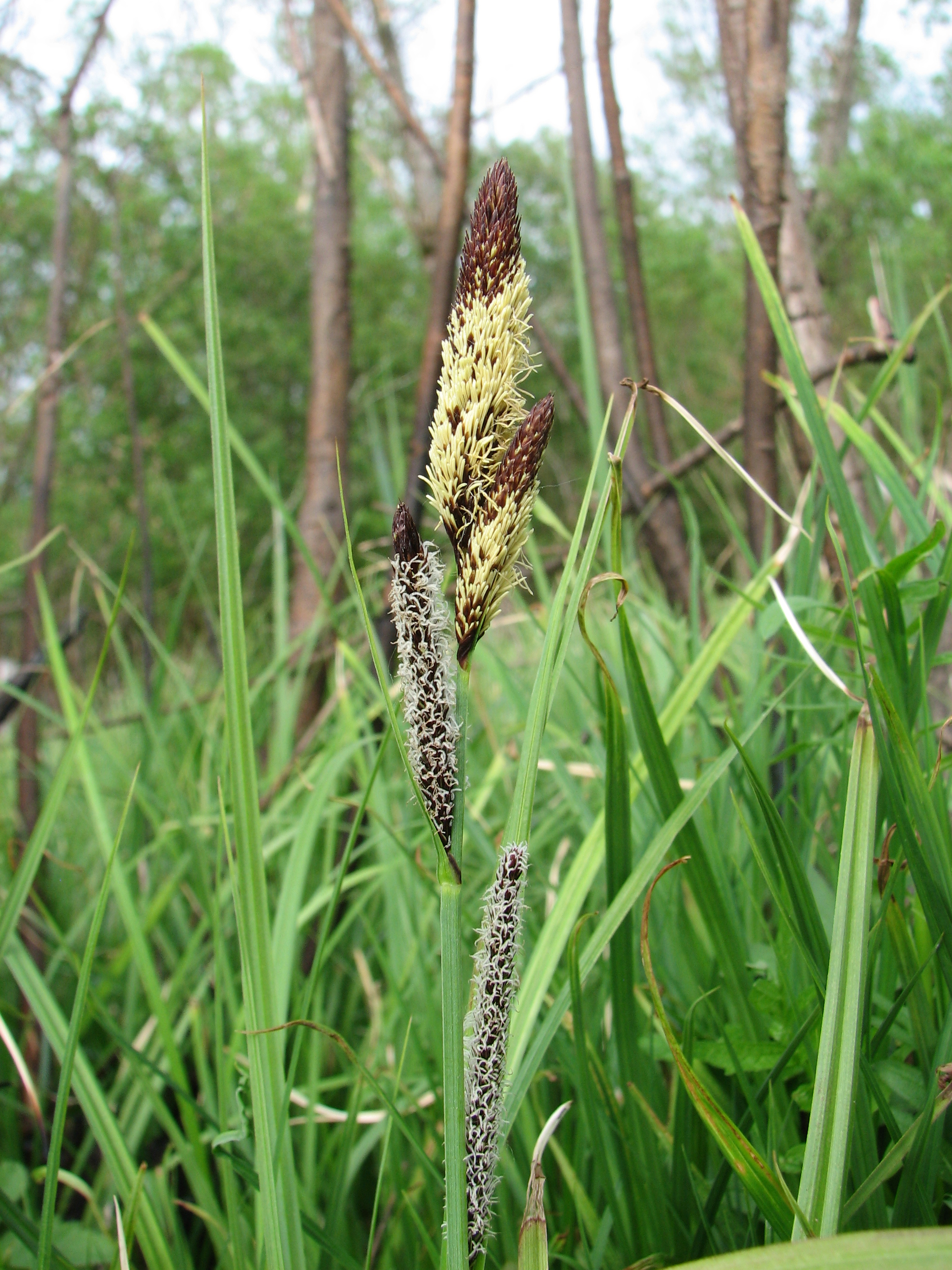
Carex acutiformis.

==== Upper Tagus ====
The riparian vegetation of the Upper Tagus is characterized by the almost continuous presence of two types of willow groves of calcareous character, one of arboreal size that occupies the fresh banks with good soil in areas of medium and high mountains and another of shrubby character that usually occupies secondary channels, margins and alluvial beds with a high water table in areas of medium mountains and foothills.

The first of the willow groves, generally corresponding to the Salicetum purpureo-albae association, is composed of one or two bands of vegetation, conditioned by the profile of the valley, where willows such as Salix atrocinerea, Salix alba, Salix fragilis or Salix neotricha dominate. They are usually accompanied by other tree species such as Fraxinus angustifolia, Populus nigra and alba, Corylus avellana or Cornus sanguinea, always surrounded by a thorny border of brambles and roses; within their courtship appear herbaceous plants such as Equisetum ramosissimum, Brachypodium sylvaticum or Carex acutiformis.

More frequent and widely distributed in the Upper Tagus are the calcareous shrubby willow groves, alliance Salicion discolori-neotrichae. They are generally dense formations, the typical wicker beds, which occupy the secondary channels, banks and alluvial beds of hard water rivers and more or less irregular regime, with floods and low water, withstanding floods well; its characteristic species are Salix purpurea var. lambertiana and Salix elaeagnos subsp. angustifolia, the latter dominating in the cooler areas. It is common to find meadows-rushes and even reed beds of the Molinio-Holoschoenion alliance and isolated specimens of Populus nigra or Populus alba, as well as Berberis vulgaris, Viburnum lantana or Ligustrum vulgare. In other areas of the basin of lower altitude these willows form the first band of riparian vegetation. Examples are some stretches of the Tagus in Morillejo, the Hoz Seca and Upper Cabrillas streams and numerous small riverbeds in this area.

==== The Tagus between Bolarque and Toledo ====
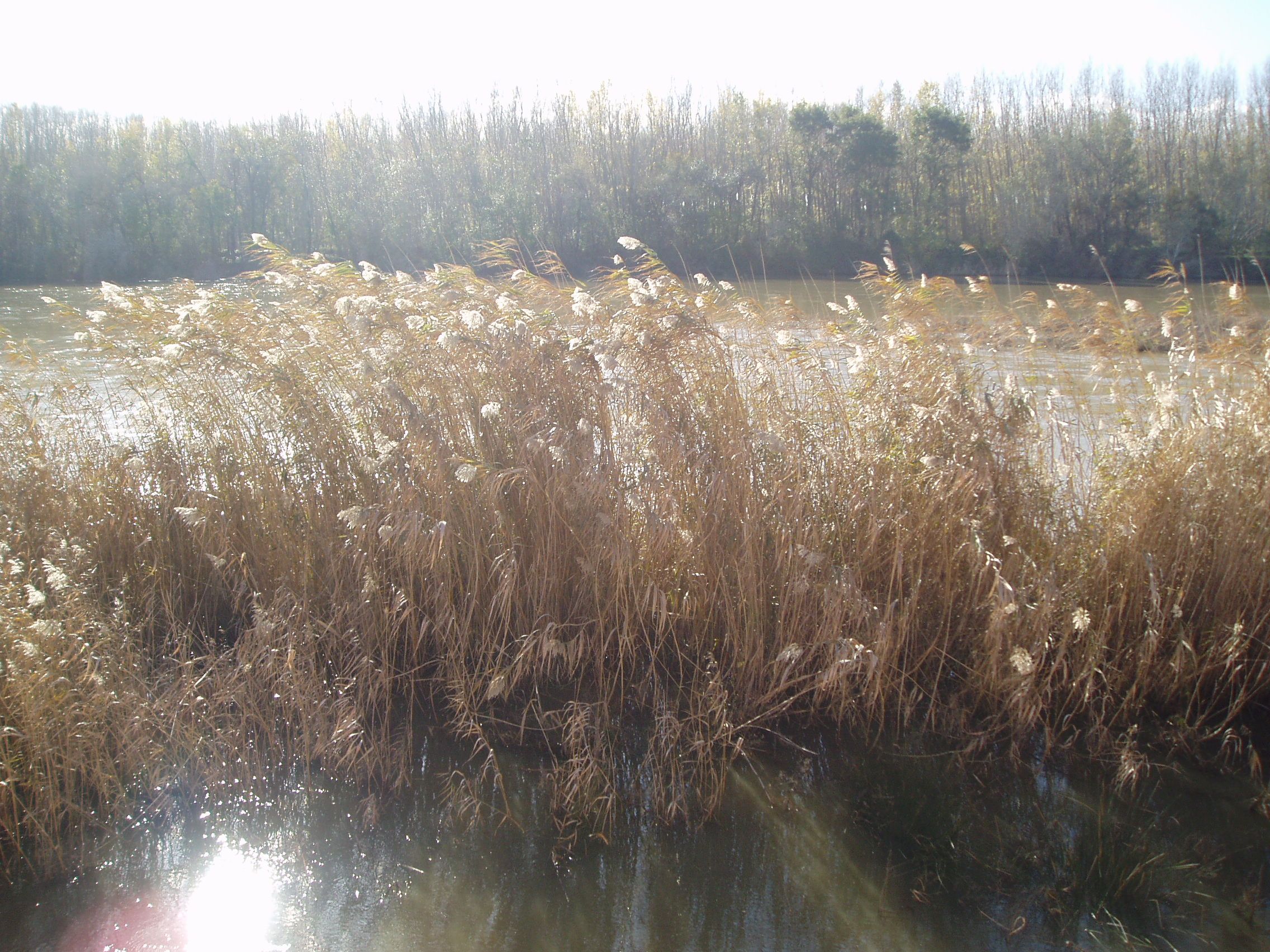
Reed beds.

Downstream of the large reservoirs of Entrepeñas and Buendía, the Tagus is a regulated river. In the first stretches, cultivated poplar groves dominate, but from the Bolarque and Almoguera reservoirs onwards, the riverbank vegetation changes drastically with respect to the upper stretch in several ways:

- The main river and some of its tributaries have hydraulic works that regulate their flow.
- It crosses a wide area dominated by evaporitic substrates, gypsum, which provide certain conditions of xericity and salinity to the soil.
- The climate is more Mediterranean, with less annual rainfall and hotter and drier summers.
- The riparian vegetation is reduced to a narrow band due to the agricultural use of the river meadows.

Poplar groves, also called cottonwood groves, are usually dominated by Populus alba, Salix alba or Populus nigra, and are located on hydromorphic soils, rich in bases and deep, silty or silty-sandy in permanent streambeds or other forms of edaphic hydromorphism. When well preserved, it is an exuberant forest of both horizontal and vertical stratification, with well-developed arboreal, lianoid, shrub-spiny and herbaceous strata. The most frequent type of poplar grove in this area corresponds to the Rubio tinctorum-Populetum albae association, where in addition to the aforementioned species there are other arboreal willows such as Salix fragilis, Ulmus minor or Fraxinus angustifolia. In the more xerothermophilous areas, as in the Cedrón stream, headwaters of the Martín Román stream, Algodor River, Tagus river in Estremera, the poplar grove is accompanied by tamarisks, Tamarix gallica and Tamarix africana, which become dominant in small meanders or abandoned riverbeds. The Martín Román stream supplies the Carrizal de Villamejor, one of the best preserved examples of helophytic vegetation, both in this brook, as in other slopes to the Tagus, on the right (Borox and Guatén streams) the accumulation of salts causes the appearance of a halophilic tamarisk.

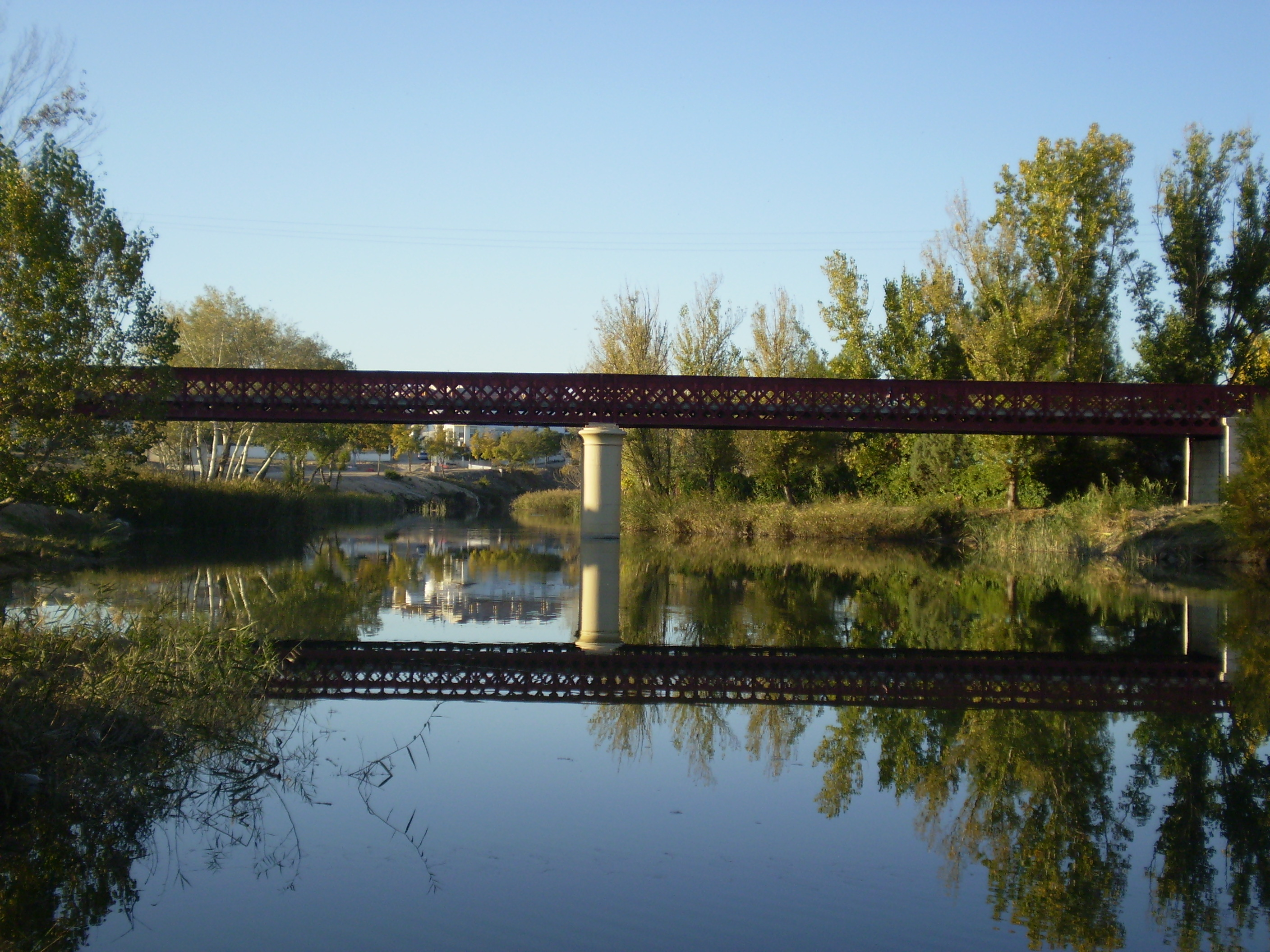
Riparian vegetation.

In some streams, the riparian vegetation consists of tayaral with halophilic elements such as Salsola vermiculata, Atriplex halimus, Sonchus maritimus, etc. The edges with temporary waterlogging are where there is the greatest originality and floristic richness with communities of hygrohalophilic quenopodiaceae such as Salicornia ramosissima, Suaeda splendens, Microcnemum coralloides, these examples are located in the Cavina, Salinas and Cuevas streams between Aranjuez and Yepes.

Another increasingly scarce element are the elm trees, the best represented, although in a very precarious state of conservation, are found in the Algodor River, downstream of the Finisterre Reservoir, in the headwaters and slopes of the Martín Román stream where specimens of boxthorn, Flueggea tinctoria endemism luso-extremeño, are beginning to appear.

Within the group of vines are frequent Humulus lupulus, Bryonia dioica, Tamus communis, Rubia tinctorum and Vitis sylvestris. The shrub stratum, when well preserved, is usually dense and rich in thorny plants such as Rubus spp, Crataegus monogyna, Prunus insititia, Sambucus nigra, etc.

==== Tajuña and Henares ====
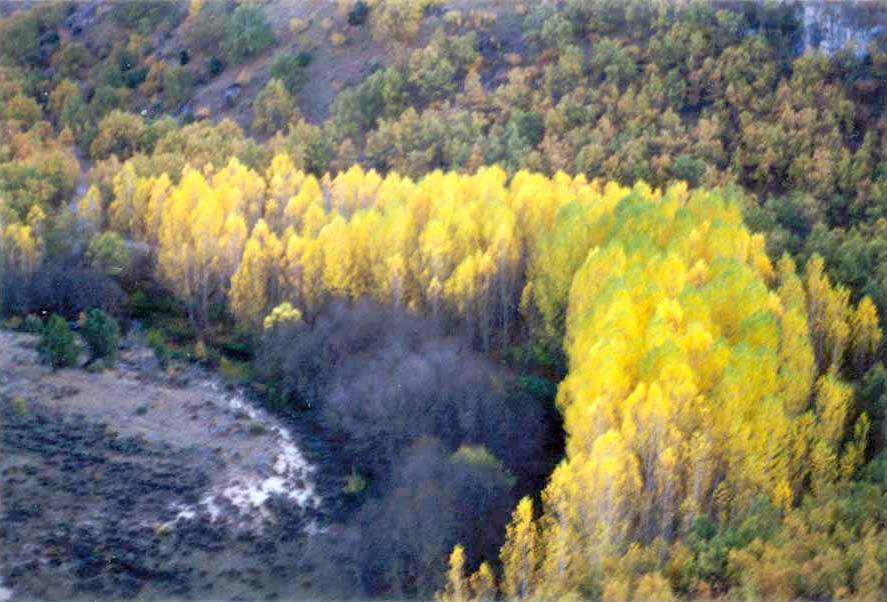
Tajuña river in Torrecuadrada de los Valles.

These two rivers have similar characteristics: they originate in a calcareous environment and cross detrital soils in some part of their course. The main tributaries are the:

- Tajuña River: which receives water from the Ungría and Peñón rivers, and from the Matayeguas and San Andrés streams.
- Henares River, which receives water from the Dulce, Salado, Hoz, Cercadillo, Frío, Cañamares, Bornova, Sorbe, Riatillo, Aliendre, Badiel, Torote rivers and Las Dueñas and Camarmilla streams.

In all the rivers that originate in calcareous soils (Bornova, Cañamares, Tajuña, Henares, Cercadillo and Dulce) there is a calcareous shrubby scrubland, black scrubland, as the first band of vegetation of the Rubio coryliforii-Salicetum atrocinereae faciation. In this willow grove, which can reach arboreal size, there are numerous thorny plants, Prunus spinosa, Rubus spp., Rose ssp. and scarce other shrubs, in some locations they are accompanied by Eurosiberian elements such as Populus tremula, Corylus avellana, Rhamnus catharticus and Ligustrum vulgare. In some places they are even invaded by Quercus ilex, Ulmus minor and Genista scorpius. Other more frequent species also appear in other areas of the basin such as Salix fragilis and Salix purpurea var. lambertiana, this is the case of the Upper Tajuña and some small adjacent watercourses (Prado stream).

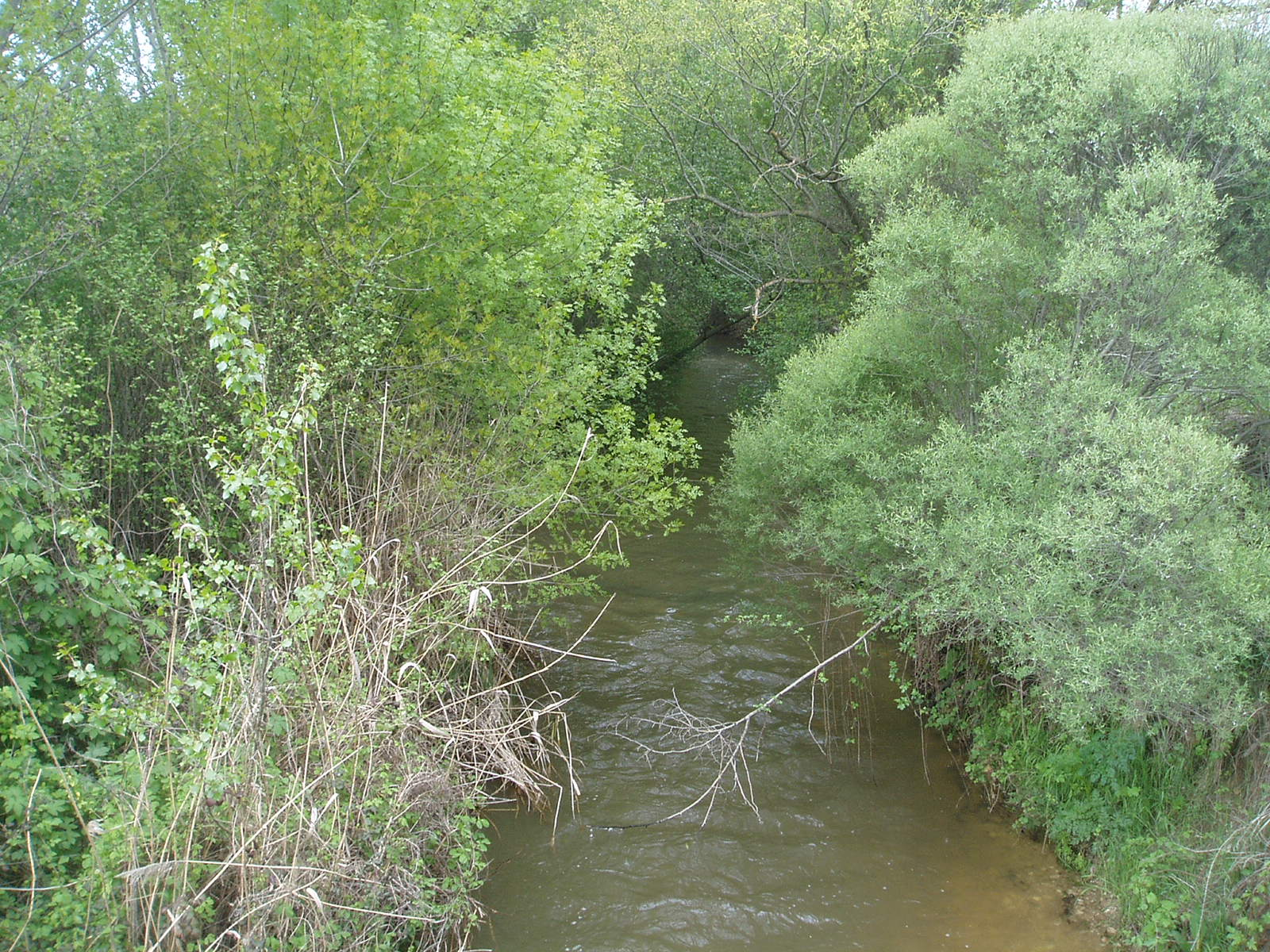
Riparian vegetation, Dulce River. Pelegrina

In the headwaters of the Sorbe, Lillas, Sonsaz, Riatillo and Frío rivers there are siliceous willow groves that can have arboreal habit in the Upper Sorbe or in the Riatillo. These are the same willow groves found further west in the Alberche, Jarama and Guadarrama basins, Rubio corylifolii-Salicetum atrocinereae, dominated by Salix atrocinerea interspersed with Betula pendula, Betula alba, Pinus sylvestris, Quercus pyrenaica, Taxus baccata, Ilex aquifolium, Fagus sylvatica or Populus tremula. Under this canopy are usually found stands of Erica arborea and a notable representation of ferns, especially abundant, Urtica dioica; it is also common to find stands of Fragaria vesca, Digitalis purpurea and Sorbus aucuparia. When the direct influence of the altitude and the more humid climate of the headwaters of these rivers is abandoned, the sauceda is impoverished in tree species and if the conditions of xericity increase, specimens of Erica scoparia can be found, as in the Sorbe and the Riatillo.

As important floristic curiosities, there are the oligotrophic alder groves of the Bornoba and Sorbe rivers upstream of the Alcorlo and Beleña reservoirs respectively, belonging to the association Galio broteriani-Alnetum glutinosae, (the Gredense alder groves), and are composed by species such as Carex elata ssp. reuteriana, Erica arborea, Prunella vulgaris, Viola riviniana, Wahlenbergia hederacea, Prunus avium, etc. They are narrow woods along the river bed dominated by alder, Alnus glutinosa. Sometimes there is a small band of shrubby willow grove in front, while towards the interior they are in contact with ash and Pyrenean oak groves.

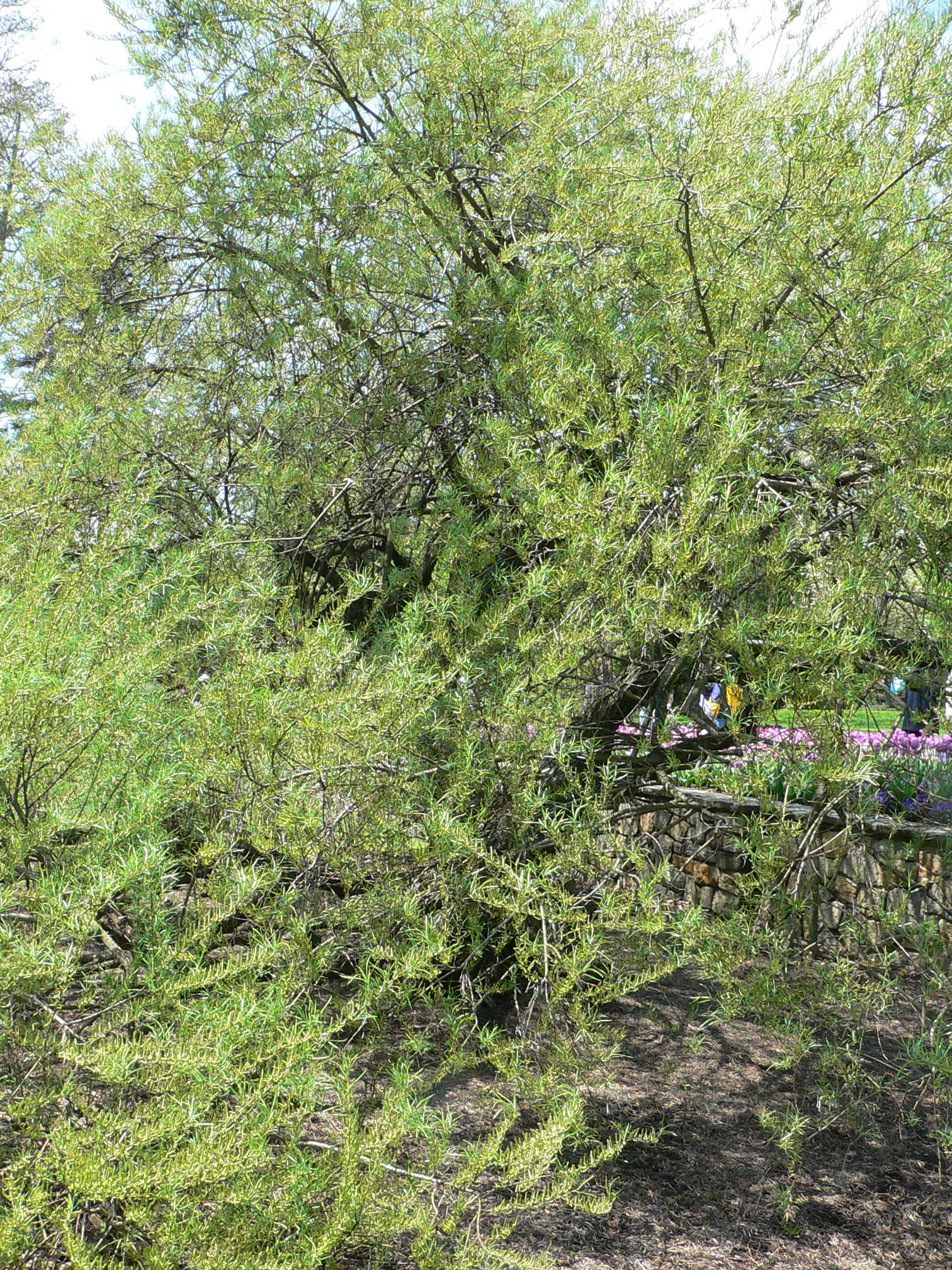
Salix elaeagnos.

Below these alder groves, in the Henares and Sorbe rivers, there are mesotrophic alder groves of Salici rubentis-Alnetum glutosinae, accompanied by Salix alba and Salix rubens and often Tamarix gallica, Salix purpurea and other calcareous species such as Cephalanthera rubra, Cornus sanguinea or Humulus lupulus, being replaced, when the original composition is altered, by willow and poplar groves with Salix salviifolia, Salix elaeagnos and Salix purpurea.

At lower altitudes ash and poplar groves dominate, the former, with red osiers and dogwoods (Cornus sanguineae-Fraxinetum angustifoliae), are frequent in the lower reaches of the rivers Frío, Hoz, Dulce, Salado, Tajuña and the upper reaches of the Badiel, These ash woods prefer steep topographies that limit the rate of evapotranspiration and when well preserved it is a pluristrative forest with other tree species such as Salix purpurea, Cornus sanguinea, Ligustrum vulgare, Prunus mahaleb, Sambucus nigra, various brambles and hawthorns and other species typical of the surrounding communities such as Quercus faginea, Juniperus thurifera, Bupleurum rigidum, etc.

The presence of tamarisk (Tamaricetum gallicae) which replaces the poplar and willow groves when thermoxericity is very pronounced or when there is a salinized water table. The second situation is described in some sections of the Salado, Hoz and Cercadillo rivers and the first is the most representative of the lower reaches of the Henares and Tajuña rivers. The best representation is the tayaral of Soto de Aldovea and the one that marks the lower Henares at its confluence with the Jarama, there are also remains of tayaral in the Tajuña. Tamarix gallica dominates, although there is also Tamarix africana, and sporadically there are feet of Salix alba, Ulmus minor and even Populus alba. If it is a typically xerophytic tayaral, it is accompanied by Artemisia campestris, Carlina corymbosa, Asteriscus aquaticus, Glycirhiza glabra, Retama sphaerocarpa or Asparagus acutifolius.

The remains of elm groves are also interesting, with a still important development in the Badiel, near the confluence with the Henares, in the middle reaches of the Camarmilla and Pantuerta streams. In a large part of its distribution area, the elm is replaced by a dense reedbed, as occurs in the Anchuelo stream or in the Camarmilla stream, or in the lower Tajuña.

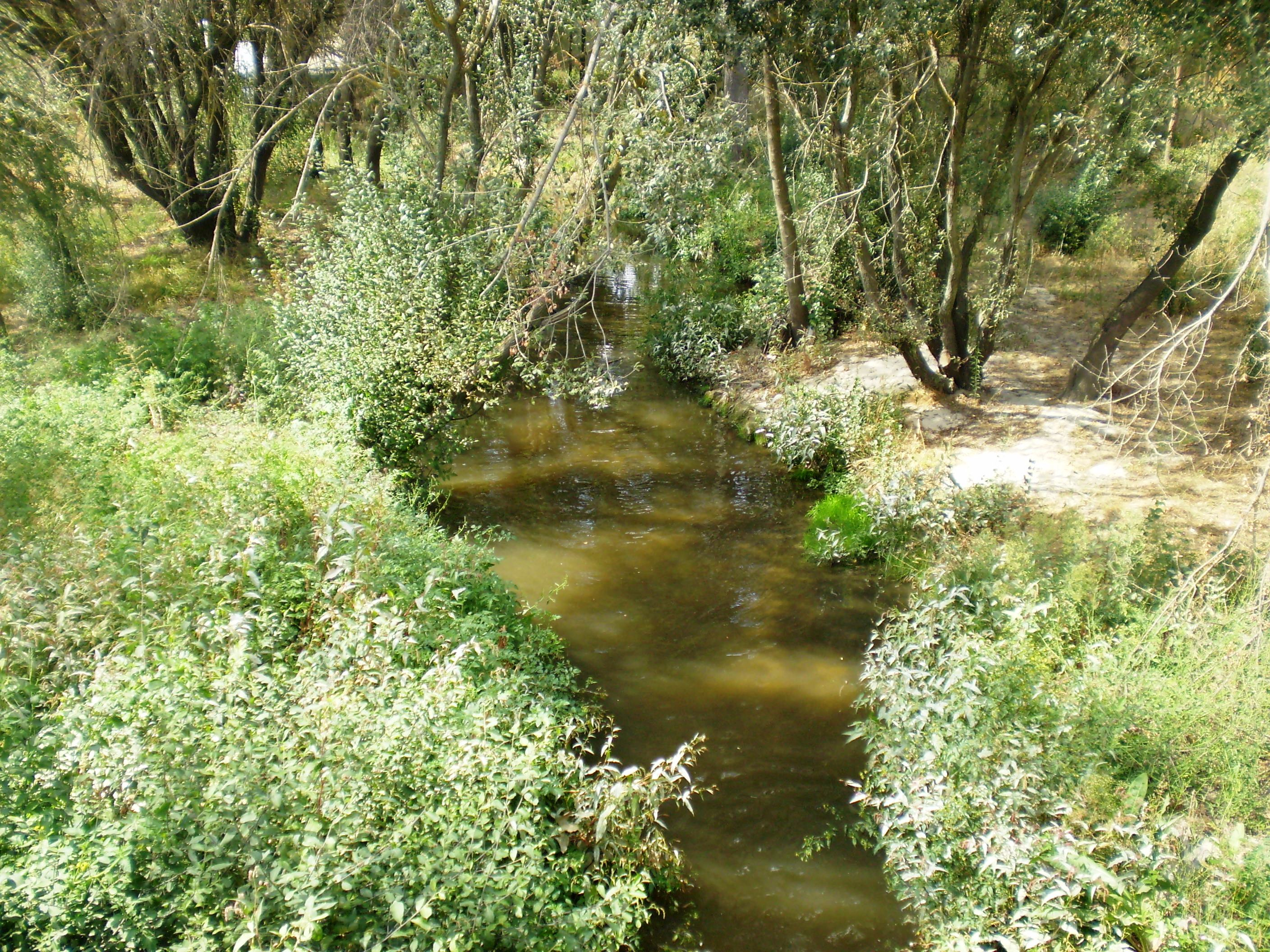
Viñuelas stream, riparian vegetation.

==== Jarama and Guadarrama ====
These two rivers have similar characteristics in a large part of their course, although the lower section of the Jarama crosses the Tagus evaporite trench. Both are born in a siliceous environment (Sierra de Ayllón and Sierra de Guadarrama), and flow through detritic soils of reeds (Jarama) and sandy soils (Guadarrama) in some parts of their course. The main riverbeds of the Jarama basin (excluding the Henares and Tajuña rivers) are: Jaramilla, Lozoya, Valle, Puebla, Guadalix, Veguillas, Navacerrada, Manzanares, Canencia, de Galga, de Vatorrón, de Viñuelas, Manina, Meaques, Culebro and de Trofas streams. And of the Guadarrama are: Aulencia river, Guatel river, Soto and Rielves streams.

The upper Jarama and upper Guadarrama have the same arboreal and shrubby black willows as those described for the Sorbe and Riatillo, the best examples are found in the upper Jaramilla and Veguillas stream, with occasional presence of Betula alba, Taxus baccata, Pinus sylvestris, Sorbus aria and Ilex aquifolium, the same occurs with the best preserved stands in the Valle river, Lozoya above the Pinilla reservoir, upper Guadalix or upper Manzanares (above the Santillana reservoir). In areas where the valley becomes very narrow, as in the Jaramilla, Erica arborea heath with Cistus laurifolius, replaces the willow grove.

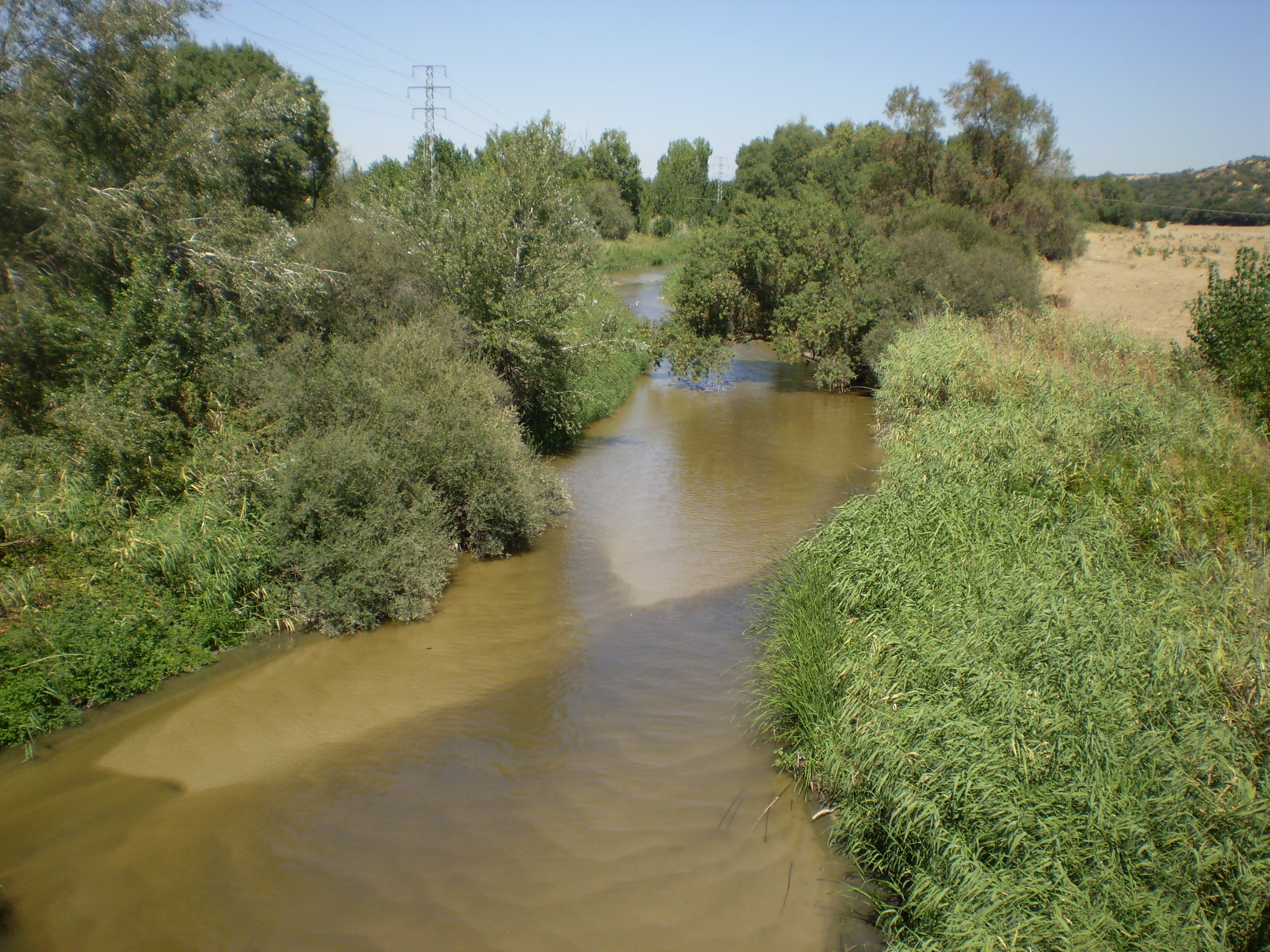
Guadarrama River near Batres, Madrid

The arborescent Salix salviifolia willow groves of the upper Lozoya, downstream of the Pinilla dam and up to the Puentes Viejas reservoir, Salicito saviifolio-lambertianae subas. caricetosum, in addition to the aforementioned willow, others such as Salix atrocinerea, Salix triandra or Salix fragilis are observed, appearing occasionally alders, birches, alder buckthorns, Pyrenean oaks or Portuguese oaks.

As the riverbeds approach the outskirts of Madrid they are altered in all their composition, being more frequent the reeds and rushes that invade the riverbeds. Even so, there are still good examples of poplar groves with white willow and ash groves with willows, as in the poplar grove of the lower section of the Trofas Stream to the confluence with the Manzanares, the section of the Manzanares downstream of the Pardo reservoir or the final section at its confluence with the Jarama in Rivas-Vaciamadrid, where there are also abundant remains of elm groves.

In these rivers, gallery ashes (Salici saviifoliae-Fraxinetum angustifoliae) are very frequent. This type of acidophilic ash grove is accompanied by a good number of Salix salviifolia as a consequence of the contact with the water of the riverbed and the shallowness of the water table.

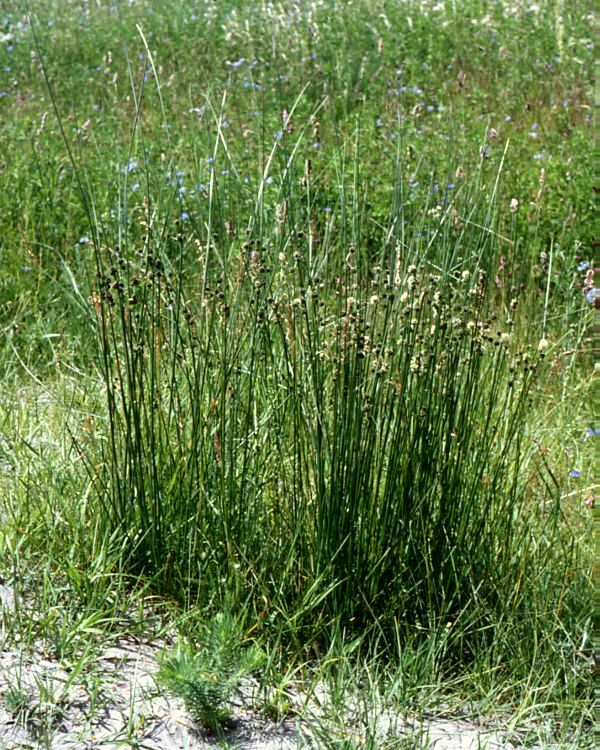
Scirpus holoschoenus.

==== Middle Tagus ====
This zone includes from the city of Toledo to the Valdecañas reservoir, here the Tagus is regulated practically continuously from the Villacañas reservoir to Alcántara, near the border with Portugal. In this area there is a biogeographical change (entering the Portuguese-Extremeño domain) and lithological change, with metamorphic and plutonic substrates dominating, alternating with some sedimentary substrates, which give the soil an acid or neutral character.

The first half of this area stands out for the encasement of the riverbeds in the sedimentary basin of the Tagus, with fluvial terraces of easily eroded detrital materials. The riverside vegetation has been modified by the presence of poplar production. Alternating with these, one can still find poplar groves of Populus alba, including species such as Fraxinus angustifolia, Ulmus minor, etc. Also noteworthy are the island forests made up of willow groves and ash groves. In addition, the willows are usually accompanied by a band of Scirpus holoschoenus roundhead bulrush and another of Tamarix gallica French tamarix, in the Torcón stream we find the first important formations of tamujar, Flueggea tinctoria, as riparian vegetation, increasing its presence the further west of the basin. At the headwaters of Chorro stream, a tributary of the Pusa, there is a sample of Betula pendula ssp. fontqueri birch (Galium broterai-Betuletum parvibractaeatum), accompanied by Fraxinus angustifolia, Sorbus torminalis, Ilex aquifolium and numerous scyphilous and nemoral plants (Scilla ramburei, Galium broterianum, Poa nemoralis). When this birch grove is altered, it is replaced by a willow grove with myrtle (Frangulo alni-Myricaetum galeae).

In the headwaters of the Gévalo River are remnants of Prunus lusitanica Portuguese laurel cherry shrubs, relict forests of the Cenozoic tropical flora, which can also be found in Extremadura in the upper, narrower and more sheltered stretches of the Ibor, Gualija and Viejas Rivers.

==== Tiétar and Alberche ====
These two rivers, of Gredense origin, give rise to some of the basins in which the riparian vegetation is best preserved, some sections being protected as River Reserves (Guadyervas) or as catalogued riverbanks (complete Tiétar, Alberche and tributaries of the right bank in Ávila).

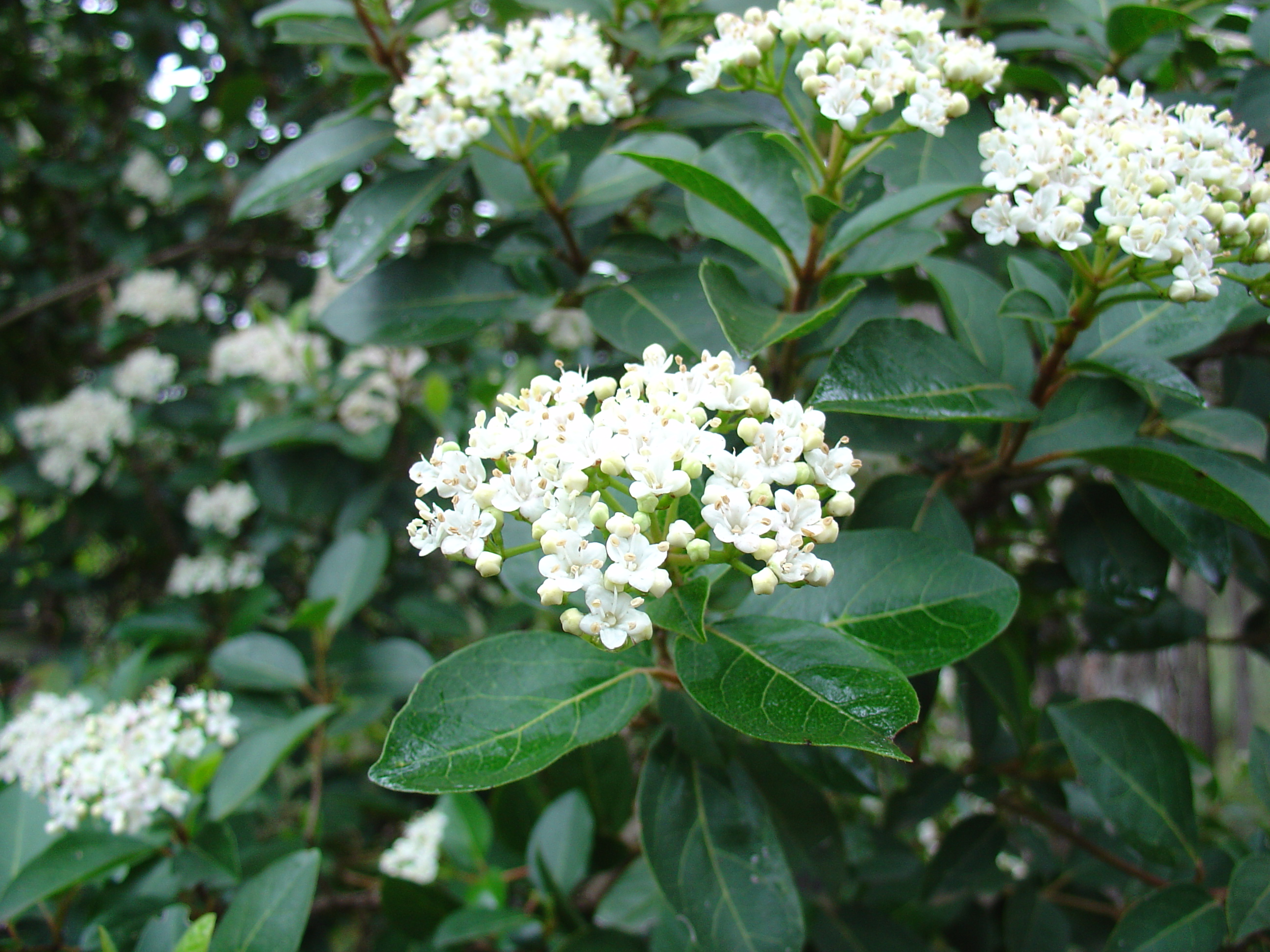
Viburnum tinus.

We are in the domain of the alder groves and shrubby mountain willow groves. The willow groves form narrow bands of Salix atrocinerea with the presence of Betula alba, Taxus baccata, Ilex aquifolium, Pinus nigra, Pinus sylvestris, Castanea sativa, Frangula alnus, etc. An excellent example is the willow groves on the northern slope of the Sierra de Gredos that flow into the Alberche, such as Garganta Iruelas and Valsaína (they also include Corylus avellana and Ulmus glabra), Lanchamala and La Yedra. The willow grove of the Garganta stream (Serranillos-Navarrevisca) stands out with an excellent undergrowth of Viburnum opulus and Prunus padus. In the higher areas, above the sauceda or where it cannot develop, Erica arborea heath can also be found as riparian vegetation.

The alder groves can be divided into three types. On the one hand, the oligotrophic alder grove, very similar to the one that marks the upper Jarama, which is located in the Alberche river and its tributaries up to the Picadas reservoir. Behind this band, if the width of the valley allows it, an ash grove with willows (Salix fragilis) can develop. This is the case of the Alberche, Cofio and Garganta Iruelas alder groves, the Alberche alder grove between Burgohondo and the tail of the Burguillo reservoir being one of the most important examples in the Iberian Peninsula.

Finally, the Luso-Extremeña alder grove, where two differential species Osmunda regalis and Flueggea tinctoria are frequent, as well as the presence of Viburnum tinus, Erica lusitanica, Genista falcata and Acer monspessulanum. These are the alder groves of the southern gorges of Gredos.

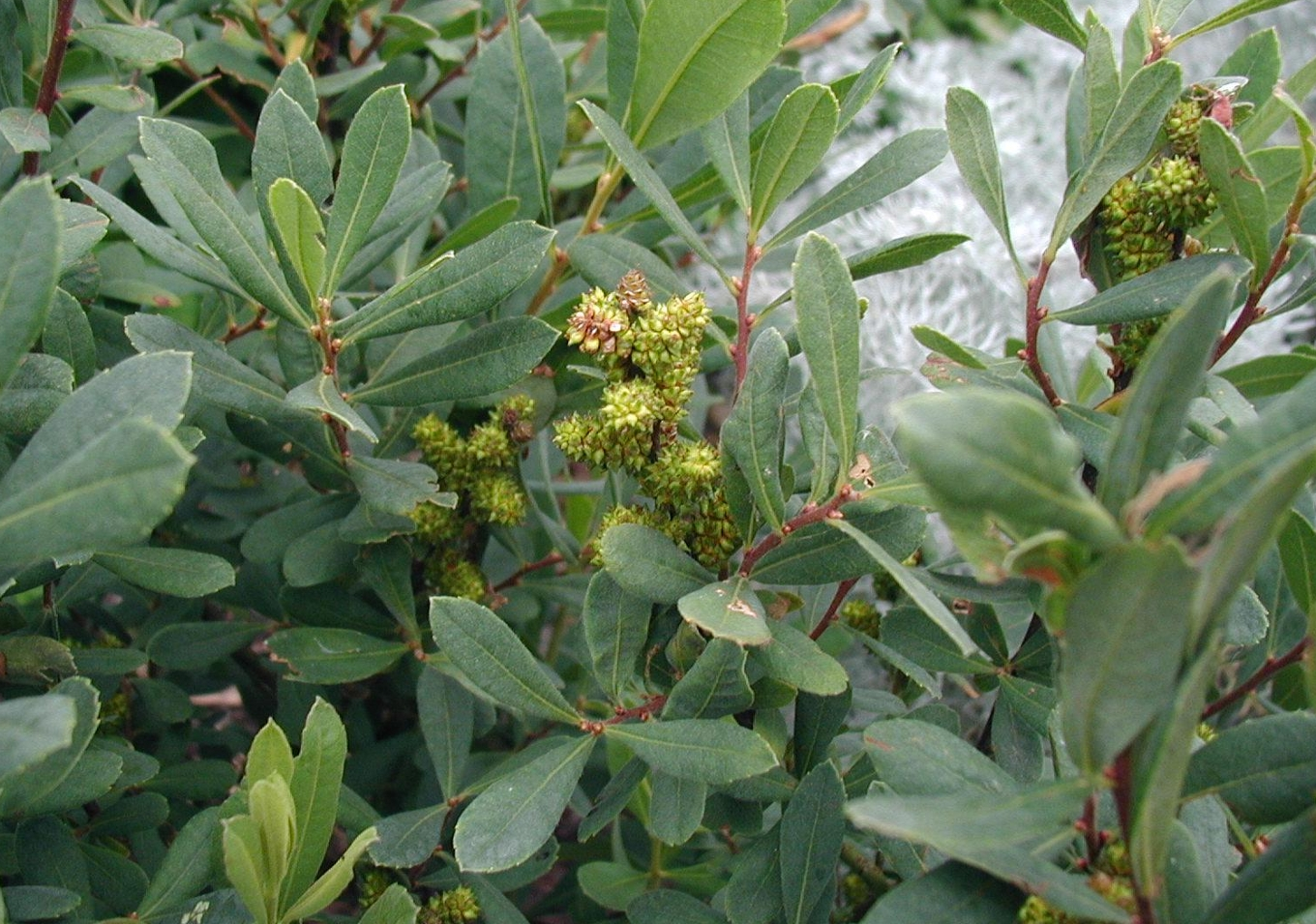
Myrica gale.

==== International Tagus ====
The end of the Tagus basin in Spain, constitutes the so-called international Tagus, border for many kilometers between the two countries. Spanish tributaries in this area are the Aburrel, the Aurela and the Sever, as well as the Salor. In Portugal the Sever river and the Erges river.

This area preserves very good examples of riparian forests, within the riverbed (in the channels that dry out in the low water) there is a tamujar sometimes accompanied by bog-myrtle, Myrica gale, which gives way to an alder grove in permanent contact with the water, just behind this, and even alternating with it, there is a willow grove that further away from the bank connects with the poplar of Populus nigra. Where there is an alluvial plain there is also an ash grove (Ficario ranunuculoidis-Fraxinetum angustifoliae), behind it, a series of phreatophytic communities dominated by rushes of roundhead bulrush, Scirpus holoschoenus, and a seasonal sub-humid grassland.

=== Fauna ===
The great diversity of relief and vegetation allows the existence of a rich and varied fauna. In the Tagus basin we can observe, within the group of vertebrates, about 66 species of mammals, 198 nesting birds, 26 reptiles, 18 amphibians and 29 fish, including numerous emblematic species of great value in the autonomous, state and international level.

In addition to the fauna closely linked to aquatic ecosystems, the Tagus basin is home to the best populations of the black vulture, Aegypius monachus, in Spain and Europe, as well as the Iberian imperial eagle, Aquila adalberti, an Iberian endemism well represented in the basin, and finally the Iberian lynx, Lynx pardinus, an emblematic species of the Spanish fauna and endemic to the Iberian Peninsula.

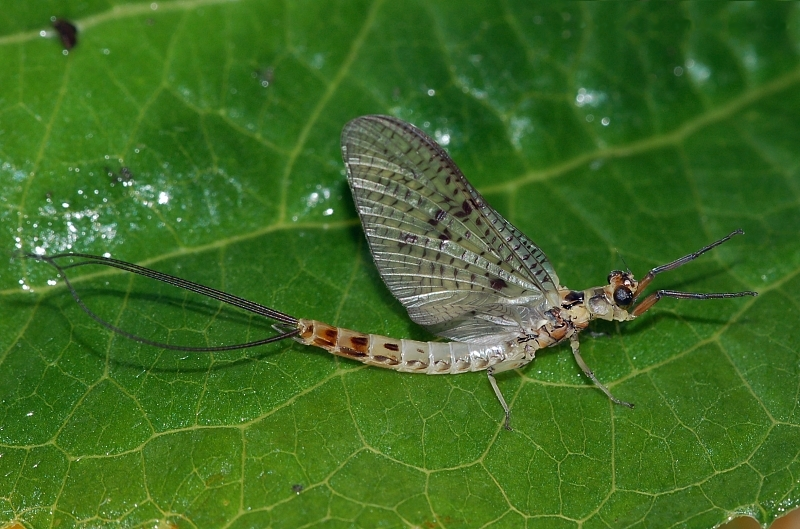
Ephemeroptera.

==== Macroinvertebrates ====
The so-called macroinvertebrates are represented by the taxa Insecta, Mollusca, Oligochaeta and Crustacea. These species are adapted to a series of specific conditions of the aquatic environment, occupying different stretches of the river according to their habitat requirements and water purity.

High mountain rivers and streams, areas of clean, oxygenated and cold waters, present a great variety and taxonomic richness with the usual presence of Plecoptera (families Perlidae, Leuctridae, etc.), Ephemeroptera (families Heptageniidae, Ephemeridae, Leptophlebiidae, etc.) and Trichoptera (Sericostomatidae, Glossosomatidae, Lepidostomatidae, etc.) in their waters. The Mediterranean mountain has a lower diversity, although relatively high, being well represented some heteroptera and trichoptera adapted to low current and temperate waters (families Hydroptylidae, Rhyacophilidae, etc.), the crustaceans Gammaridae typical in calcareous and mineralized areas and some plecoptera (family Nemouridae) and ephemeroptera (families Caenidae, Baetidae, etc.).

Macroinvertebrate taxa adapted to the aquatic environment present in the Tagus basin and included in the different red books or inventories that have some type of national or international protection:

Macroinvertebrates in Red Books
Species	Common name	Distribution	Description	EC (Note: Worldwide conservation status (not exclusive to the Iberian Peninsula) of the species according to the IUCN Red List: : Extinct; : Extinct in the wild (only in captivity); : Critically Endangered; : Endangered; : Vulnerable; : Near Threatened; : Least Concern; : Data Deficient; : Not Evaluated)	Image
Hirudo medicinalis	Medicinal leech	In the basin it is cited in the vicinity of Aranjuez.	Distributed throughout the Iberian Peninsula, in clean freshwater bodies frequented by livestock. Threatened by habitat destruction due to the disappearance of possible hosts, water pollution, etc.	NT IUCN 3 1	
Austropotamobius pallipes	White-clawed crayfish	In Castile-La Mancha in rivers and streams of the Upper Tagus, Serranía de Cuenca and Montes de Toledo, in the Community of Madrid there are two populations in the Tajuña and Henares.	Distributed in areas with fresh water, oxygenated pore not torrential, slightly alkaline and rich in calcium, avoiding the eutrophication of the water.	EN IUCN 3 1	

Within the order Odonatos, three species included in the Habitat Directive are found in the Tagus basin:

Odonatos
Species	Common name	Distribution	Description	EC	Image
Coenagrion mercuriale	Southern damselfly	In the basin it is scattered in the Upper Tagus, Serrania de Cuenca, Valle del Jerte and some scattered locations in the Community of Madrid (Casa de Campo, Rivas-Vaciamadrid, Guadalix de la Sierra).	It occupies narrow streams with cold and not very fast water. Adults are frequent among the low vegetation of the banks or flying at low altitude over the water.	NT IUCN 3 1	
Macromia splendens	Does not exist	In some points of the north of Cáceres and Jerte valley.	They inhabit wide and somewhat deep rivers, with slow stretches that allow the deposition of sediments and the growth of lacustrine vegetation.	VU IUCN 3 1	
Gomphus graslinii	Does not exist	In the basin north of Cáceres and Valle del Jerte and La Vera.	Wide and somewhat deep rivers with slow stretches that allow sediment deposition and the growth of lacustrine vegetation.	NT IUCN 3 1	
Oxygastra curtisii	Orange-spotted emerald	North of Cáceres and Valle del Jerte.	Wide and somewhat deep rivers with slow stretches that allow sediment deposition and the growth of lacustrine vegetation.	NT IUCN 3 1	

Other invertebrates of interest in the Tagus basin are:

Other invertebrates of interest
Species	Common name	Distribution	Description	EC	Image
Lucanus cervus	European stag beetle	In the basin it is distributed in a dispersed form, in the Upper Tagus, Serranía de Cuenca, Valle del Jerte.	Typical invertebrate of deciduous forest environments.	NE IUCN 3 1	
Phengaris nausithous	Dusky large blue	Wooded areas of the Central System, Community of Madrid.	Humid meadows, in clearings of ash, beech or Pyrenean oak groves, between 1000 and 1400 meters altitude, with anthills of Myrmica rubra or Myrmica sabuletii.	VU IUCN 3 1	
Graellsia isabelae	Spanish moon moth	In the basin in the Sierra de Guadarrama and in the Serranía de Cuenca-Montes Universales.	Between 100 and 1700 meters altitude, following the distribution of the caterpillar's food plants: Scots pine Pinus sylvestris and black pine Pinus nigra.	DD IUCN 3 1	
Euphydryas aurinia	Marsh fritillary	In the basin in the Sierra de Guadarrama and in the Serranía de Cuenca-Montes Universales.	Feeds on vines in well-preserved forests.	NE IUCN 3 1	

Among the mollusks proposed by the Spanish Society of Malacology to be included in the National Catalogue of Threatened Species cited in the Tagus basin is included the hydroid, Neohoratia coronadoi, located only in the Jarama river, in the Canal de La Parra and in the Patones spring in the Community of Madrid. This gastropod is proposed as endangered.

==== Fish ====
In the Tagus basin, 29 species of fish belonging to the families Anguillidae, Salmonidae, Esocidae, Cyprinidae, Cobitidae, Ictaluridae, Siluridae, Poeciliidae, Centrarchidae and Percidae have been cited. Of this group of species, 16 are native and 14 are introduced. Of the native species, 2 are endemic to Spain and 11 are endemic to the Iberian Peninsula.

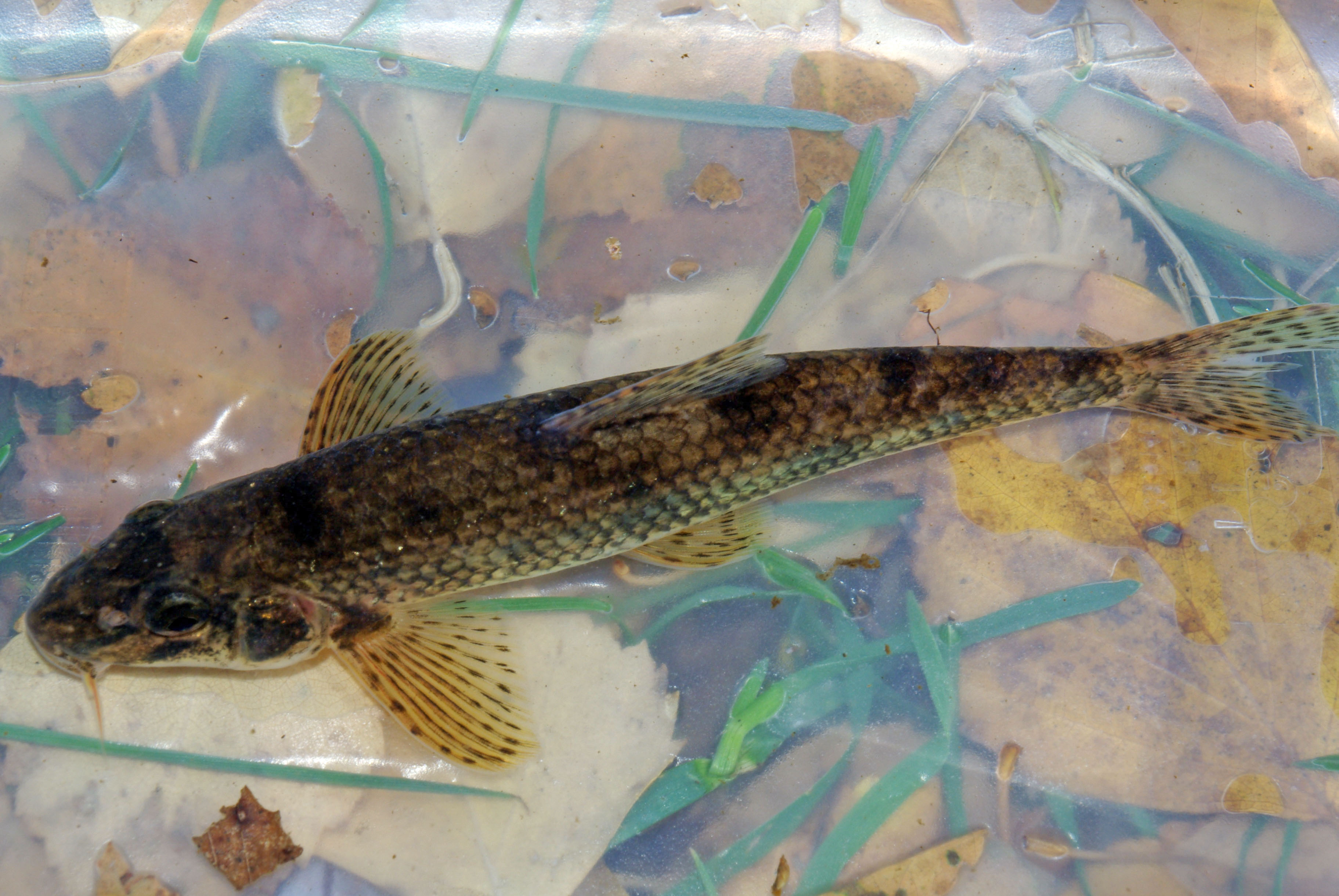
Gobio lozanoi.

The headwaters of the main tributaries of the Tagus and the main course itself, the only fish species that inhabits is the brown trout, Salmo trutta, a species that lives in fast, cold and well oxygenated waters. They are abundant in headwater areas, becoming scarcer as you descend in altitude.

Downstream from the headwaters, conditions are allowing, together with the trout, the appearance of other species such as bermejuela, Chondrostoma arcasii, colmilleja, Cobitis paludica and Cobitis vettonica, Northern Iberian Spined Loach, Cobitis calderoni, Iberian nase, Chondrostoma polylepis, madrilla, Chondrostoma miegii, Iberian gudgeon, Gobio lozanoi, cacho Squalius pyrenaicus, bordallo Squalius carolitertii, calandino Squalius alburnoides. The above species are all native to the peninsula or endemic to Spain (Parachondrostoma arrigonis and Cobitis vettonica). In slower and warmer waters, these species that become less abundant are joined by the Barbus bocagei and the Chondrostoma lemmingii and in lower areas by the Iberian barbel, Barbus comizo and the Barbus microcephalus. Finally, the tench Tinca Tinca, considered native to Spain due to the existence of fossil records from the Bronze Age, appears sporadically and occasionally in the middle and lower reaches of some rivers (Alagón, Jerte, Magasca, Guadiloba, Cuervo, etc.) and abundantly in ponds and dammed lagoons in the pasture oak groves of Extremadura, which are extensively cultivated for sporting purposes.

The species introduced into the rivers of the Tagus basin are fish adapted to the middle and lower reaches of the Tagus river and its more abundant tributaries, reservoirs and ponds; their presence is mainly due to introductions for sporting purposes and is generally scattered.

==== Herpetos ====
Eighteen species of amphibians and four species of strictly aquatic reptiles have been recorded in the Tagus basin.

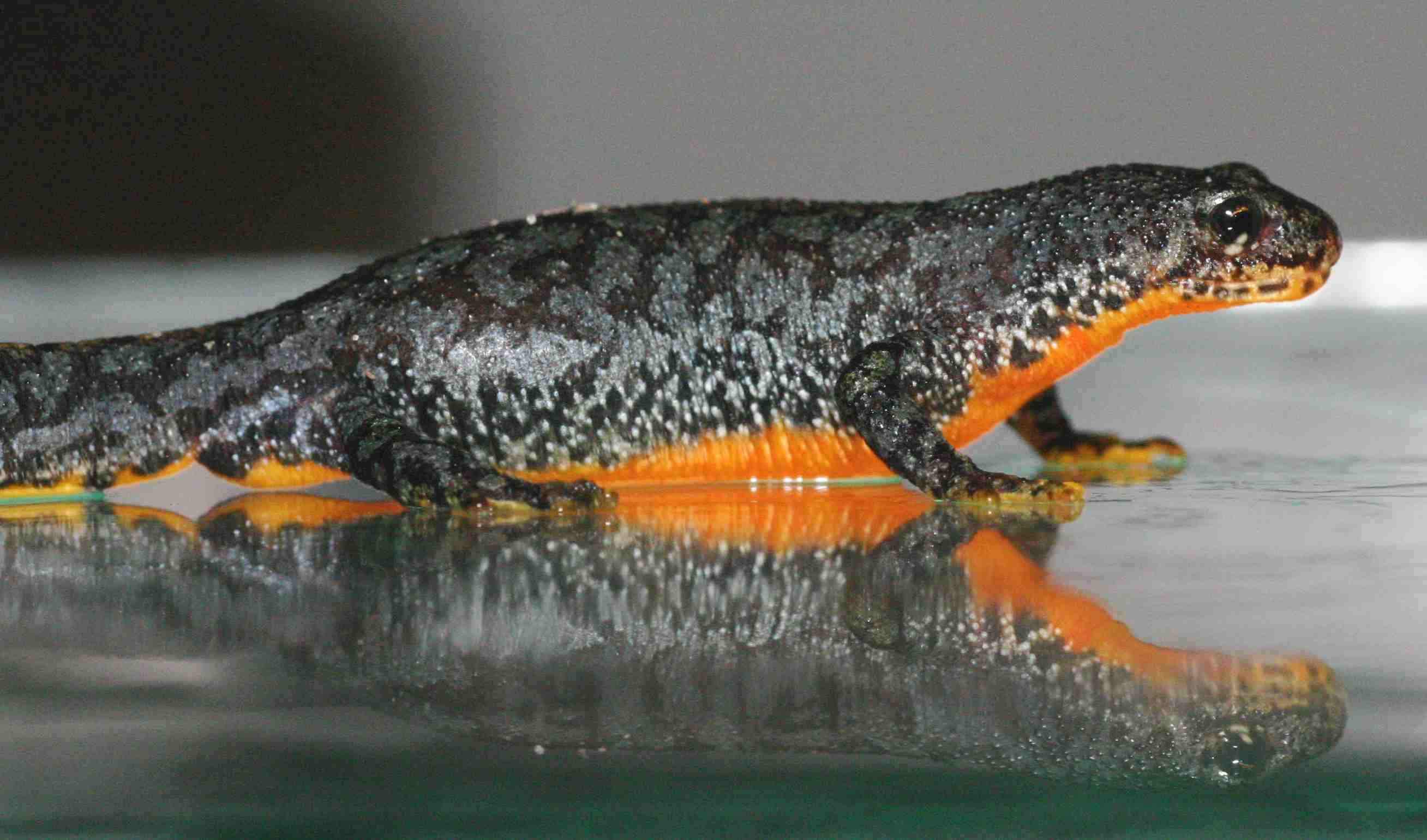
Mesotriton alpestris.

Six species of urodele amphibians are distributed, the gallipato, Pleurodeles waltl, is abundant in the basin, although it has populations threatened by isolation such as those in the south and northwest of the Community of Madrid.

The fire salamander, Salamandra salamandra, has populations threatened by isolation or habitat loss in Madrid (Miraflores de la Sierra, La Pedriza, Cercedilla, Pelayos de la Presa and Robledo de Chavela) and Ávila (La Adrada and Sotillo de la Adrada).

The alpine newt, Mesotriton alpestris, introduced in the Peñalara Lagoon, the Iberian newt, Lissotriton boscai, distributed throughout the basin except in the provinces of Guadalajara and Cuenca, being very abundant in the Sierra de Gredos and the Tiétar valley. The marbled newt, Triturus marmoratus, distributed in the Central System, the southern limit of its Iberian distribution; the Southern marbled newt, Triturus pygmaeus, recently taxonomically separated from the marbled newt, continues the distribution of the latter towards the south, being, therefore, the one that occupies most of the basin.

The number of species of anuran amphibians present in the basin is 12; the midwife toads present are the common, Alytes obstetricans, located in the most northeastern area (Guadalajara and Cuenca mainly) and some areas of the Central System, southern limit of the distribution of the species) in the north of Cáceres, Ávila and Madrid. In these last locations it comes into contact with the Iberian midwife toad, Alytes cisternasii, which is distributed towards the south, occupying a large part of the basin, where it is abundant.

The Iberian painted frog, Discoglossus galganoi, follow a pattern similar to that of the midwife toads. The Iberian spadefoot toad, Discoglossus galganoi, is widely distributed in the western area; and the Spanish painted frog, Discoglossus jeanneae, occupies the easternmost area of the basin (northwest of Madrid, Guadalajara and Cuenca) and its populations are threatened, depending on the state of conservation of the springs and fountains where they live.

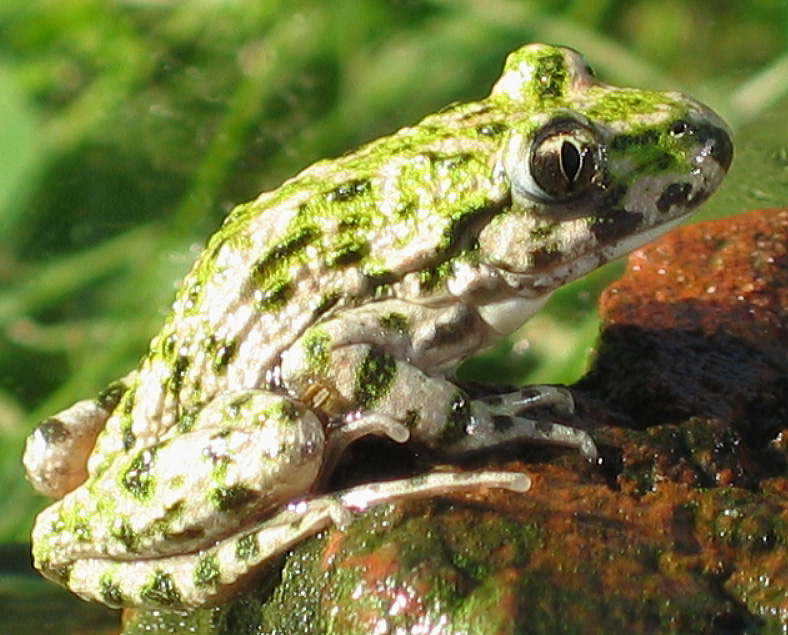
Pelodytes punctatus.

The Spanish spadefoot toad, Pelobates cultripes, is distributed throughout the basin, being more abundant in the dehesas of the western area. It is a species considered to be in recession throughout the country and has numerous threatened populations, especially in the Community of Madrid.

The Common parsley frog, Pelodytes punctatus, is distributed in the basin mainly in its eastern zone, Madrid, Cuenca, Guadalajara and Toledo, and is considered a frequent but threatened species.

The froglets of the genus, Hyla, the Mediterranean tree frog, Hyla meridionalis and the European tree frog, Hyla arborea, are both distributed throughout the basin, with the European tree frog extending more towards the east and the Mediterranean tree frog being more abundant towards the southwest. They have an area of sympatry in the Tiétar river valley, where sterile hybrid individuals have been located.

The Iberian frog, Rana iberica, occupies areas of the basin of a certain altitude, preferably above 2000 m a.s.l., in the Central System and in the Sierra de Guadalupe and Sierra de San Mamede in the south of Cáceres. The most abundant anurans in the territory of the Tagus basin are the common toad, Bufo bufo and the Natterjack toad, Bufo calamita and the Perez's frog, Rana perezi.

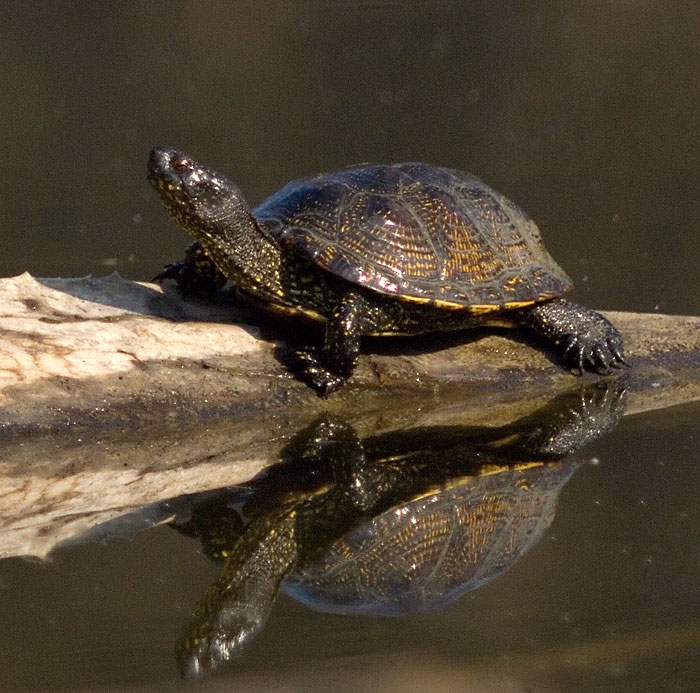
Emys orbicularis.

The group of reptiles adapted to aquatic environments present in the Tagus basin are the freshwater turtles with two species, the Spanish pond turtle, Mauremys leprosa and the European pond turtle, Emys orbicularis. Of the European pond turtle there are populations in isolated nuclei and with small numbers of individuals in Madrid, in the basal floor of the Sierra de Guadarrama and others even smaller in the western part of the Central System; on the southern slopes of the Sierra de Gredos, between Toledo and Avila and in some parts of the province of Cáceres. On the other hand, the best populations of Spanish pond turtle are found in Spain, being more abundant in the southern half of the country. This species is well distributed throughout the basin, being scarcer and more localized in the eastern area and abundant or very abundant in the middle and lower reaches of the main tributaries (Tiétar, Almonte, etc.) and other wetlands in the area. Another species of turtle existing in the basin is the introduced species, the Pond slider, Trachemys scripta.

The water snakes found in the basin are the viperine snake, Natrix maura, and the ringed snake, Natrix natrix. The viperine snake is a very common ophidian, using all types of aquatic environments in which it can have a high density of individuals. In contrast, the ringed snakes are more scarce and have fewer locations.

==== Birds ====
Within the group of birds, at least 53 breeding species have been cited in the area and which are closely linked to the riparian and/or helophytic vegetation of the rivers, lagoons and reservoirs of the basin.

The following is a list of nesting birds and the birds included in the Annexes of the European Community Birds Directive, including two introduced species:

NESTING WATERFOWL	IN THE TAGUS BASIN
Family Podicipedidae	Family Scolopacidae
Little grebe, (Tachybaptus ruficollis).	Common redshank, (Tringa totanus). Annex II.
Great crested grebe, (Podiceps cristatus).	Common sandpiper, (Actitis hypoleucos).
Black-necked grebe, (Podiceps nigricollis).	Family Laridae
Family Phalacrocoracidae	Black-headed gull, (Larus ridibundus).
Great cormorant, (Phalacrocorax carbo).	Caspian gull, (Larus cachinnans).
Family Ardeidae	Family Sternidae
Eurasian bittern, (Botaurus stellaris). Annex I.	Gull-billed tern, (Gelochelidon nilotica). Annex I.
Little bittern, (Ixobrychus minutus). Annex I.	Little tern, (Sterna albifrons). Annex I.
Black-crowned night heron, (Nycticorax nycticorax). Annex I.	Family Alcedinidae
Squacco heron, (Ardeola ralloides). Annex I.	Common kingfisher, (Alcedo atthis). Annex I.
Western cattle egret, (Bubulcus ibis).	Family Hirundinidae
Little egret, (Egretta garzetta). Annex I.	Sand martin, (Riparia riparia).
Purple heron, (Ardea purpurea). Annex I.	Family Motacillidae
Grey heron, (Ardea cinerea).	Western yellow wagtail, (Motacilla flava).
Family Threskiornithidae	Grey wagtail, (Motacilla cinerea).
Eurasian spoonbill, (Platalea leucorodia). Annex I.	White wagtail, (Motacilla alba).
Family Anatidae	Family Cinclidae
Gadwall, (Anas strepera). Annex II.	White-throated dipper, (Cinclus cinclus).
Mallard, (Anas platyrhynchos). Annex II and III.	Family Sylviidae
Northern shoveler, (Anas clypeata). Annex II and III.	Cetti's warbler, (Cettia cetti).
Red-crested pochard, (Netta rufina). Annex II.	Zitting cisticola, (Cisticola juncidis).
Common pochard, (Aythya ferina). Annex II and III.	Savi's warbler, (Locustella luscinioides).
White-headed duck, (Oxyura leucocephala). Annex I.	Moustached warbler, (Acrocephalus melanopogon). Annex I.
Family Accipitridae	Common reed warbler, (Acrocephalus scirpaceus).
Western marsh harrier, (Circus aeruginosus). Annex I.	Great reed warbler, (Acrocephalus arundinaceus).
Family Rallidae	Melodious warbler, (Hippolais polyglotta).
Water rail, (Rallus aquaticus). Annex II.	Family Timaliidae
Common moorhen, (Gallinula chloropus). Annex II.	Bearded reedling, (Panurus biarmicus).
Western swamphen, (Porphyrio porphyrio). Annex I.	Family Oriolidae
Eurasian coot, (Fulica atra). Annex II.	Eurasian golden oriole, (Oriolus oriolus).
Family Recurvirostridae	Family Emberizidae
Black-winged stilt, (Himantopus himantopus). Annex I.	Common reed bunting, (Emberiza schoeniclus).
Pied avocet, (Recurvirostra avosetta). Annex I.	Family Estrildidae
Family Glareolidae	Common waxbill, (Estrilda astrild). Introduced.
Collared pratincole, (Glareola pratincola). Annex I.	Red avadavat, (Amandava amandava). Introduced.
Family Charadriidae
Little ringed plover, (Charadrius dubius).
Northern lapwing, (Vanellus vanellus). Annex II.

During the winter, the number of birds that choose the aquatic biotypes of the Tagus to winter or that are passing through increases the ornithological population. In this way, birds such as the common crane, (Grus grus), the greylag goose, (Anser anser), ruff, (Philomachus pugnax), common snipe, (Gallinago gallinago), etc. can be observed.

Also in the gorges, ravines and slopes of river terraces nest large numbers of cock-of-the-rock birds, some of them of great ecological value as the Eurasian griffon vulture (Gyps fulvus), Egyptian vulture (Neophron percnopterus), golden eagle (Aquila chrysaetos), Bonelli's eagle (Hieraaetus fasciatus), Eurasian eagle-owl (Bubo bubo), peregrine falcon (Falco peregrinus), etc.. Finally, the black stork (Ciconia nigra), which nests in the least disturbed and inaccessible areas of the Mediterranean forest, river cuts or mountain gorges, always in the vicinity of rivers, lagoons or reservoirs where it can feed.

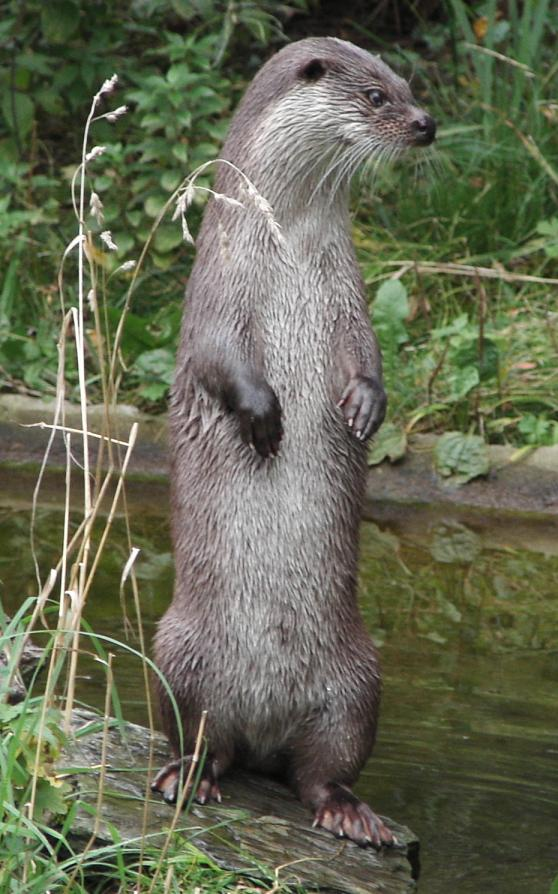
Lutra lutra.

==== Mammals ====
The mammal species directly related to the freshwater environment due to their aquatic or semi-aquatic nature in the Tagus basin are: the Eurasian otter (Lutra lutra), an autochthonous aquatic mustelid adapted to this environment, distributed throughout the basin, except in unfavorable or polluted waters; another mustelid present is the American mink (Mustela vison), an allochthonous species, which has colonized some areas after escaping from farms or uncontrolled releases.

The Pyrenean desman (Galemys pyrenaicus) is generally found above 700 m a.s.l., in streams and rivers of constant current and steep slope, in well oxygenated and clean waters. It is located in the headwaters of the Tagus tributaries, which originate in the Central System, in the provinces of Cáceres, Ávila, Madrid and Guadalajara.

The Mediterranean water shrew (Neomys anomalus), an insectivorous mammal with excellent swimming and diving qualities, associated with permanent and well oxygenated watercourses and in areas of high humidity.

Of the 23 species of bats that inhabit the Tagus basin, there is one that is closely linked to bodies of water, namely the Daubenton's bat (Myotis daubentonii), which feeds on invertebrates linked to the aquatic environment such as the winged phases of trichoptera, ephemeroptera, etc.

Finally, the Southwestern water vole (Arvicola sapidus), which is linked to permanent aquatic environments and can be found up to 2100 m above sea level, is scattered throughout the basin.

== Territorial distribution ==
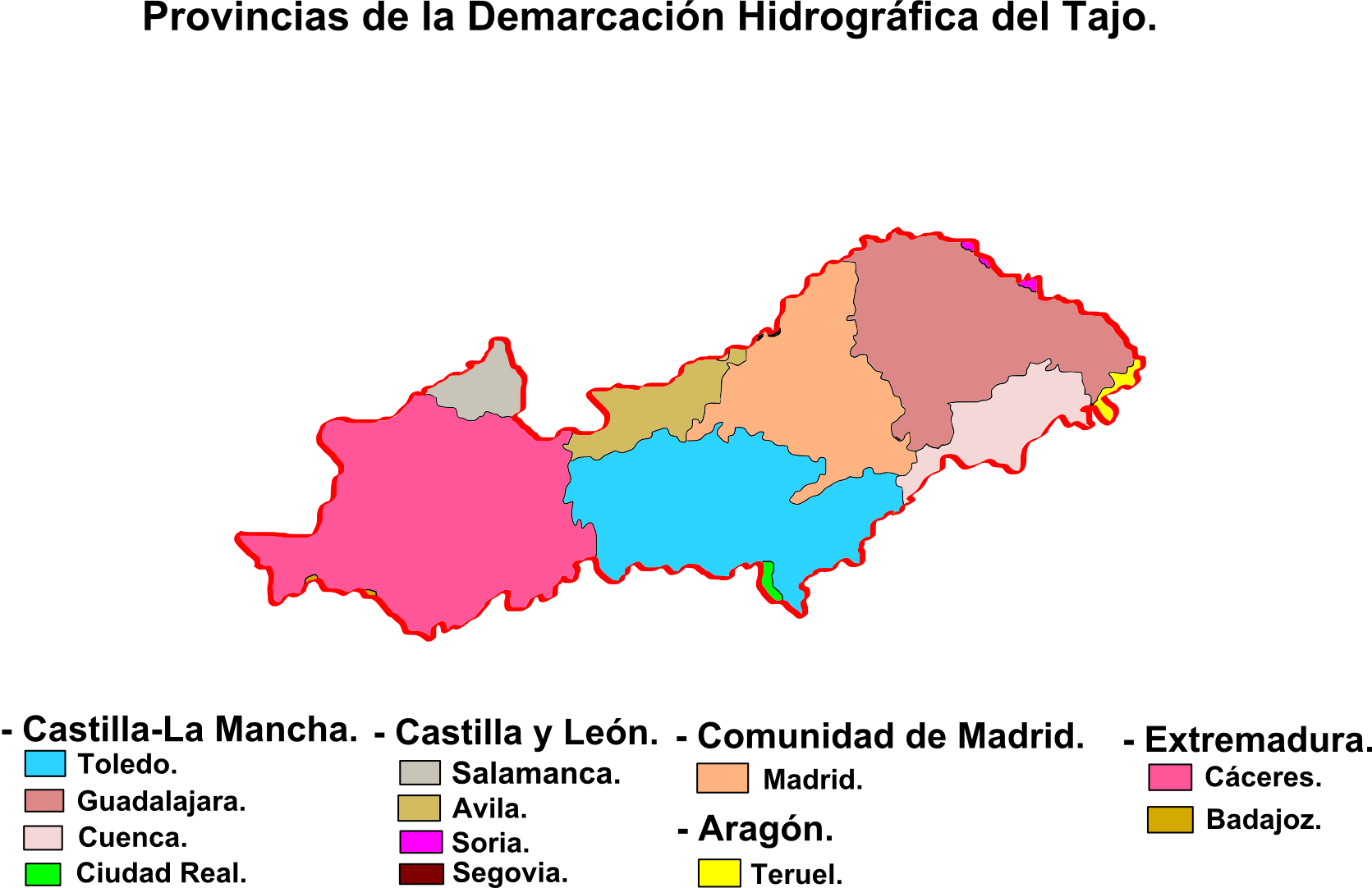
Provinces included in the Tagus basin.

The territorial scope of the Tagus basin, 55,645 km^{2} in the Spanish area, extends over five Autonomous Communities, totaling twelve provinces, as well as four provincial capitals within the basin, Madrid, Toledo, Guadalajara and Cáceres.

	Participation	in	the	basin	% Compared to	autonomies
Autonomies	Extension km^{2}	%	Inhabitants	%	Extension	Population
Castile-La Mancha	26,699	48	587,184	9.6	33.7	34.4
Extremadura	16,738	30.1	383,461	6.3	40.2	36.5
Madrid	7983	14.4	5,030,958	82.5	99.8	100
Castile and León	3987	7.2	96,320	1.6	4.2	4.1
Aragon	238	0.4	1190	0.0	0.5	0.1
Total	55,645	100	6,099,113	100		

== Hydraulic infrastructure ==
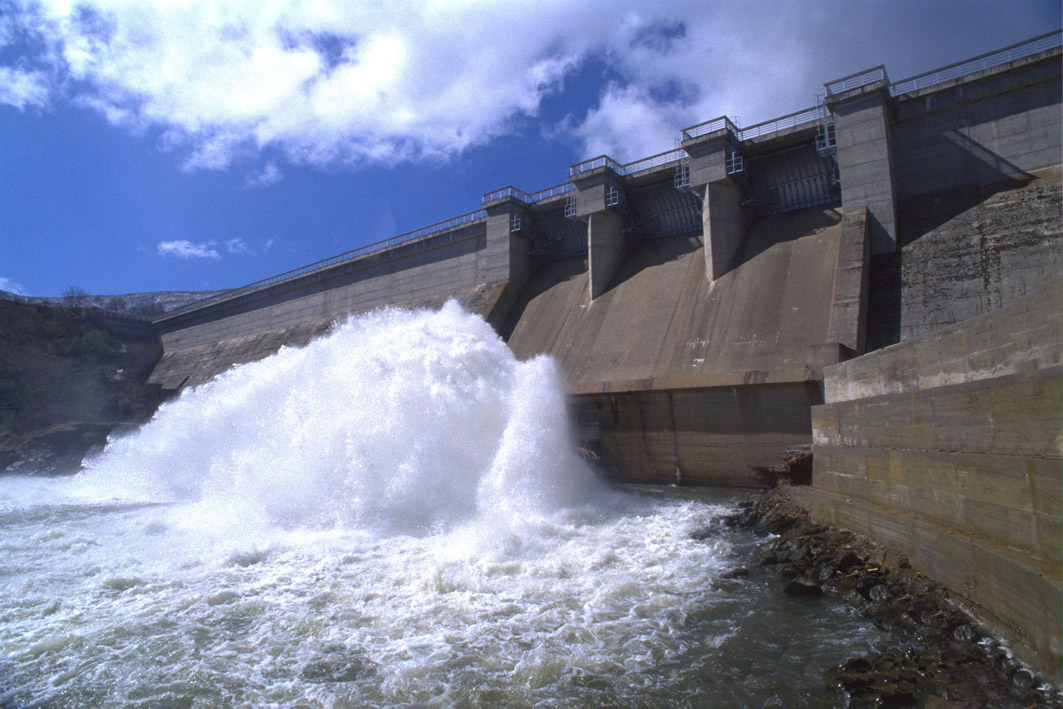
Pinilla Dam.

The National Water Works Plan of 1902, drawn up by the Corps of Engineers, included the works necessary for the irrigation of 181,850 ha in the Tagus basin.

In 1933, the year in which a new Plan was drawn up, practically none of the previously programmed works had been carried out, only the reservoirs of El Burguillo and El Charco del Cura, with an eminently hydroelectric purpose, achieved a regulation of the Alberche river and could allow irrigation in the area of Talavera de la Reina. This new Plan included the works not previously carried out, reducing the irrigable surface area to 110,000 ha, a limitation imposed by the projected transfer to the Levante area of the resources which, according to the Plan, were supposed to be surplus in the basin; from then on, the planning of the possible uses began, which, interrupted by the Spanish Civil War of 1936, began to be developed from 1940 onwards.

=== Tagus-Segura Diversion ===
Tagus-Segura water transfer.

The first time that the Tagus basin was considered as part of a solution to the problem of scarcity of water resources in the southeast was in Spain in the 1930s. From 1960 onwards, studies of water resources were systematically carried out and the potential for irrigation and supply were evaluated.

The transfer infrastructures are, essentially, the following:

- Two regulating reservoirs, Entrepeñas and Buendía, with a capacity of 835 and 1639 hm³, connected by a tunnel that allows flows from the former to the latter to be evacuated.
- The Bolarque reservoir, with a capacity of 31 hm³, where the intake is located and from where the water is distributed.
- The elevation from Bolarque to the small reservoir of La Bujeda, sized to provide, in coordination with Bolarque, the hydroelectric regulation. It consists of four groups capable of lifting 66 m³ at a height of 243 m, with a maximum power of 208 MW. The plant is reversible, the normal operation consists of lifting to La Bujeda and turbining from La Bujeda to Bolarque to produce electricity, 400 MW.
- The canal that starts at La Bujeda is capable of transporting 33 m³/s and consists of two parts; from La Bujeda to the tail of the Alarcón reservoir, in the Júcar basin, and another from the outlet of the latter to the Talave reservoir, in the Segura basin, with respective lengths of 93 and 135 km for each section; Along this route, there are several aqueducts, the most outstanding being the Cigüela aqueduct, which is 6190 m long and 44 m high, several tunnels, 12 in the first section with a total of 11,878 m, and the Talave tunnel in the second section, 32 km long. There are also other singular works, such as the Altomira balancing chimney, 69 m high, and several hydroelectric power production plants.

== Events ==
Table with episodes of meteorological drought that occurred in the Tagus demarcation up to the end of the 19th century.

Year	Event
Prehistory	According to Diodorus Siculus, a drought depopulated the Iberian Peninsula in prehistoric times.
224 BC	Drought in the center of the Iberian Peninsula, lasting 26 years, producing general ruin.
680	Great drought, depopulation of central Spain.
707 to 709	Great drought, famine and disease throughout Spain, with half of the population dying.
846–877	Thirty-one year drought, reaching its peak in 873, in which the springs dried up, cereal crops failed, vines and fruit trees were lost and livestock died for lack of watering places. In 800 the Mediterranean and the Adriatic seas were frozen.
899	The drought is repeated, although not as severe as the previous one.
982	General drought in all Spain, it was not possible to sow.
1172	Great cold, completely freezing the Tagus.
1243	Drought in Europe and famine so extreme that it produced great mortality and cases of cannibalism.
1257	Great drought in Castile, during the winter of 57–58.
1302	Great drought, famine and mortality in Castile.
1333	Drought, famine and mortality in Castile and Galicia.
1355	Year of the driest; no great damage.
1473	Very dry winter.
1503	Drought and famine in Castile.
1506	Drought, famine and plague throughout Spain. Year known as the year of the famine. Many springs and rivers dried up. Wheat had to be brought from Sicily and Russia.
1513	Drought and famine in Castile until the harvest. Then heavy downpours.
1539	Drought in Castile.
1630	Drought and famine in Castile.
1639–1640	Droughts in both Castilles and general droughts in Europe, lowering many rivers and drying up many springs, which ended with great cold.
1650	Drought of thirty years in Castile, until 1680, with plagues of locusts.
1703	Drought in Castile.
1723	Drought in Castile.
1724	Great drought in Castile and in June flood in Segovia.
1738	A very dry year began in Andalusia and Castile, ending so cold that several rivers froze in Castile.
1749	Drought throughout Spain.
1750	Continuation of the drought.
1752	Continuation of the drought in Castile.
1764	Drought and famine in Castile.
1767	Drought and intense cold in Castile and torrential rains at the end.
1789	Drought in Castile and Murcia.
1796	Pertinent drought in Castile, Aragon and Murcia.
1803	Very dry year.
1827	Very dry year.
1878	Very dry in Castile, Extremadura and Andalusia.

=== Large floods ===
The rivers of the Tagus demarcation have generated, prior to their regulation, floods that have often resulted in major floods, causing great damage, causing personal and material losses. The areas with the greatest number of floods were: the areas of the Tagus river in Talavera de la Reina and Aranjuez, the Jarama river in San Fernando de Henares, the Tiétar river and the Alagón river.

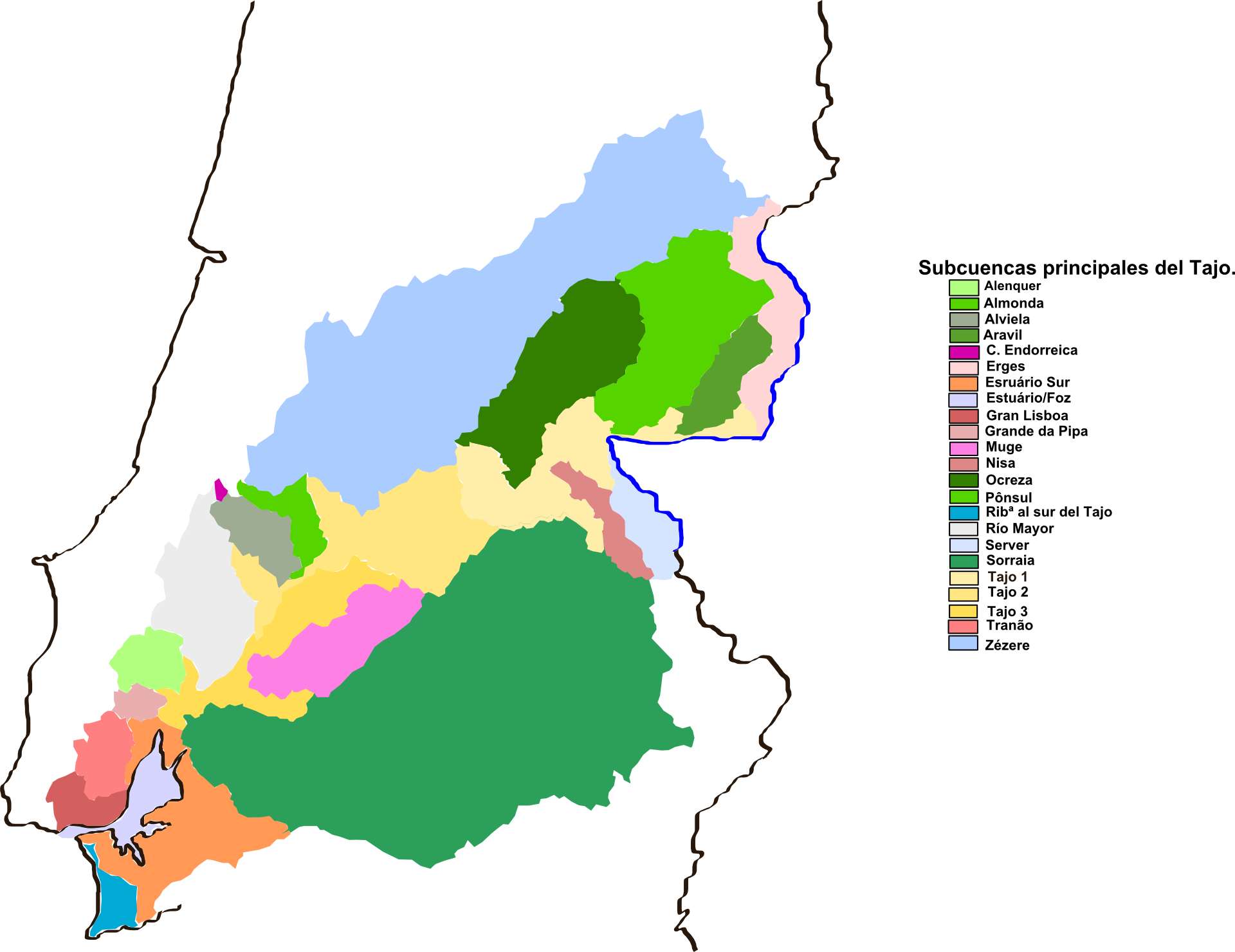
Sub-basins of the Tagus river in Portugal.

== Portuguese Tagus ==
The surface area of the Portuguese part of the basin accounts for more than 28% of the continental part of Portugal, including entirely the districts of Santarém and Castelo Branco and a significant part of those of Lisbon, Leiria, Portalegre, Guarda, Évora and Setúbal. It includes all or part of 94 "Concelhos", with an area of more than 30,000 km^{2}, where about 3.5 million inhabitants live (more than one third of the country's population). It is made up of 16 hydrographic sub-basins corresponding to the main tributaries of the Tagus River, a small endorheic basin and the small basins that drain into the Paja Sea and the Atlantic Ocean, between the Costa da Caparica and Cabo Espichel.

=== Alenquer sub-basin ===
Small sub-basin on the right bank of the Tagus, with 282 km^{2}, partially comprising the municipalities of Alenquer, Azambuja and Cadaval. Composed of two distinct lithological groups, to the west calcareous rocks, fractured and karsified landscapes, with essentially subway runoff and the other group represented by recent rocks, Cenozoic, sandy, very permeable in its great majority.

The flora species, endemic, rare or vulnerable, linked to the edaphic-hygrophilous environments: Glinus lotoides, Euphorbia uliginosa, Myosotis lusitanica and Juncus valvatus. The valleys have inaccessible margins covered with well-preserved shrub and tree vegetation. The presence of Iberian emerald lizards in some of the riverbanks associated with agricultural valleys, with their fragmented distribution and the degradation of the riverbanks, are two aspects to consider for the conservation of the species.

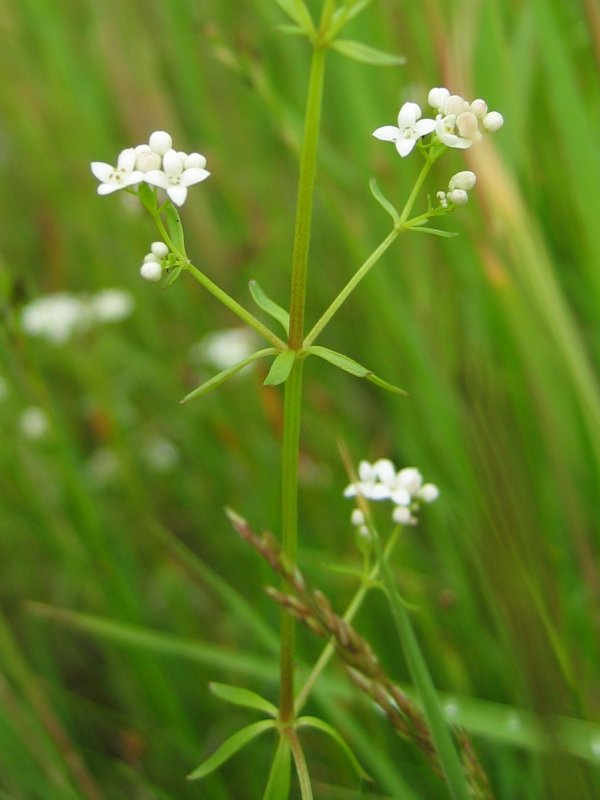
Galium palustre.

=== Almonda sub-basin ===
Small sub-basin on the right bank of the Tagus, 274 km^{2}, including the municipalities of Alcanena, Entroncamento, Golega, Porto de Mós, Santarém and Torres Novas. It consists of fractured calcareous rocks, with eminently subway runoff, contributing as a recharge structure for the free, semi-confined and confined aquifers in the area.

Within the zone there are several areas of special protection:

- Serras de Aire e Candeeiros Natural Park.
- Boquilobo Bog Natural Reserve.
- Paul do Boquilobo Special Protection Zone.

The most important area of the sub-basin is Paul do Boquilobo, whose flora has been very degraded in recent years, and some of the species identified there 20 years ago have not been observed recently. The species that settle there are Oenanthe fistulosa, Butomus umbellatus, Damasonium alisma and Galium palustre.

=== Alviela sub-basin ===
Sub-basin of 331 km^{2}, on the right bank of the Tagus, in the municipalities of Idanha-a-Nova and Castelo Branco. Sub-basin with sedimentary cover, with a granitic outcrop located on its eastern edge.

The flora species present are Salix salvifolia subsp. australis and the importance of the rocky escarpments for rupicolous birds, especially for nocturnal and diurnal birds of prey and the black stork.

In these areas mammals can be found that use the watercourses and their margins as a means of movement between territories (European wildcat, Iberian wolf, Iberian lynx, otter, etc.).

=== Erges sub-basin ===
The sub-basin of the Erges river, which forms a border with Spain in a large part of its course, with an area of 593 km^{2} in the municipalities of Idanha-a-Nova and Penamacor. Lithologically dominated by impermeable rocks, quartzite ridges and a recent sedimentary cover (Cenozoic), which can acquire characteristics of a free aquifer.

In this sub-basin, the rocky escarpments play an important role, where a large number of rupicolous birds nest, and it is included in the Special Protection Zone of the International Tagus.

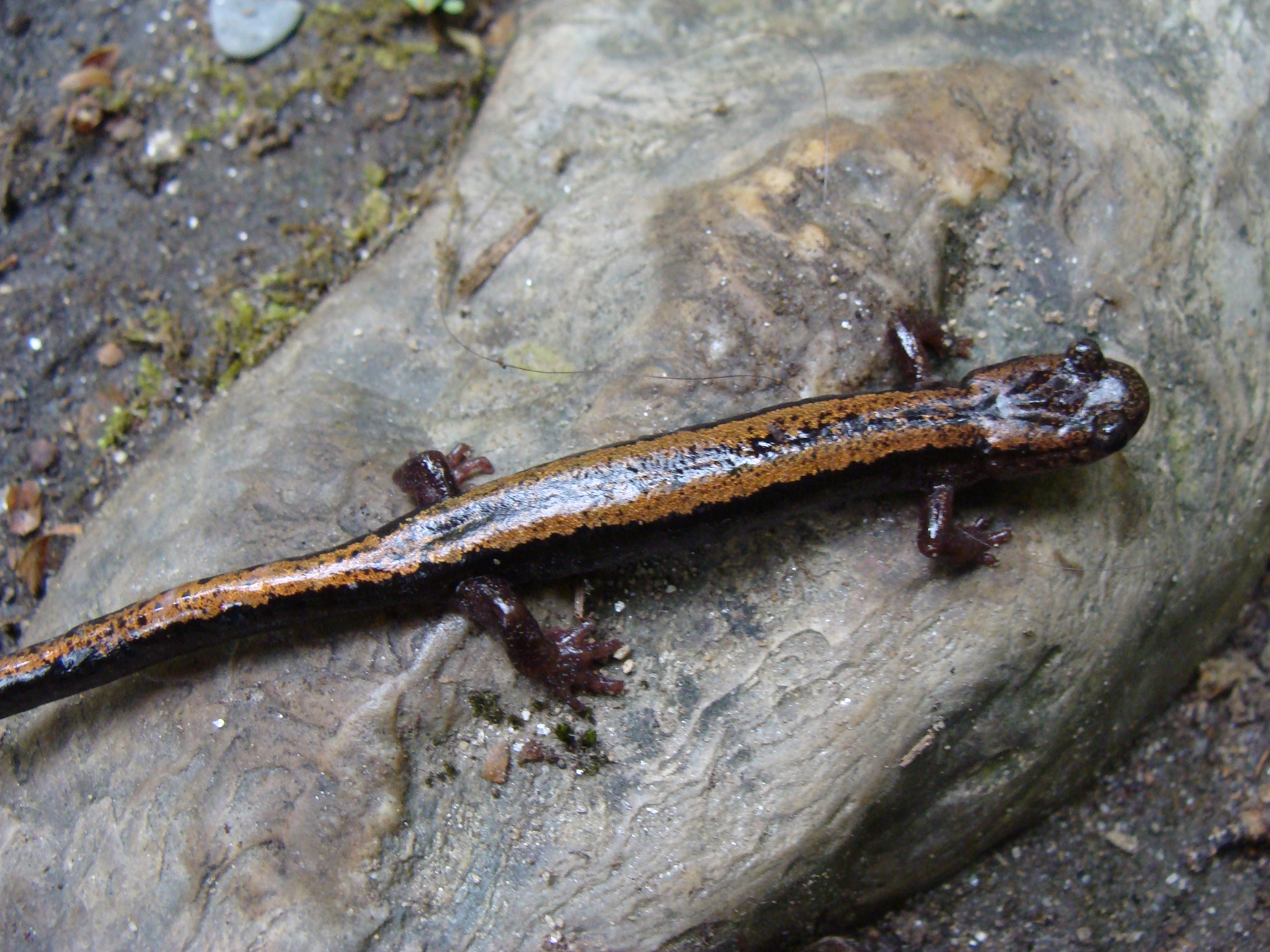
Chioglossa lusitanica.

=== Zézere sub-basin ===
The Zézere river basin is one of the largest sub-basins of the Tagus river in Portugal, with 5076 km^{2} (about 20% of the total). It includes the municipalities of Alvaiázere, Belmonte, Castanheira de Pera, Ferreira do Zêzere, Sertã and Vila de Rei and part of twenty-four others. It extends over an extensive area of the northernmost part of the basin, dominated by granitic outcrops in the southern part of this sub-basin, originating narrow valleys.

The flora, endemic or vulnerable linked to hygrophilous environments are: Osmunda regalis, Montia fontana subsp. amporitana, Glinus lotoides, Gratiola linifolia, Ludwigia palustris. This area is rich and varied from the point of view of habitat that enhances the quality of the fauna it shelters, so in the upper courses of the Zézere and its tributaries, the species of Chioglossa lusitanica and Galemys pyrenaicus stand out. In the middle part of the fluvial course, they stand out for the nesting of rupicolous birds such as the Eurasian eagle-owl.
