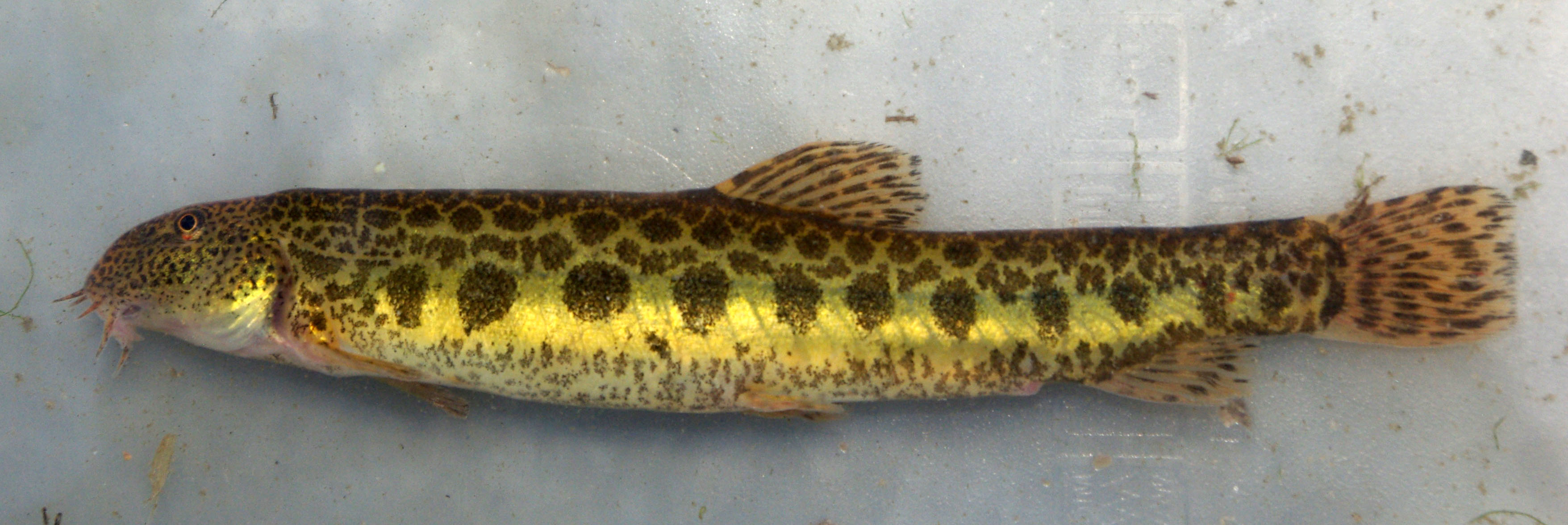

Conservation status
- Vulnerable (IUCN 3.1)

Scientific classification
- Kingdom: Animalia
- Phylum: Chordata
- Class: Actinopterygii
- Order: Cypriniformes
- Family: Cobitidae
- Genus: Cobitis
- Species: C. vettonica

Binomial name
- Cobitis vettonica Doadrio & Perdices, 1997
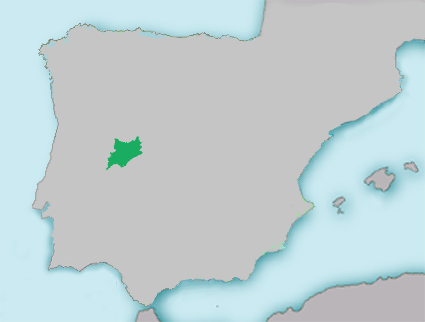

= Cobitis vettonica =

Species of fish

Cobitis vettonica is a species of ray-finned fish in the family Cobitidae. It is found only in Spain. Its natural habitats are rivers and intermittent rivers. It is threatened by habitat loss.
