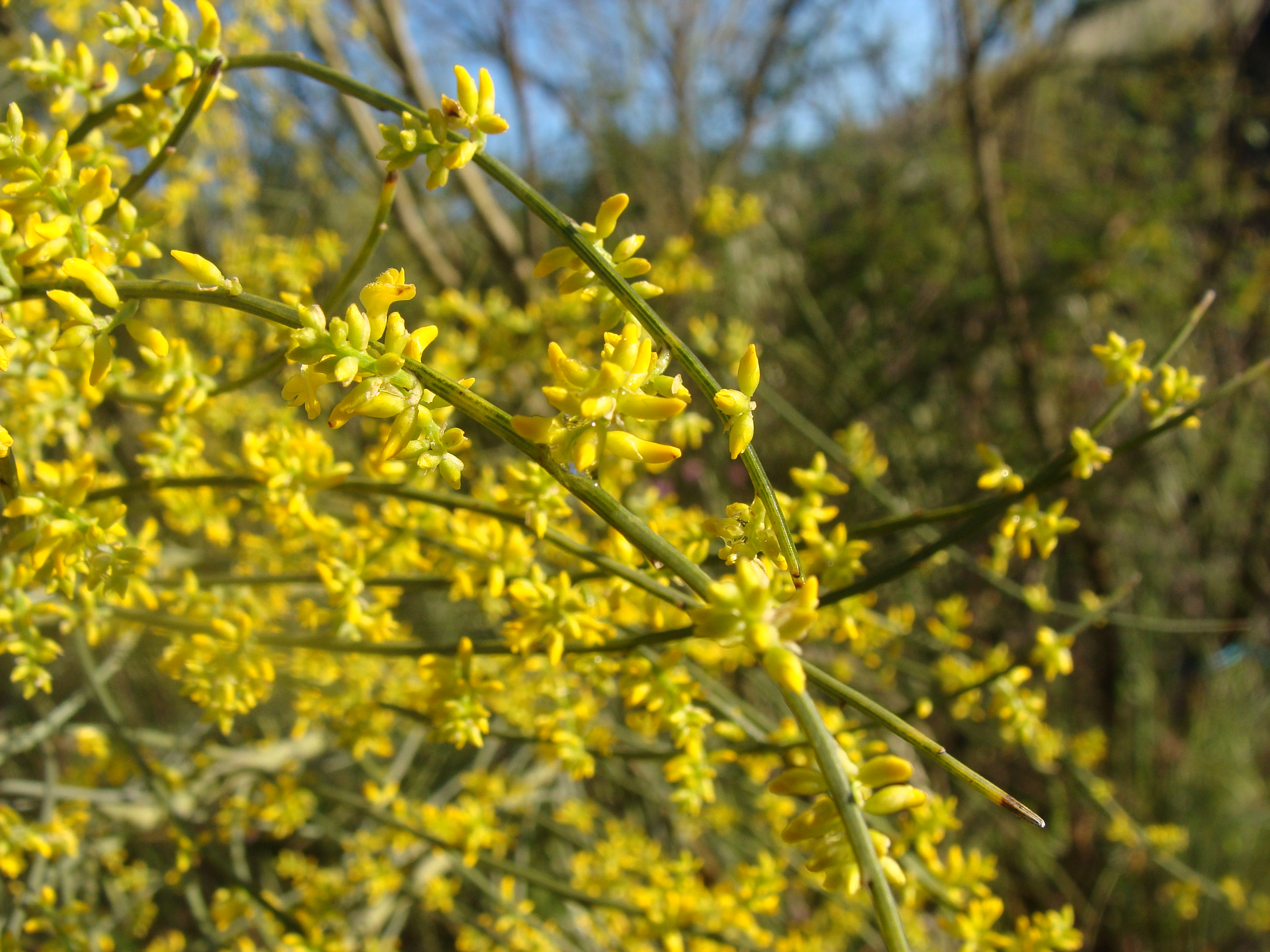

Scientific classification
- Kingdom: Plantae
- Clade: Tracheophytes
- Clade: Angiosperms
- Clade: Eudicots
- Clade: Rosids
- Order: Fabales
- Family: Fabaceae
- Subfamily: Faboideae
- Genus: Retama
- Species: R. sphaerocarpa

Binomial name
- Retama sphaerocarpa (L.) Boiss.

Synonyms
- Spartium sphaerocarpum L.; Genista sphaerocarpa (L.) Lam.; Spartium grandiflorum Salisb.; Retama lutea Raf.; Boelia sphaerocarpa (L.) Webb; Boelia sphaerocarpa var. mesogaea Webb; Retama atlantica Pomel; Retama sphaerocarpa var. mesogaea (Webb) Willk.; Retama sphaerocarpa f. atlantica (Pomel) Batt.; Retama sphaerocarpa var. atlantica (Pomel) Maire; Lygos sphaerocarpa (L.) Heywood

= Retama sphaerocarpa =

Species of flowering plant

Retama sphaerocarpa is a flowering bush species in the genus Retama, native to the Iberian Peninsula (Portugal and Spain) and North Africa (Morocco, Algeria, Tunisia).
