= Poyatos =

Poyatos, Spain
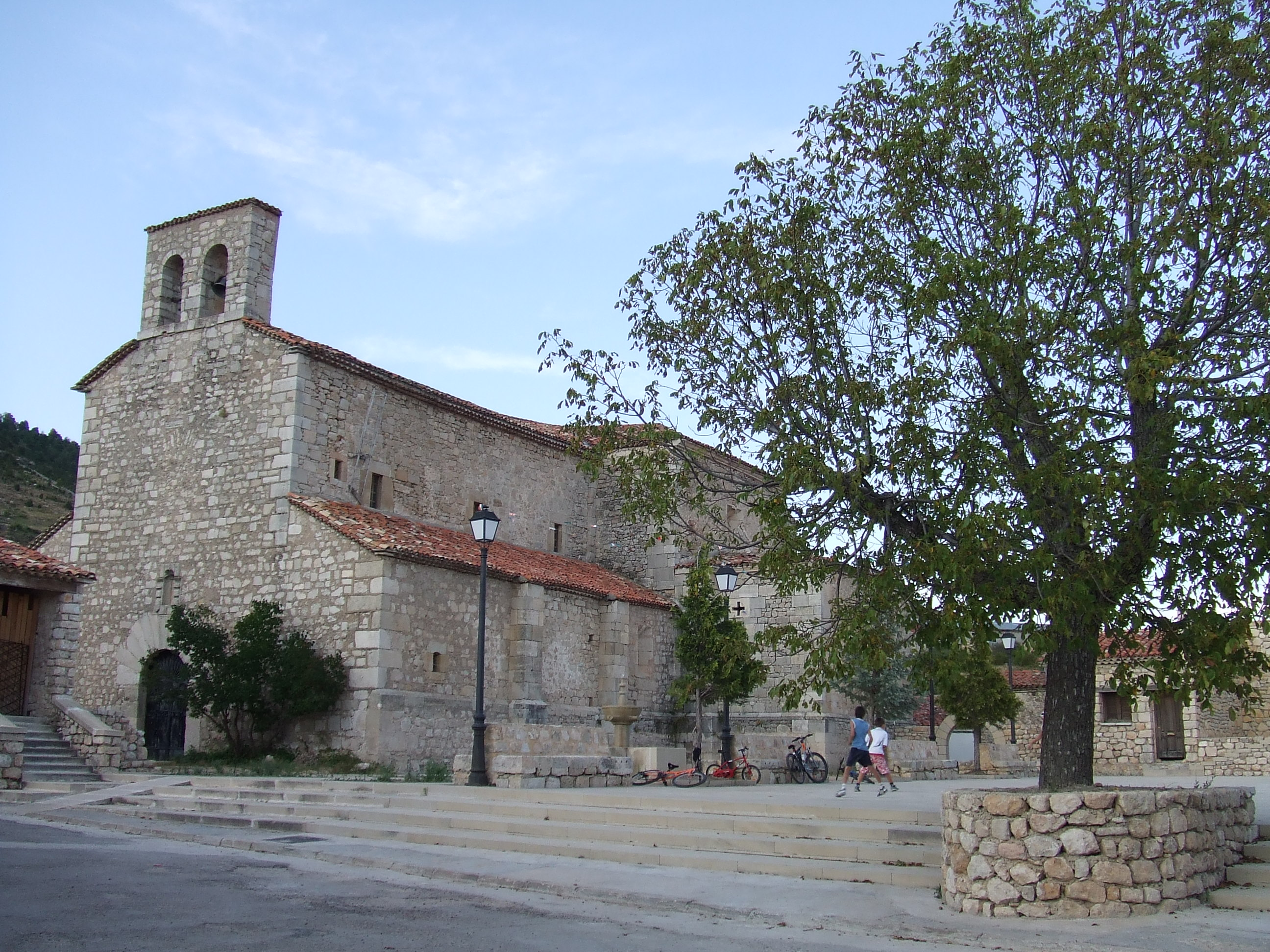
- Church of Poyatos

- Coat of arms

- Location within Spain Location within Castilla-La Mancha
- Coordinates: 40°26′N 2°04′W
- Country: Spain
- Autonomous community: Castile-La Mancha
- Province: Cuenca
- Municipality: Poyatos

Area
  - Total: 44.12 km^{2} (17.03 sq mi)
- Elevation: 1,239 m (4,065 ft)

Population (2025-01-01)
  - Total: 70
  - Density: 1.6/km^{2} (4.1/sq mi)
- Time zone: UTC+1 (CET)
  - Summer (DST): UTC+2 (CEST)

Poyatos is a municipality located in the province of Cuenca, Castile-La Mancha, Spain. According to the 2010 census (INE), the municipality had a population of 93 inhabitants.
