= NASE (disambiguation) =

NASE may refer to:

== Organisations ==
- National Academy of Scuba Educators, or NASE Worldwide
- Network for Astronomy School Education – NASE

== Biology ==
- Neretvan nase, Chondrostoma knerii
- Minnow-nase, Chondrostoma phoxinus
- Common nase, Chondrostoma nasus
- Iberian nase Pseudochondrostoma polylepis
- South-west European nase, Parachondrostoma toxostoma
- Kuban nase, Chondrostoma kubanicum
- Terek nase, Chondrostoma oxyrhynchum
- Colchic nase, Chondrostoma colchicum
- Kura nase, Chondrostoma cyri
- South European nase, Protochondrostoma genei

== Music ==
- Balkansko a naše, a 2008 album by Edo Maajka
- Sanjala sam naše venčanje, a 1984 album by Dragana Mirković
- Naše Věc, Czech hip hop band

== See also ==
- NASA (disambiguation)
- NESA (disambiguation)
