= Parachondrostoma turiense =

Conservation status
- Vulnerable (IUCN 3.1)

Scientific classification
- Kingdom: Animalia
- Phylum: Chordata
- Class: Actinopterygii
- Order: Cypriniformes
- Family: Leuciscidae
- Subfamily: Leuciscinae
- Genus: Parachondrostoma
- Species: P. turiense

Binomial name
- Parachondrostoma turiense (Elvira, 1987)
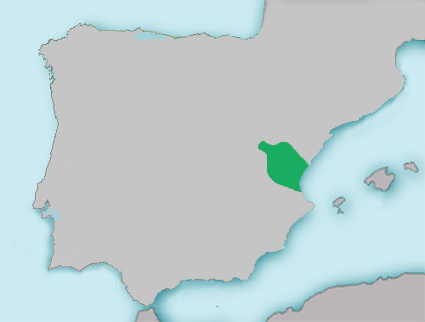

Synonyms
- Chondrostoma toxostoma turiense Elvira, 1987; Chondrostoma turiense Elvira, 1987

Species of fish

Parachondrostoma turiense, the Turia nase, is a species of freshwater ray-finned fish belonging to the family Leuciscidae, which includes the daces. Eurasian minnows and related fishes. This species is endemic to Spain.

== Taxonomy ==
Parachondrostoma turiense was first formally described as Chondrostoma toxostoma turiense in 1987 by the Spanish zoologist Benigno Elvira with its type locality given as the Turia River, Chulilla in the Valencian Community of Spain. It was described as a subspecies of the French nase (P. toxostoma) but it is now classified as a valid species in the genus Parachondrostoma within the subfamily Leuciscinae of the family Leuciscidae. The genus was proposed in 2007 for four species which were split from Chondrostoma on the basis of genetic evidence.

== Etymology ==
Parachondrostoma turiense belongs to the genus Parachondrostoma, this name places the prefix para-, meaning "near to" or "similar to" in front of the genus name Chondrostoma, which is a combination of chondros, a word meaning "gristle" or "cartilage", with stoma, meaning "mouth". This is an allusion to the horny plates in the mouths of the fishes, in Chondrostoma . The specific name, turiense, refers to the type locality, the Turia River.

== Description ==
Parachondrostoma turiense has between 44 and 51 scales in its lateral line, 7 or 8 dorsal fin rays and 7 to 11 anal fin rays. The mouth is arched with a thin horny later on the lower lip, The dorsal and anal fins have concave margins. It has a maximum standard length of 25 cm (9.8 in).

== Distribution and habitat ==
Parachondrostoma turiense is endemic to eastern Spain where it is restricted to the drainage basins of the Turia, Palancia (Rio Palancia) and Mijares rivers in the Valencian Community and Aragon. This species is typically found in small, shallow stretches, less than 20 m (66 ft) wide and 1 m (3 ft 3 in) deep, where there is riparian vegetation. Within these stretches these fishes prefer relatively deep pools where there is with a slow current and ample cover in the form of vegetation or fallen timber. The habitats preferred by the Turia nase have wide variations in water levels and may dry up in some sections. However, some fishes use isolated permanent shady pools as refuges.

== Conservation ==
Parachondrostoma turiense is classified as Vulnerable by the International Union for Conservation of Nature, previously it was classified as Endangered. The threats to this species are anthropogenic degradation of its habitat due to pollution, agriculture, hydroelectric impoundments and the resultant changes to water levels. It may alo be threatened by climate change increasing the risks of the rivers it ing=habits being dewatered more frequently and for longer periods. It is also threatened by invasive non native fish which have been introduced into the rivers it occurs in.

The Turia nase is legally protected in the Valencian Community and under Appendix III of the Bern Convention and Annex II of the European Union Habitats Directive. In the 2010s Turia nase were captive bred and released into the Turia river but it is not known if these efforts are continuing or if the outcome of these releases was monitored.
