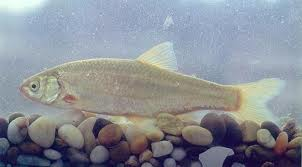
- Iberian nase (Pseudochondrostoma polylepis)

Scientific classification
- Kingdom: Animalia
- Phylum: Chordata
- Class: Actinopterygii
- Order: Cypriniformes
- Family: Leuciscidae
- Subfamily: Leuciscinae
- Genus: Pseudochondrostoma; Robalo, V. C. Almada, Levy & Doadrio, 2007

Type species
- Chondrostoma polylepis Steindachner, 1864

= Pseudochondrostoma =

Genus of fishes

Pseudochondrostoma is a genus of freshwater ray-finned fish belonging to the family Leuciscidae, which includes the daces, Eurasian minnows and related species. The fishes in this genus occur in the Iberian Peninsula. They are commonly known as the straight-mouth nases.

== Taxonomy ==
Pseudochondrostoma was first proposed as a genus in 2007 by Joana Isabel Robalo, Vítor Carvalho Almada, André Levy Coelho and Ignacio Doadrio with Chondrostoma polylepis designated as the type species. C. polylepis was first formally described in 1864 by the Austrian ichthyologist Franz Steindachner with its type locality given as Crato, Portugal. Robalo et al proposed the genus Pseudochondrostoma when they reviewed the genus Chondrostoma and found that in the north and central Mediterranean the taxa previously included in Chondrostoma should be placed in new genera. The authors proposed that these taxa be transferred into the genera Achondrostoma, Iberochondrostoma, Pseudochondrostoma, Protochondrostoma and Parachondrostoma. The genus Pseudochondrostoma is classified within the subfamily Leuciscinae of the family Leuciscidae.

== Species ==
Pseudochondrostoma contains the following species:

- Pseudochondrostoma duriense (M. M. Coelho, 1985) (Northern straight-mouth nase)
- Pseudochondrostoma polylepis (Steindachner, 1864) (Iberian nase)
- Pseudochondrostoma willkommii (Steindachner, 1866) (Southern straight-mouth nase)

== Etymology ==
Pseudchondrostoma prefixes Chondrostoma with pseudo- which means "false", applied because although the fishes in this genus are similar in appearance to the nases in the genus Chondrostoma such similarities are due to convergent evolution rather than common ancestry, and are therefore "false".

== Characteristics ==
Pseudchondrostoma nases have a straight, rather than arched mouth, which has a horny layer in the lower lip. They have between 59 and 78 pored scales in the lateral line, there are between 10 and 12 scales above the lateral line with 4 to 6 scales below it. The anal fin has between 8 and 10 branched rays with 8 or 9 branched rays in the dorsal fin. These fishes all have maximum standard length of 40 cm (16 in).

== Distribution ==
Pseudchondrostoma nases are endemic to the rivers on the Atlantic coastal slope if the Iberian Peninsula.
