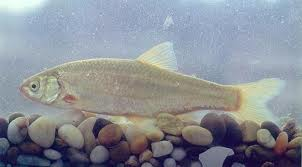

Conservation status
- Vulnerable (IUCN 3.1)

Scientific classification
- Kingdom: Animalia
- Phylum: Chordata
- Class: Actinopterygii
- Order: Cypriniformes
- Family: Leuciscidae
- Subfamily: Leuciscinae
- Genus: Pseudochondrostoma
- Species: P. polylepis

Binomial name
- Pseudochondrostoma polylepis (Steindachner, 1864)
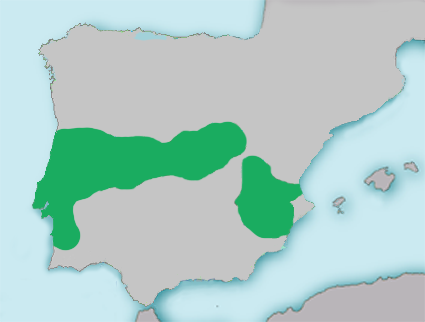
- Range of Iberian nase

Synonyms
- Chondrostoma polylepis Steindachner, 1864

= Iberian nase =

Species of fish

The Iberian nase (Pseudochondrostoma polylepis) is a species of freshwater ray-finned fish belonging to the family Leuciscidae, which includes the daces, Eurasian minnows and related species. This species is endemic to the Iberian Peninsula in Spain and Portugal.

== Taxonomy ==
The Iberian nase was first formally described in 1864 as Chondrostoma polylepis by the Austrian ichthyologist Franz Steindachner, with its type locality given as Crato, Portugal. It was designated as the type species of the genus Pseudochondrostoma within the subfamily Leuciscinae of the family Leuciscidae. This genus was proposed in 2007 for three species which were split from Chondrostoma on the basis of genetic evidence.

== Etymology ==
The Iberian nase is the type species of the genus Pseudochondrostoma, a name which prefixes Chondrostoma with pseudo- which means "false", applied because although the fishes in this genus are similar in appearance to the nases in the genus Chondrostoma, such similarities are due to convergent evolution rather than common ancestry, and are therefore "false". The specific name, polylepis, means "many scales", a reference to the number of scales along the lateral line compared to Chondrostoma nasus, a species which had been confused with this one.

== Description ==
The Iberian nase is told apart from other members of the genus Pseudochondrostoma by the edge of the lower jaw being straight, the lateral line having between 61 and 75 scales along its length, and the anal fin having 9 1/2 branched fin rays. This species has a maximum standard length of 40 cm (16 in).

== Distribution and habitat ==
The Iberian nase is endemic to the Iberian Peninsula, where it is found in the central part of the Peninsula in rivers draining into the Atlantic from the Tagus, south to the Sado River in Spain and Portugal. It has also been introduced to the Segura and Júcar river systems in Eastern Spain, and the Arade River in the Algarve, Portugal. This species is found in perennial lowland river channels and larger tributaries. It has colonised some reservoirs where they can reach suitable spawning habitat upstream.

== Biology ==
The Iberian nase has a diet dominated by periphyton, with some detritus and benthic invertebrates. The periphyton is scraped from the surface of submerged surfaces with its specialised mouthparts. The spawning season runs from April to July, depending on location and environmental conditions such as water temperature. At this time the mature adults migrate upstream to beds of gravel or other coarse substrates in shallow, fast-flowing water. The breeding males develop many small nuptial tubercles on the head and body. The juveniles and a few subadults are reported to remain in upstream habitats all year, preferring riffles and runs with submerged cover. Many rivers and streams in northwestern Iberia are characterised by very variable seasonal discharges, and the upper reaches may have their water levels lowered significantly or they may completely dry in the summer. Some subadult fishes thus endure such periods of drought by taking refuge in deeper relict pools.

== Conservation ==
The Iberian nase is classified as Near-threatened by the International Union for Conservation of Nature. The threats to this species include habitat modification, pollution, climate change and invasive species. It has also colonised some rivers in eastern Spain by exploiting canals which have linked its native drainages to the Segura and Júcar drainages. The arrival of the Iberian nase in these systems may have contributed to the decline of the Júcar nase (Parachondrostoma arrigonis) by hybridisation and competition. This species also hybridises with other Iberian nase species.
