= Iberochondrostoma lemmingii =

Conservation status
- Near Threatened (IUCN 3.1)

Scientific classification
- Kingdom: Animalia
- Phylum: Chordata
- Class: Actinopterygii
- Order: Cypriniformes
- Family: Leuciscidae
- Subfamily: Leuciscinae
- Genus: Iberochondrostoma
- Species: I. lemmingii

Binomial name
- Iberochondrostoma lemmingii (Steindachner, 1866)
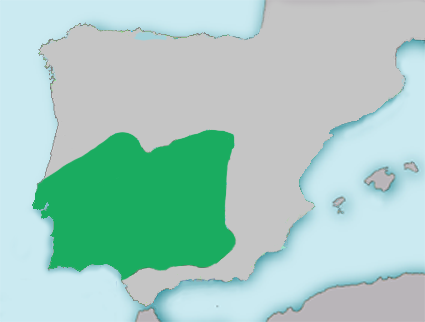

Synonyms
- Leuciscus lemmingi Steindachner, 1866; Rutilus lemmingii (Steindachner 1866); Chondrostoma lemmingii (Steindachner 1866)

Species of fish

Iberochondrostoma lemmingii, the Iberian arch-mouthed nase (Portuguese: ruivaca; Spanish: pardilla), is a species of ray-finned fish in the family Leuciscidae. It is found in Portugal and Spain. It lives in the middle and lower reaches of rivers with slow current.

Until recently, I. lemmingii was placed in the genus Chondrostoma. Fish that now are recognized as Achondrostoma salmantinum were earlier included in I. lemmingii.

The maximum length of I. lemmingii 25 cm (9.8 in) TL.
