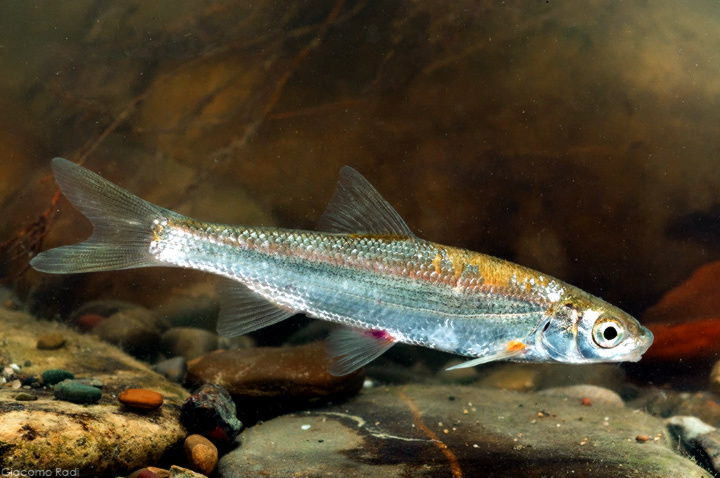

Conservation status
- Vulnerable (IUCN 3.1)

Scientific classification
- Kingdom: Animalia
- Phylum: Chordata
- Class: Actinopterygii
- Order: Cypriniformes
- Family: Leuciscidae
- Subfamily: Leuciscinae
- Genus: Protochondrostoma; Robalo, V. C. Almada, Levy & Doadrio, 2007
- Species: P. genei

Binomial name
- Protochondrostoma genei (Bonaparte, 1839)
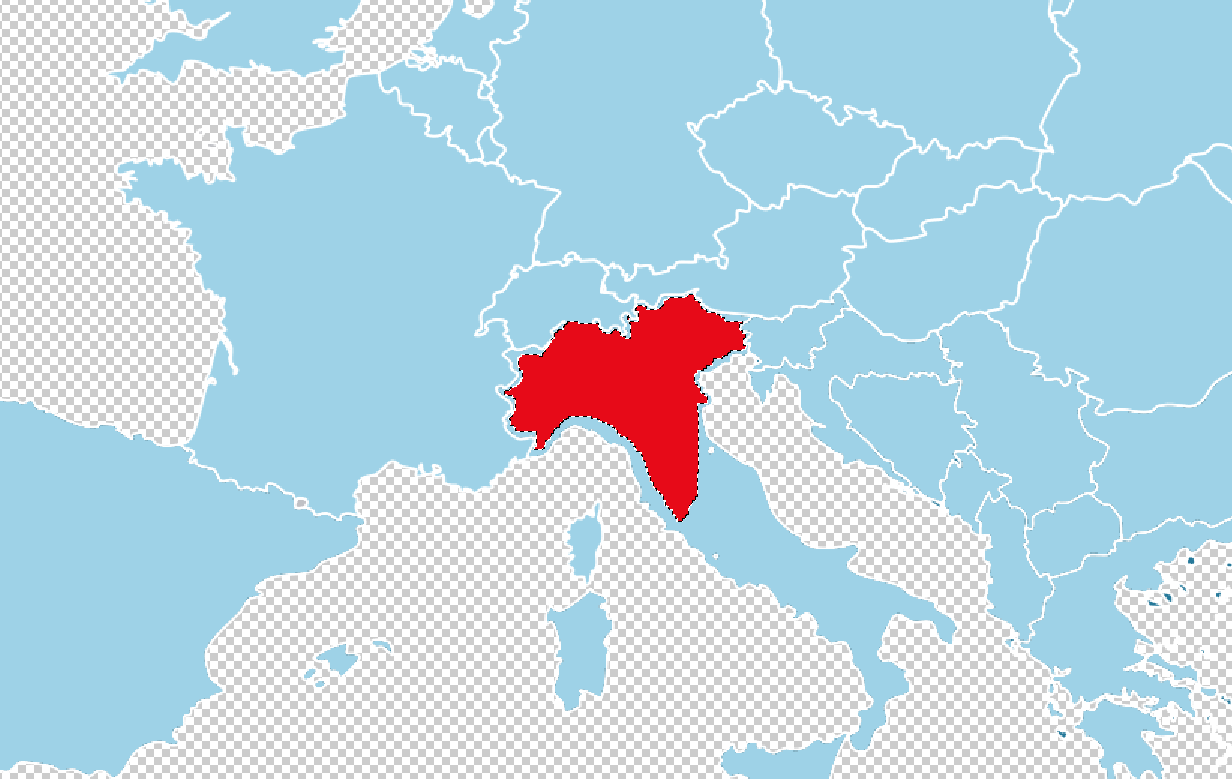

Synonyms
- Leuciscus genei Bonaparte, 1839; Chondrostoma genei (Bonaparte, 1839); Chondrostoma jaculum De Filippi, 1844; Chondrostoma genei var. albicans Gatti, 1896

= South European nase =

Species of fish

The South European nase (Protochondrostoma genei) is a species of freshwater ray-finned fish belonging to the family Leuciscidae, which includes the daces, Eurasian minnows and related species. It is the only species in the monospecific genus Protochondrostoma. This species is found in Italy and Slovenia.

== Taxonomy ==
The South European nase was first formally described as Leuciscis genei in 1839 by the French biologist and art collector Charles Lucien Bonaparte with its type locality given as "Piedmont Lakes" in Italy. It is now classified as the only species in the genus Protochondrostoma within the subfamily Leuciscinae of the family Leuciscidae. The genus was proposed in 2007 when a number of southern European species were split from Chondrostoma on the basis of genetic evidence and reclassified into the genera Achondrostoma, Iberochondrostoma, Pseudochondrostoma, Protochondrostoma and Parachondrostoma. With this taxon being the most basal of the genera split from Chondrostoma.

== Etymology ==
The South European nase is the only species in the genus Protochondrostoma, this name prefixes Chondrostoma with proto- which means "first", this reflects the basal position of this genus compared to the other genera which were slit from Chondrostoma. The specific name, genei, honours the Italian zoologist Giuseppe Géné, who was director of the Royal Zoological Museum at Turin.

== Description ==
The South European nase is distinguished from the Italian Chondrostoma by having a wide dark midlateral strip extending from the eye to the base of the tail. It has a arched mouth with a thin lower lip which has a well-developed horny sheath. There are between 50 and 62 scales along the lateral line and 8 1/2 branched fin rays in the dorsal fin. The body is slender. There are red bases to all the fins other than the dorsal fin. This species has a maximum total length of 30 cm (12 in), although 15 cm (5.9 in) is more typical.

== Distribution and habitat ==
The South European nase is indigenous to the river systems draining into the northern Adriatic Sea, from the Vomano in eastern Italy to the Soča in western Slovenia. It has been introduced to rivers further south in Italy into rivers draining into the Tyrrhenian Sea and Ligurian Sea. This species prefers rivers below 400 m (1,300 ft) above sea level, especially where the habitat is complex with variable substrates, current speeds, undercut banks, submerged wood, rocks and aquatic vegetation.

== Biology ==
The South European nase is found in groups. It is an omnivore, its diet dominated by algae growing on rocks and stones as well as aquatic insects. It migrates, in groups, to spawn in the main tributaries, spawning over gravel where there is a fast flow. Spawning has been reported to take place in March to June. They are sexually mature at 3 or 4 years old. The breeding males change colour and develop nuptial tubercles. They are fractional spawners and each female may lay between 2,000 and 5,000 eggs per year.

== Conservation ==
The South European nase is classified as Vulnerable by the International Union for Conservation of Nature. The decline in the population has been attributed to a combination of modification of the rivers it lives in, pollution and invasive species.
