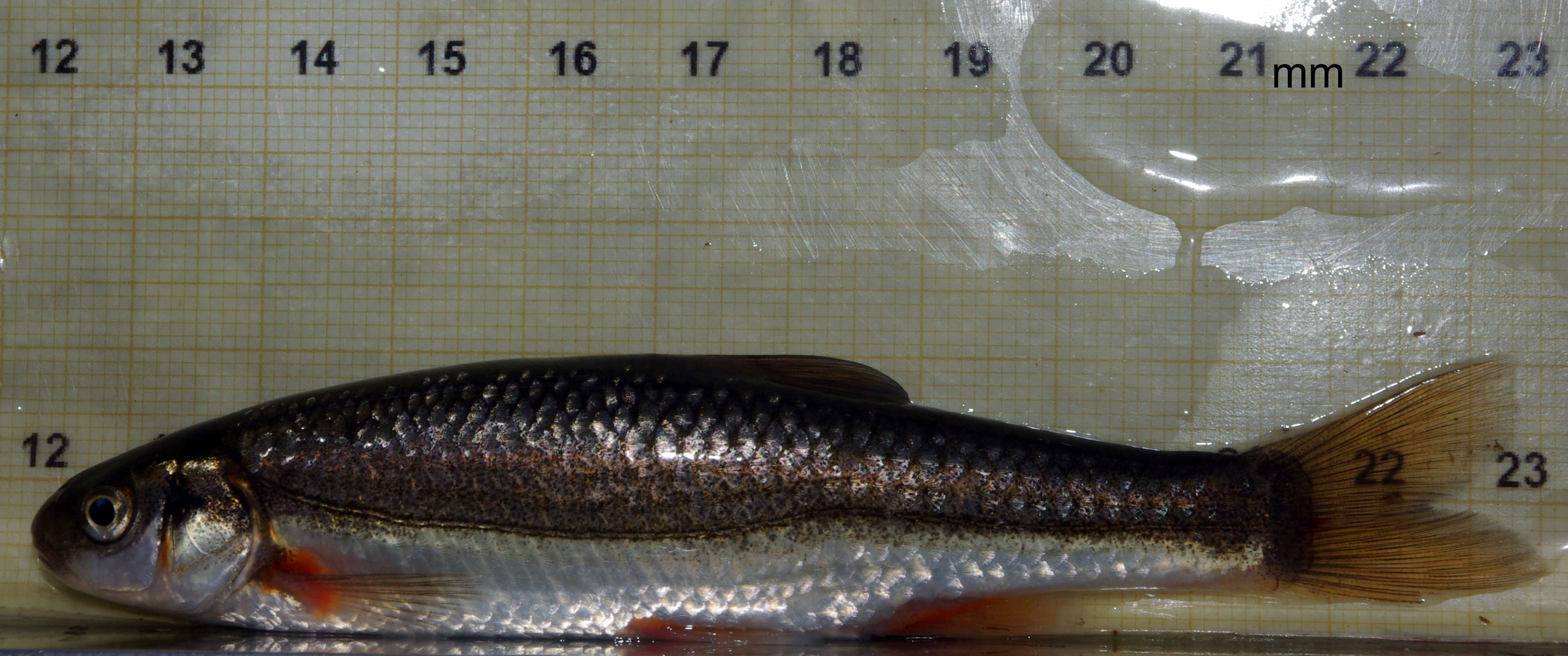

Conservation status
- Near Threatened (IUCN 3.1)

Scientific classification
- Kingdom: Animalia
- Phylum: Chordata
- Class: Actinopterygii
- Order: Cypriniformes
- Family: Leuciscidae
- Subfamily: Leuciscinae
- Genus: Achondrostoma
- Species: A. arcasii

Binomial name
- Achondrostoma arcasii (Steindachner, 1866)
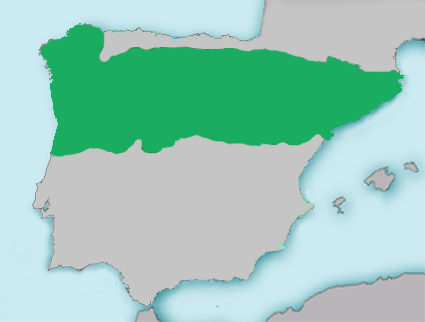
- Distribution of Achondrostoma arcasii sensu lato

Synonyms
- Leucos arcasii Steindachner, 1866; Chondrostoma arcasii (Steindachner, 1866); Rutilus arcasii (Steindachner, 1866)

= Achondrostoma arcasii =

Species of fish

Achondrostoma arcasii, termed the bermejuela, is a species of freshwater ray-finned fish belonging to the family Leuciscidae, which includes the daces. Eurasian minnows and related fishes. This species is endemic to the northern Iberian Peninsula.

== Taxonomy ==
Achondrostoma arcasii was first formally described as Leucos arcasii in 1866 by the Austrian ichthyologist Franz Steindachner with its type locality given as the Ebro River at Logroño in La Rioja and the Queiles River at Tudela in Navarre, both in Spain. It is now classified as a valid species in the genus Achondrostoma within the subfamily Leuciscinae of the family Leuciscidae. The genus was proposed in 2007 for three species which were split from Chondrostoma on the basis of genetic evidence with this species designated as the type species. Further genetic studies revealed that the taxon originally regarded as A. arcasiwas polyphyletic and that the fishes in the west of Spain were three different species A. garzonorum, A. asturicense and A. numantinum.

== Etymology ==
Achondrostoma arcasii belongs to the genus Achondrostoma, this name places the prefix a-, meaning "without", in front of the genus name Chondrostoma, which is a combination of chondros, a word meaning "gristle" or "cartilage", with stoma, meaning "mouth". This is an allusion to the lack of the horny plates in the mouths of these fishes, which are present in Chondrostoma . The specific name, arcasii, honours Laureano Pérez Arcas, a Spanish zoologist who shared specimens with Steindachner.

== Description ==
Achondrostoma arcasii differs from other species in its genus by having between 40 and 45 scales in its lateral line; 4 or 5 scale rows are found between the lateral line and the origin of the pelvic fin; the caudal peduncle has 14 rows of scales around it; the diameter of the eye diameter is equal to or greater than the length of the snout, which is rounded and obtuse; and the ventral profile of head has no marked angle at the articulation of the lower jaw. The bermejuela has a maximum total length of 25 cm (9.8 in), although 15 cm (5.9 in) is more typical.

== Distribution and habiatat ==
Achondrostoma arcasii is endemic to northeatsern Spain where it is found in rivers draining into the Mediterranean sea from the Francolí to the Túria, including the Ebro. The bermejuela is found in lakes and mountain streams, including the middle reaches of rivers. It can also occur in reservoirs in upland areas. The juveniles can be found in shallow stretches where there is a slow current and move to deeper and swifter stretches in late July.

== Biology ==
Achondrostoma arcasii mainly preys on aquatic invertebrates, although it is an opportunistic feeder and will eat detritus and plant matter. This species spawns in May and June.

== Conservation ==
Achondrostoma arcasii is classified as Near Threatened by the International Union for Conservation of Nature and is threatened by habitat degradation by pollution and the introduction of invasive species.
