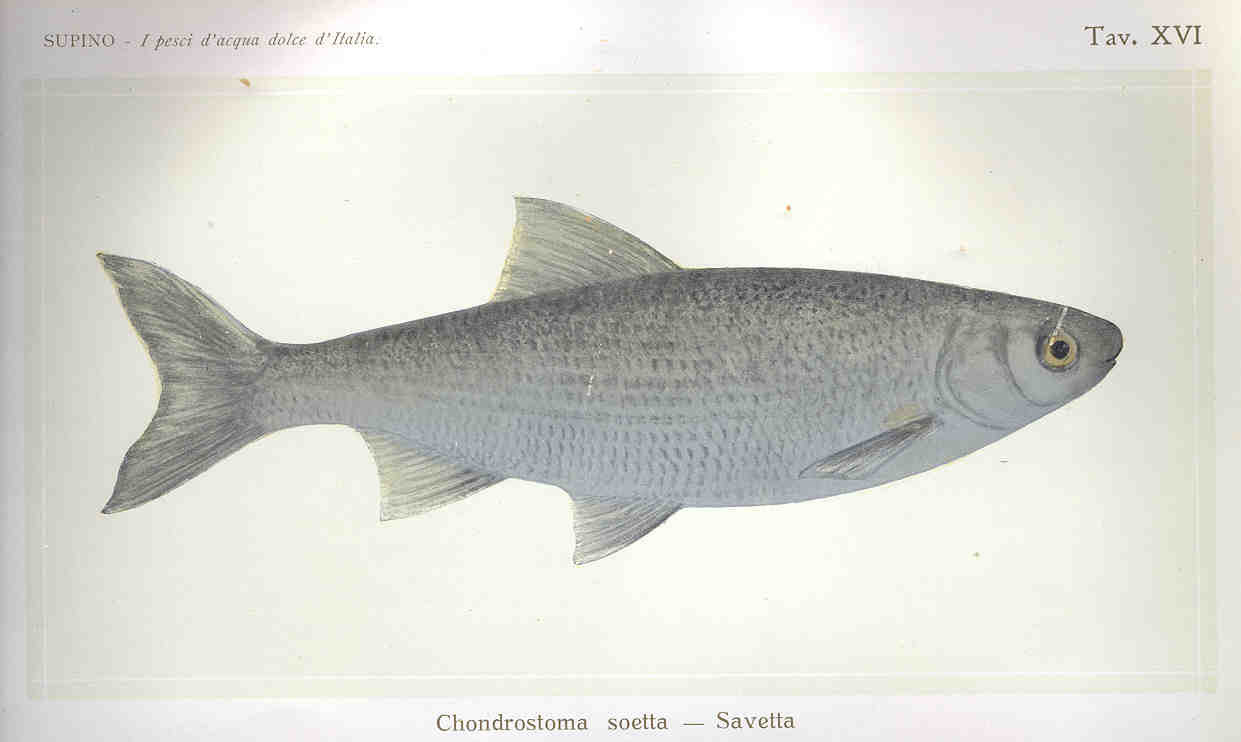

Conservation status
- Critically Endangered (IUCN 3.1)

Scientific classification
- Kingdom: Animalia
- Phylum: Chordata
- Class: Actinopterygii
- Division: Teleostei
- Order: Cypriniformes
- Family: Leuciscidae
- Subfamily: Leuciscinae
- Genus: Chondrostoma
- Species: C. soetta

Binomial name
- Chondrostoma soetta Bonaparte, 1840
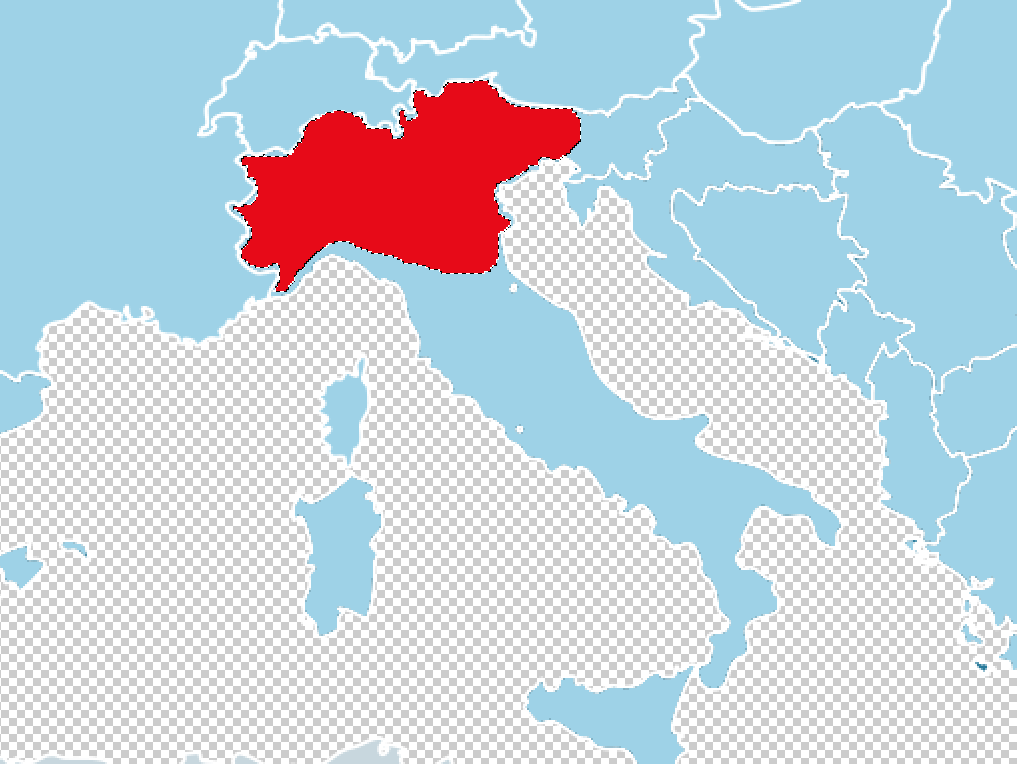

= Chondrostoma soetta =

Species of fish

Chondrostoma soetta, or the Italian nase, is a species of freshwater ray-finned fish belonging to the family Leuciscidae. It is found in Italy, Slovenia and Switzerland. Its natural habitats are rivers and freshwater lakes. It is threatened by habitat loss and predation and competition from introduced species such as roach, wels catfish and the common nase. It has been extirpated from Slovenia and numbers are declining in the Italian and Swiss lakes of Lake Como, Lake Lugano, Lake Maggiore, Lake Iseo and Lake Garda. Some population which are descended from fish introduced to other lakes in Italy appear to be thriving.
