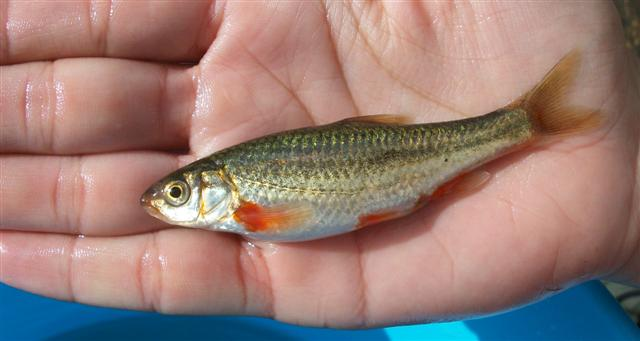

Conservation status
- Least Concern (IUCN 3.1)

Scientific classification
- Kingdom: Animalia
- Phylum: Chordata
- Class: Actinopterygii
- Division: Teleostei
- Order: Cypriniformes
- Family: Leuciscidae
- Genus: Achondrostoma
- Species: A. oligolepis

Binomial name
- Achondrostoma oligolepis (Robalo, Doadrio, V. C. Almada & Kottelat, 2005)
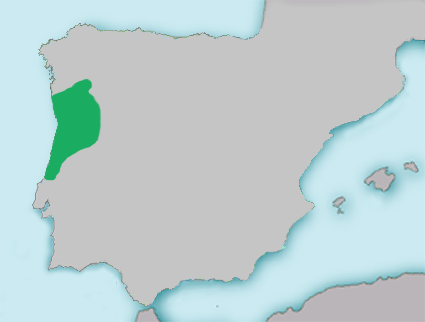

Synonyms
- Leuciscus macrolepidotus Steindachner, 1866; Chondrostoma macrolepidotus (Steindachner, 1866); Chondrostoma oligolepis Robalo, Doadrio, Almada & Kottelat, 2005

= Achondrostoma oligolepis =

Species of fish

Achondrostoma oligolepis, the ruivaco, is a species of freshwater ray-finned fish belonging to the family Leuciscidae, which includes the daces, Eurasian minnows and related fishes. This species is endemic to Portugal.

== Taxonomy ==
Achondrostoma oligolepis was first formally described as Leuciscus macrolepidotus in 1866 by the Austrian ichthyologist Franz Steindachner, with its type locality given as creeks near Alcobazar and Cintra, Portugal. This name was, however, invalid, as it was preoccupied by Leuciscus macrolepidotus Ayres, 1854. in 2005 Joana Isabel Robalo, Ignacio Doadrio Villarejo, Vítor Carvalho Almada and Maurice Kottelat proposed the replacement name Chondrostoma oligolepis. It is now classified as a valid species in the genus Achondrostoma within the subfamily Leuciscinae of the family Leuciscidae. The genus was proposed in 2007 for three species which were split from Chondrostoma on the basis of genetic evidence.

== Etymology ==
Achondrostoma oligolepis belongs to the genus Achondrostoma. This name places the prefix a-, meaning "without", in front of the genus name Chondrostoma, which is a combination of chondros, a word meaning "gristle" or "cartilage", and stoma, meaning "mouth". This is an allusion to the lack of the horny plates in the mouths of these fishes, which are present in Chondrostoma. The specific name, oligolepis, combines oligo, meaning "few", and lepis, which means "scale", a reference to the larger and, therefore, fewer scales.

== Description ==
Achondrostoma oligolepis differs from other species in its genus by having between 30 and 38 scales in its lateral line; 3 or 4 scale rows are found between the lateral line and the origin of the pelvic fin; the caudal peduncle has 11 or 12 rows of scales around it; the diameter of the eye diameter is smaller than the length of the snout, which is rounded and obtuse; and the ventral profile of head has a marked angle at the articulation of the lower jaw. The ruivaco has a maximum total length of 25 cm (9.8 in), although 15 cm (5.9 in) is more typical.

== Distribution and habitat ==
Achondrostoma oligolepis is endemic to Portugal, where it is found in the Âncora River system south to the Arnoia and Real rivers, both of which drain into the Óbidos coastal lagoon system to the north of Lisbon. The ruivaco is a habitat generalist and inhabits slow-moving, low-lying rivers and streams which have aquatic vegetation and substrates of sand or gravel.
