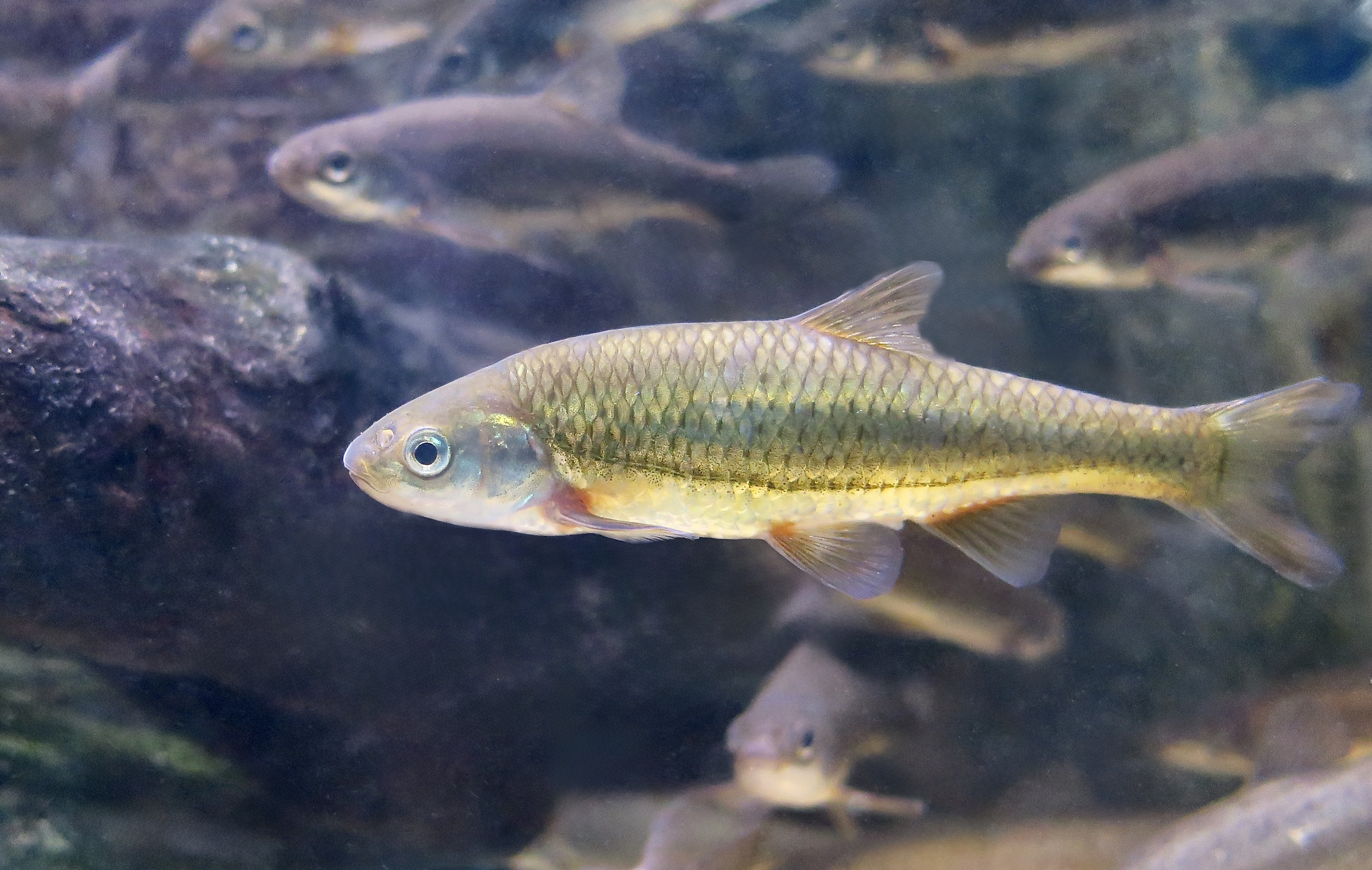

Conservation status
- Critically Endangered (IUCN 3.1)

Scientific classification
- Kingdom: Animalia
- Phylum: Chordata
- Class: Actinopterygii
- Order: Cypriniformes
- Family: Leuciscidae
- Subfamily: Leuciscinae
- Genus: Achondrostoma
- Species: A. occidentale

Binomial name
- Achondrostoma occidentale (Robalo, V. C. Almada, Sousa Santos, Moreira & Doadrio, 2005)
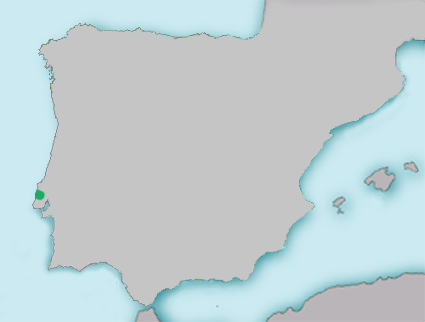
- Range of Achondrostoma occidentale

Synonyms
- Chondrostoma occidentale Robalo, Almada, Sousa Santos, Moreira & Doadrio, 2005

= Achondrostoma occidentale =

Species of fish

Achondrostoma occidentale, also known as the Western ruivaco, is a species of freshwater ray-finned fish belonging to the family Leuciscidae, which includes the daces. Eurasian minnows and related fishes. This species is endemic to Portugal to the north of Lisbon on the Atlantic slope of western Portugal.

== Taxonomy ==
Achondrostoma occidentale was first formally described as Chondrostoma occidentale in 2005 by the ichthyologists Joana Isabel Robalo, Vítor Carvalho Almada, Carla Sousa Santos, M. Inês Moreira and Ignacio Doadrio with its type locality given as the Safarujo River at Mafra and the Safarujo basin in Portugal. The Western ruivaco is now classified as a valid species in the genus Achondrostoma within the subfamily Leuciscinae of the family Leuciscidae.

== Etymology ==
Achondrostoma occideetale belongs to the genus Achondrostoma, this name places the prefix a-, meaning "without", in front of the genus name Chondrostoma, which is a combination of chondros, a word meaning "gristle" or "cartilage", with stoma, meaning "mouth". This is an allusion to the lack of the horny plates in the mouths of these fishes, which are present in Chondrostoma . The specific name, occidentale, means "western" and is a reference to this species distribution within the Oeste area of Portugal, oeste meaning "west".

== Description ==
Achondrostoma occidentale differs from other species in its genus by having 40-43 canaliculate scales on the lateral line with 6 or 7 scales above and 2 or 3 scales below the lateral line. The axillary pelvic scale is shorter than or equal to the base of the pelvic fin. There are 14 scale rows around the caudal peduncle, the diameter of the eye exceeds the length of the snout. The snout is typically conical and pointed and there is no obvious angle at articulation of lower jaw on the ventral profile of the head. This species has a maximum standard length of 9.5 cm (3.7 in).

== Distribution and habitat ==
Achondrostoma occidentale is endemic to a small area of western Portugal along the Atlantic coast north of Lisbon. Here it has been recorded from the Alcabrichel, Sizandro and Safarujo rivers. These are short seasonal rivers, much of which dry out in the summer when the fish take refuge in permanent pools until the rain comes in the autumn and winter.

== Conservation ==
Achondrostoma occidentale is classified as Critically endangered by the International Union for Conservation of Nature and is threatened by habitat degradation by pollution and the introduction of invasive species.
