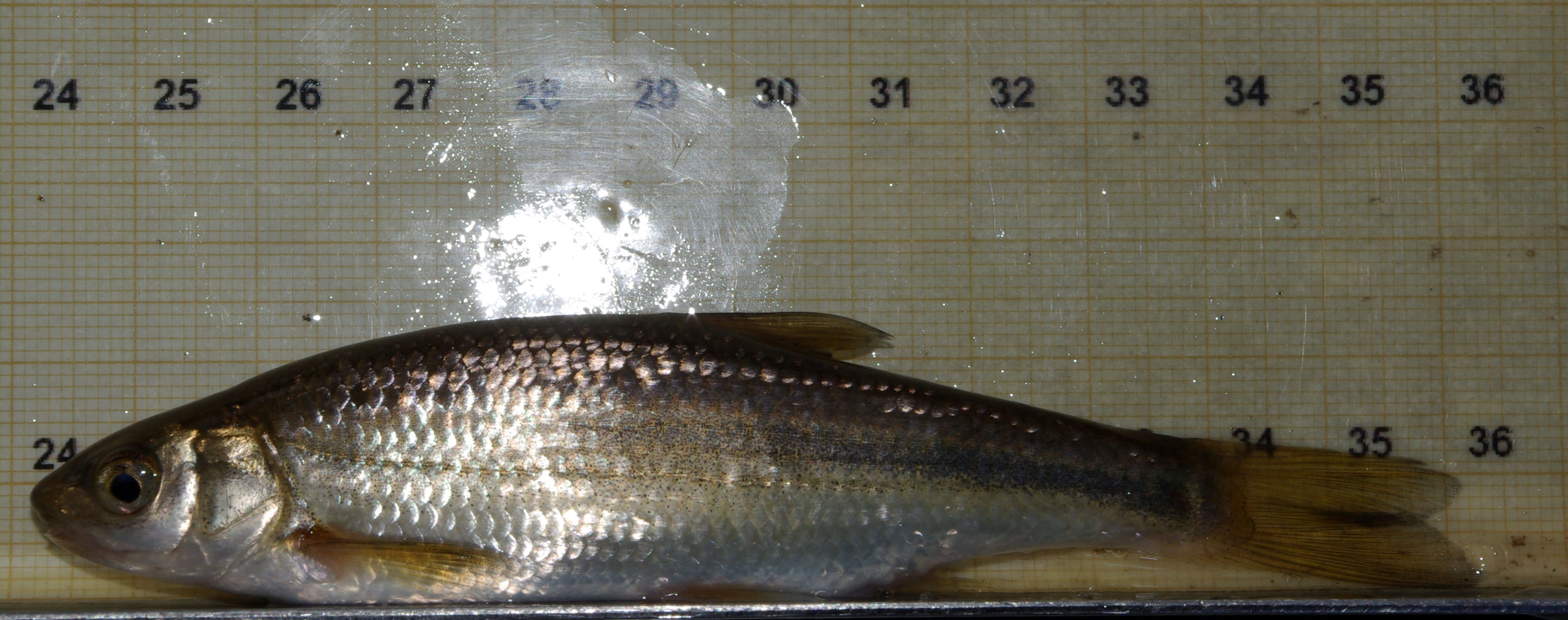

Conservation status
- Near Threatened (IUCN 3.1)

Scientific classification
- Kingdom: Animalia
- Phylum: Chordata
- Class: Actinopterygii
- Order: Cypriniformes
- Family: Leuciscidae
- Subfamily: Leuciscinae
- Genus: Parachondrostoma
- Species: P. miegii

Binomial name
- Parachondrostoma miegii Steindachner, 1866
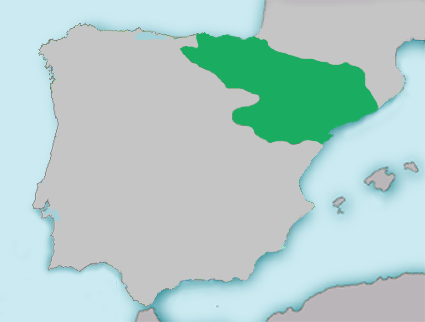

Synonyms
- Chondrostoma miegii Steindachner, 1866

= Parachondrostoma miegii =

Species of fish

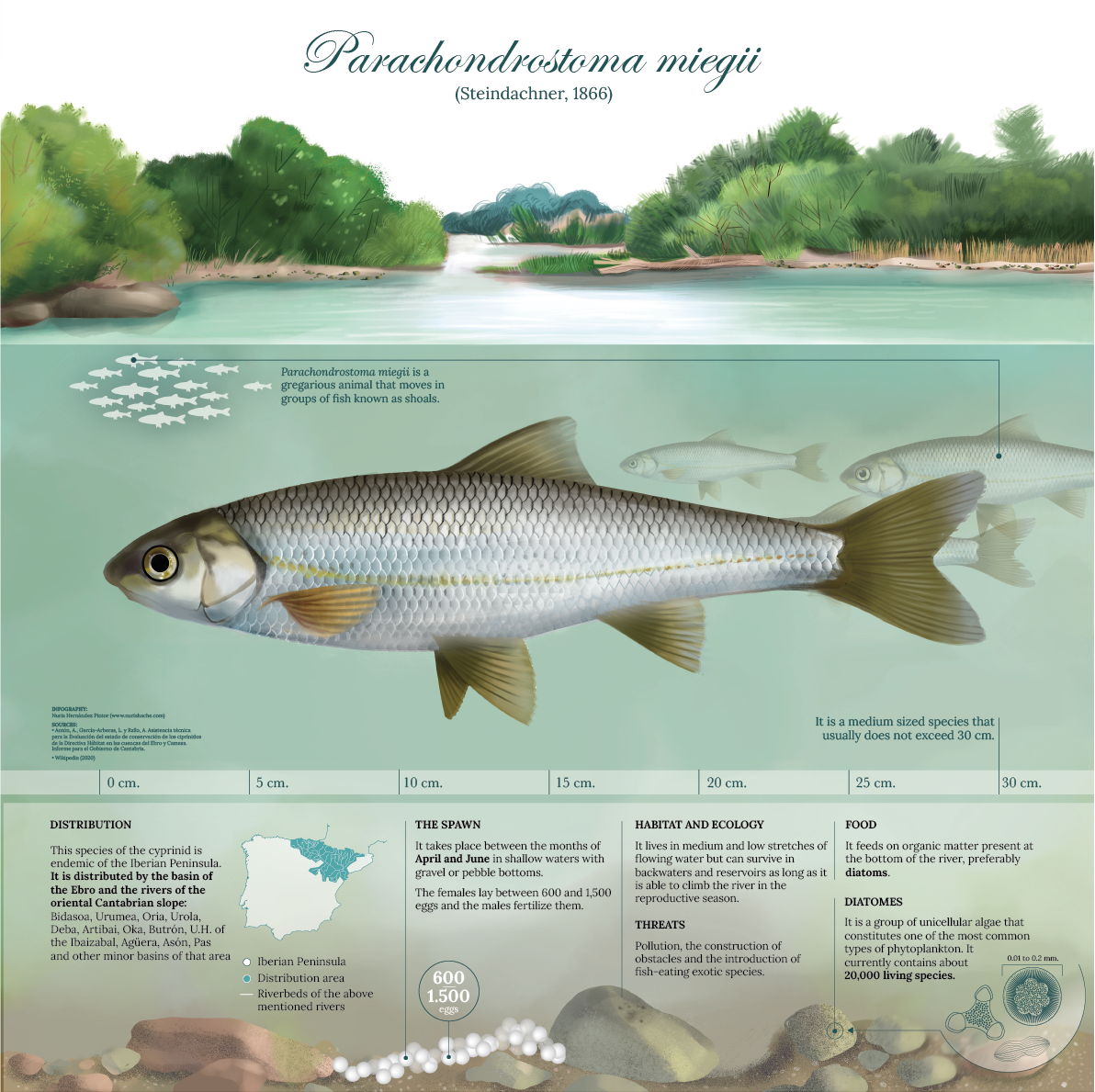
Infographic about Parachondrostoma miegii.

Parachondrostoma miegii, the Ebro nase, is a species of freshwater ray-finned fish belonging to the family Leuciscidae, which includes the daces. Eurasian minnows and related fishes. This species is endemic to Spain.

== Taxonomy ==
Parachondrostoma miegii was first formally described as Chondrostoma miegii in 1866 by the Austrian ichthyologist Franz Steindachner with its type locality given as the Ebro River at Bilbao, Spain. It is now classified as a valid species in the genus Parachondrostoma within the subfamily Leuciscinae of the family Leuciscidae, this species being the type species of that genus. The genus was proposed in 2007 for four species which were split from Chondrostoma on the basis of genetic evidence.

== Etymology ==
Parachondrostoma miegii belongs to the genus Parachondrostoma, this name places the prefix para-, meaning "near to" or "similar to" in front of the genus name Chondrostoma, which is a combination of chondros, a word meaning "gristle" or "cartilage", with stoma, meaning "mouth". This is an allusion to the horny plates in the mouths of the fishes in Chondrostoma . The specific name, miegi, honours someone not identified by Steindachner but it may be the Swiss-Spanish naturalist Juan Mieg.

== Description ==
Parachondrostoma miegii can be told apart from its congeners by having a slightly pointed snout, the rostral cap is visible in a ventral view, the lateral line has between 45 and 56 scales and the standard length is between 3.7 and 4.4 times the depth. The Ebro nase has a maximum published standard length of 25 cm (9.8 in).

== Distribution and habitat ==
Parachondrostoma miegii is endemic to northeastern Spain, where it occurs in rivers draining to the Cantabrian and Mediterranean sea basins. In the Cantabrian Sea it is found from the Pas River in Cantabria to the Bidasoa River in the Basque Country. In the Mediterranean drainage, it is found from he Llobregat River in Catalonia southward to the Ebro and Cenia rivers in the Valencian Community. There is an isolated population, which is thought to be of this species, in the upper Tagus drainage above the Entrepeñas dam and reservoir in Castilla-La Mancha. The Ebro nase is found in fast-flowing, perennial river and stream stretches. However, in some of these waters there is a wide variation in water level, seasonally and annually, with some stretches drying out. When this happens some fishes use isolated permanent shady pools as refuges.
