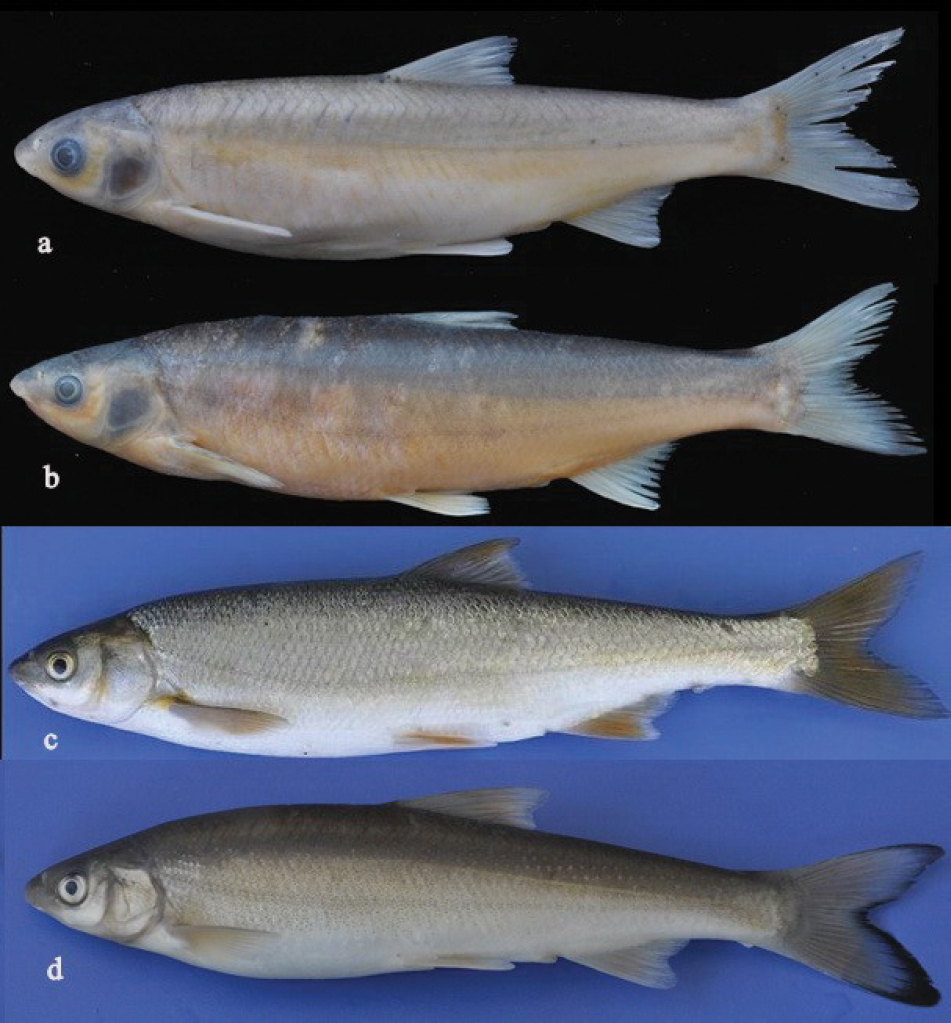
- An Orontes nase (labeled "c"), alongside other closely related nases

Conservation status
- Endangered (IUCN 3.1)

Scientific classification
- Kingdom: Animalia
- Phylum: Chordata
- Class: Actinopterygii
- Order: Cypriniformes
- Family: Leuciscidae
- Subfamily: Leuciscinae
- Genus: Chondrostoma
- Species: C. kinzelbachi

Binomial name
- Chondrostoma kinzelbachi Krupp, 1985

= Chondrostoma kinzelbachi =

Species of fish

Chondrostoma kinzelbachi, the Orontes nase or Levantine nase, is a species of nase, a genus of fish belonging to the family Leuciscidae. It is endemic to the Orontes River basin, historically occurring in Turkey and Syria. It is a fairly small freshwater fish, ranging from 11.8 centimetres (4.6 in) to 21.6 centimetres (8.5 in) SL.

The Orontes nase is distinguished from congeners by its usual pharyngeal tooth formula of 7-7, as well as by other subtle morphological traits, such as gill raker count and scale structure. It is particularly closely related to C. ceyhanensis and C. toros, with these three species forming an "eastern Mediterranean" clade; the Mesopotamian nase (C. regium) falls outside this clade, but is also a very close relative. These four species split from their closest relatives in the Balkans ~4.8 million years ago, and diversified further 2.5–3.0 Mya, coinciding with uplifting of the Anatolian Plateau.

As of 2013, the Orontes nase was assessed as endangered by the IUCN. Its range has been drastically reduced over the years, and it is probably now extirpated in Syria. Its decline is attributable to exploitation and pollution of local waterways; the two waterways it is still known to inhabit are also threatened by these factors, as well as reduced rainfall, worsened by climate change.
