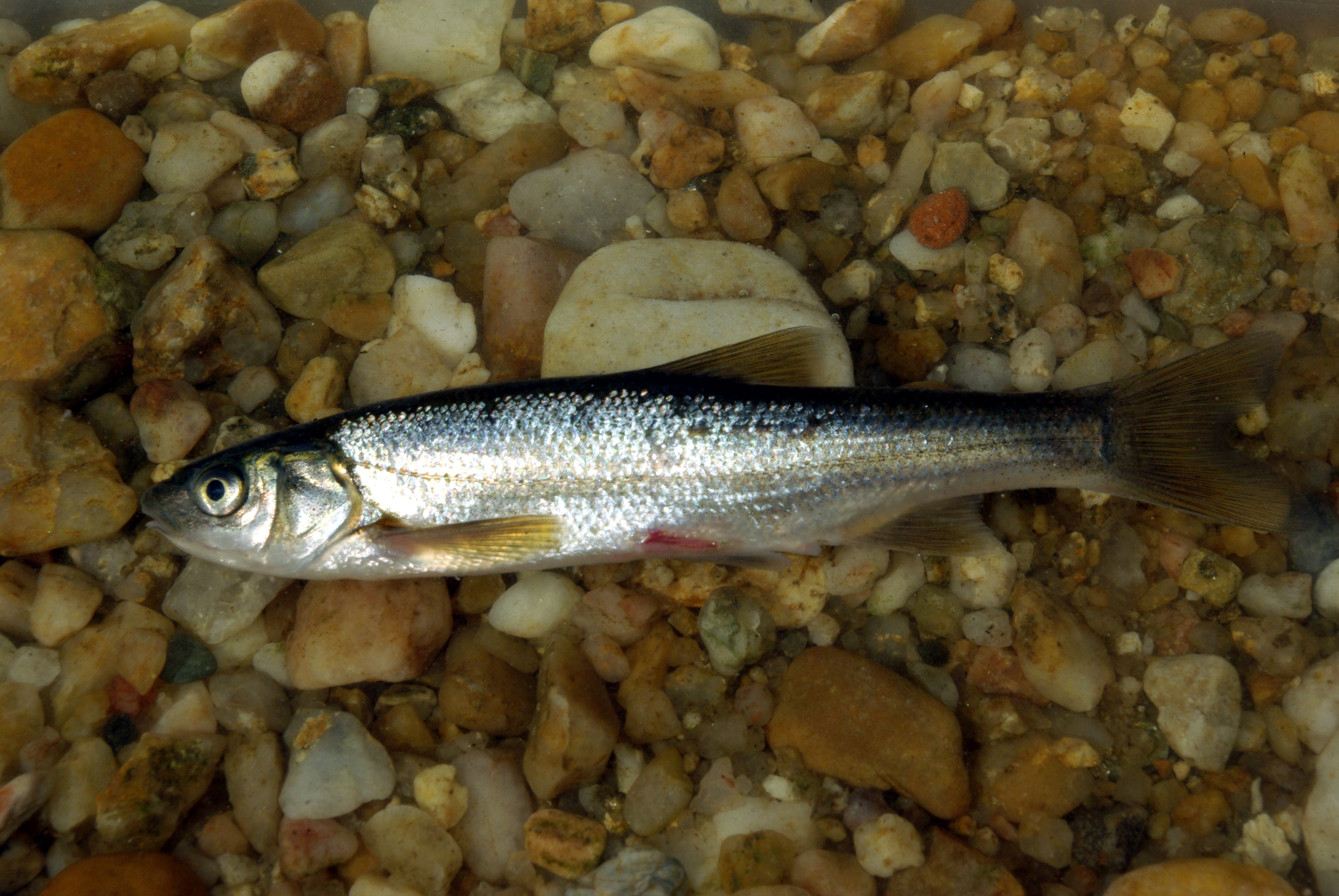

Conservation status
- Endangered (IUCN 3.1)

Scientific classification
- Kingdom: Animalia
- Phylum: Chordata
- Class: Actinopterygii
- Order: Cypriniformes
- Family: Leuciscidae
- Subfamily: Leuciscinae
- Genus: Achondrostoma
- Species: A. salmantinum

Binomial name
- Achondrostoma salmantinum Doadrio & Elvira, 2007
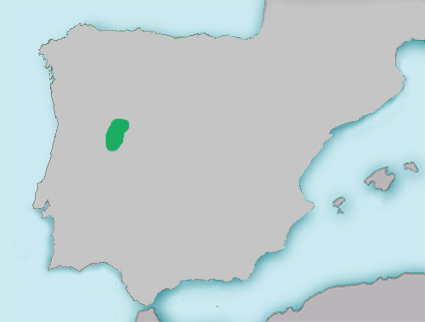

= Achondrostoma salmantinum =

Species of fish

Achondrostoma salmantinum, the sarda, is a species of freshwater ray-finned fish in the family Leuciscidae which includes the daces. Eurasian minnows and related fishes. This species is endemic to the Duero river system in the Province of Salamanca.

== Taxonomy ==
Achondrostoma salmantinum was first formally described in 2007 by Ignacio Doadrio and Benigno Elvira with its type locality given as the Huebra River, San Muñoz, Salamanca in the Duero basin. This species belongs to the genus Achondrostoma within the subfamily Leuciscinae of the family Leuciscidae. The genus was proposed in 2007 for three species which were split from Chondrostoma on the basis of genetic evidence.

== Etymology ==
Achondrostoma salmantinum belongs to the genus Achondrostoma, this name places the prefix a-, meaning "without", in front of the genus name Chondrostoma, which is a combination of chondros, a word meaning "gristle" or "cartilage", with stoma, meaning "mouth". This is an allusion to the lack of the horny plates in the mouths of these fishes, which are present in Chondrostoma . The specific name, salmantinum, means of Salamantia, this being the Roman name for Salamanca.

== Description ==
Achondrostoma salmantinum differs from other species in its genus by having between 44 and 53 scales in its lateral line and there are 2 spines and 7 branched fin rays in both the dorsal and anal fins. The sarda has a maximum total length of 6.8 cm (2.7 in) for males and 8.1 cm (3.2 in) for females.

== Distribution and habitat ==
Achondrostoma salmantinum is only known to occur in the Province of Salamanca in Spain where it is found in the Uces, Huebra and Águeda river systems. It may also occur in the Duoro basin in eastern Portugal. The sarda occurs in low-moving, low-lying rivers and streams which have aquatic vegetation and substrates of sand or gravel.
