= Chondrostoma holmwoodii =

Conservation status
- Vulnerable (IUCN 3.1)

Scientific classification
- Kingdom: Animalia
- Phylum: Chordata
- Class: Actinopterygii
- Order: Cypriniformes
- Family: Leuciscidae
- Subfamily: Leuciscinae
- Genus: Chondrostoma
- Species: C. holmwoodii

Binomial name
- Chondrostoma holmwoodii (Boulenger, 1896)

Synonyms
- Capoeta holmwoodii Boulenger, 1896

Species of fish

Chondrostoma holmwoodii, sometimes known as the Izmir nase or Eastern Aegean nase, is a species of ray-finned fish in the family Leuciscidae. It is endemic to Western Turkey. The specific name holmwoodii honours Frederic Holmwood, collector of the holotype and British consul-general at what then was Smyrna (now İzmir).

Chondrostoma holmwoodii grows to 28.2 cm (11.1 in) total length. It is a freshwater fish found in medium-sized streams to large rivers with rocky or gravel substrate and swift to moderately fast current. It is believed to be declining because of water pollution, water extraction, and dam construction. Also reduced rainfall associated with climate change is a threat.
