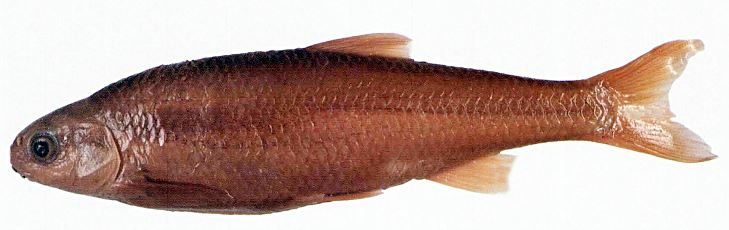

Conservation status
- Vulnerable (IUCN 3.1)

Scientific classification
- Kingdom: Animalia
- Phylum: Chordata
- Class: Actinopterygii
- Order: Cypriniformes
- Family: Leuciscidae
- Genus: Parachondrostoma
- Species: P. arrigonis

Binomial name
- Parachondrostoma arrigonis (Steindachner, 1866)
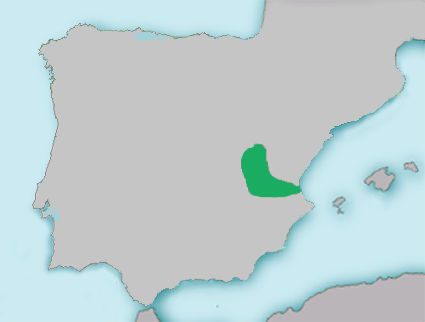

Synonyms
- Leuciscus arrigonis Steindachner, 1866; Chondrostoma arrigonis (Steindachner, 1866)

= Parachondrostoma arrigonis =

Species of fish

Parachondrostoma arrigonis, the Júcar nase, is a species of freshwater ray-finned fish belonging to the family Leuciscidae, which includes the daces. Eurasian minnows and related fishes. This species is endemic to Spain.

== Taxonomy ==
Parachondrostoma arrigonis was first formally described as Leuciscus arrigonis in 1866 by the Austrian ichthyologist Franz Steindachner with its type locality given as Laguna de Uña and Júcar River near Cuenca in Spain. It is now classified as a valid species in the genus Parachondrostoma within the subfamily Leuciscinae of the family Leuciscidae. The genus was proposed in 2007 for four species which were split from Chondrostoma on the basis of genetic evidence.

== Etymology ==
Parachondrostoma arrigonis belongs to the genus Parachondrostoma, this name places the prefix para-, meaning "near to" or "similar to" in front of the genus name Chondrostoma, which is a combination of chondros, a word meaning "gristle" or "cartilage", with stoma, meaning "mouth". This is an allusion to the horny plates in the mouths of the fishes, in Chondrostoma . The specific name, arrigonis, honours Professor Arrigo of Valencia, a "dear friend" of Steindachner's who died of cholera in 1865.

== Description ==
Parachondrostoma arrigonis can be told apart from other members of its genus by its blunt snout, the rostral cap is hidden by the upper lip in ventral view; the lateral line has between 41 and 50 scales and the depth of the body fits into its standard length 4.4-5.6 times. The Júcar nase has a maximum standard length of 25 cm (9.8 in).

== Distribution and habitat ==
Parachondrostoma arrigonis is endemic to the Júcar River and adjacent Albufera de València wetland basin in the autonomous communities of Castilla–La Mancha and the Valencian Community in eastern Spain. This species is typically found in small, shallow stretches, less than 20 m (66 ft) wide and 1 m (3 ft 3 in) deep, where there is riparian vegetation. Within these stretches these fishes prefer relatively deep pools where there is with a slow current and ample cover in the form of vegetation or fallen timber. It is also found in a few small lakes in karstic areas in the headwaters of the Júcar River drainage and it will enter reservoirs. The habitats preferred by the Júcar nase have wide variations in water levels and may dry up in some sections. However, some fishes use isolated permanent shady pools as refuges.
