= Beysehir nase =

Conservation status
- Endangered (IUCN 3.1)

Scientific classification
- Kingdom: Animalia
- Phylum: Chordata
- Class: Actinopterygii
- Order: Cypriniformes
- Family: Leuciscidae
- Subfamily: Leuciscinae
- Genus: Chondrostoma
- Species: C. beysehirense

Binomial name
- Chondrostoma beysehirense Bogutskaya, 1997

Species of fish

The Beysehir nase (Chondrostoma beysehirense) is a species of ray-finned fish in the family Cyprinidae. The species is found only in Turkey and is restricted to three streams flowing into Lake Beysehir, where it also occurs, in central Anatolia.
