= Chondrostoma prespense =

Conservation status
- Endangered (IUCN 3.1)

Scientific classification
- Kingdom: Animalia
- Phylum: Chordata
- Class: Actinopterygii
- Order: Cypriniformes
- Family: Leuciscidae
- Subfamily: Leuciscinae
- Genus: Chondrostoma
- Species: C. prespense

Binomial name
- Chondrostoma prespense S. L. Karaman, 1924

Species of fish

Chondrostoma prespense, the Prespa nase, is a species of freshwater ray-finned fish in the family Leuciscidae. It is endemic to the Prespa Lakes in Albania, Greece, and North Macedonia. Its natural habitats are rivers and freshwater lakes. It is threatened by habitat loss.
