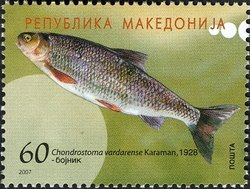

Conservation status
- Least Concern (IUCN 3.1)

Scientific classification
- Kingdom: Animalia
- Phylum: Chordata
- Class: Actinopterygii
- Order: Cypriniformes
- Family: Leuciscidae
- Subfamily: Leuciscinae
- Genus: Chondrostoma
- Species: C. vardarense

Binomial name
- Chondrostoma vardarense S. L. Karaman, 1928

= Chondrostoma vardarense =

Species of fish

Chondrostoma vardarense is a species of ray-finned fish in the family Leuciscidae. It is found in Bulgaria, Greece, North Macedonia, and Turkey. Its natural habitat is rivers. It is threatened by habitat loss.
