= Chondrostoma scodrense =

Conservation status
- Extinct (yes) (IUCN 3.1)

Scientific classification
- Kingdom: Animalia
- Phylum: Chordata
- Class: Actinopterygii
- Order: Cypriniformes
- Family: Leuciscidae
- Subfamily: Leuciscinae
- Genus: Chondrostoma
- Species: †C. scodrense

Binomial name
- †Chondrostoma scodrense Elvira, 1987

Extinct species of fish

Chondrostoma scodrense is a species of freshwater ray-finned fish belonging to the family Leuciscidae. This species is classified as extinct by the IUCN Red List of Threatened Species.

The species was described from nine specimens caught in the late 19th Century. Its habitat in the late 19th century included Lake Skadar and its surroundings in Montenegro and Albania. Since then, in spite of intensive investigations of its only known previous range, in the 1980s, 1990s and 2003, no specimens have been recorded.
