= Chondrostoma meandrense =

Conservation status
- Vulnerable (IUCN 3.1)

Scientific classification
- Kingdom: Animalia
- Phylum: Chordata
- Class: Actinopterygii
- Division: Teleostei
- Order: Cypriniformes
- Family: Leuciscidae
- Subfamily: Leuciscinae
- Genus: Chondrostoma
- Species: C. meandrense

Binomial name
- Chondrostoma meandrense Elvira, 1987

Species of fish

Chondrostoma meandrense, sometimes called the Menderes nase or Işıklı nase, is a species of ray-finned fish in the family Leuciscidae. It is found only in Turkey. Its natural habitat is rivers. It is threatened by habitat loss.
