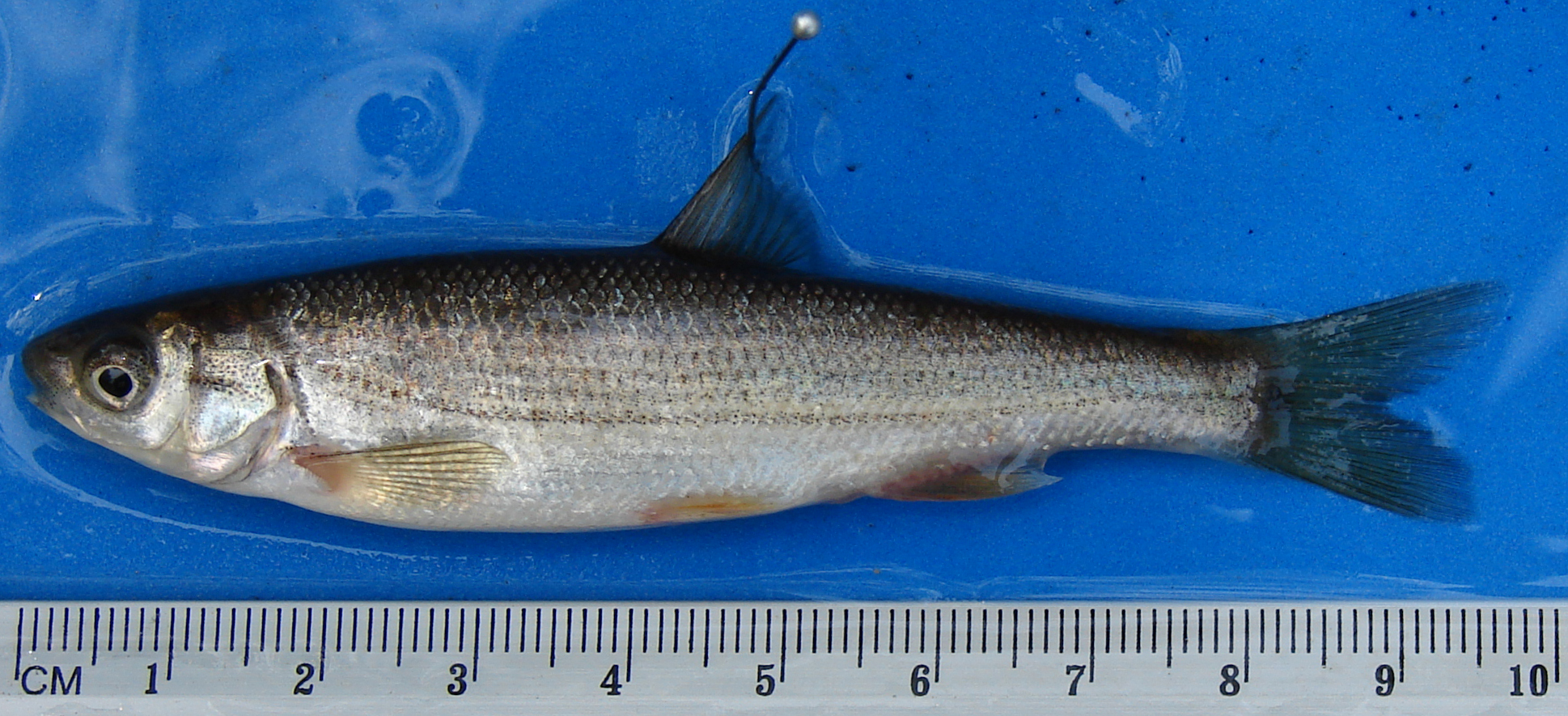

Conservation status
- Near Threatened (IUCN 3.1)

Scientific classification
- Kingdom: Animalia
- Phylum: Chordata
- Class: Actinopterygii
- Order: Cypriniformes
- Family: Leuciscidae
- Subfamily: Leuciscinae
- Genus: Pseudochondrostoma
- Species: P. willkommii

Binomial name
- Pseudochondrostoma willkommii (Steindachner, 1866)
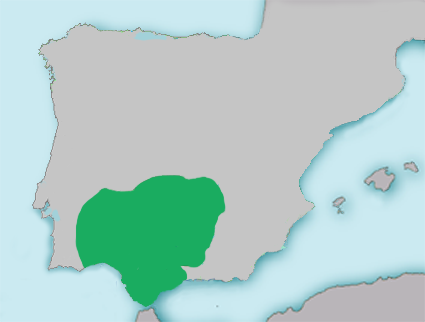
- Distribution of P. willkommii

Synonyms
- Chondrostoma willkommii Steindachner, 1866

= Pseudochondrostoma willkommii =

Species of fish

Pseudochondrostoma willkommii, the Southern straight-mouth nase, is a species of freshwater ray-finned fish belonging to the family Leuciscidae, which includes the daces, Eurasian minnows and related species. This species is endemic to the Iberian Peninsula in Spain and Portugal.

== Taxonomy ==
Pseudochondrostoma willkommii was first formally described in 1866 as Chondrostoma willkommii by the Austrian ichthyologist Franz Steindachner with its type locality given as several localities in Spain and Portugal. It is now classified in the genus Pseudochondrostoma within the subfamily Leuciscinae of the family Leuciscidae. This genus was proposed in 2007 for three species which were split from Chondrostoma on the basis of genetic evidence.

== Etymology ==
Pseudochondrostoma willkommii is classified in the genus Pseudochondrostoma, a name which prefixes Chondrostoma with pseudo- which means "false", applied because although the fishes in this genus are similar in appearance to the nases in the genus Chondrostoma such similarities are due to convergent evolution rather than common ancestry, and are therefore "false". The specific name, willkommii, is an eponym but Steindachner did not explain whi was honouring with this name. It is thought most likely to be the German botanist Heinrich Moritz Willkomm, who studied the Flora of the Iberian Peninsula.

== Description ==
Pseudochondrostoma duriense is told apart from other members of the genus Pseudochondrostoma by its slightly arched lower jaw, having between 60 and 70 scales along the lateral line, the anal fin has 8 1/2 branched rays and the upper body is marked with many black spots. This species has a maximum standard length of 40 cm (16 in).

== Distribution and habitat ==
Pseudochondrostoma willkommii is endemic to the Southern Iberian Peninsula where it is found in the drainage systems of the Guadiana, Odiel and Guadalquivir, as well as some coastal rivers in southwestern Spainfrom the Guadalete east to the Velez. The Southern straight-mouth nase is found in perennial lowland river channels and larger tributaries. It has colonised some reservoirs where they can reach suitable spawning habitat upstream.

== Biology ==
Pseudochondrostoma willkommii has a diet dominated by periphyton, with some detritus and benthic invertebrates. The periphyton is scraped from the surface of submerged surfaces with its specialised mouthparts. The spawning season runs from April to July, depending on location and environmental conditions such as water temperature. At this time the mature adults migrate upstream to beds of gravel or other coarse substrates in shallow, fast-flowing water. The breeding males develop many small nuptial tubercles on the head and body. The juveniles and a few subadults are reported to remain in upstream habitats all year, preferring riffles and runs with submerged cover. Many rivers and streams in Northwestern Iberia are characterised by very variable seasonal discharges and the upper reaches may have their water levels lowered significantly or they may completely dry in the summer. Some subadult fishes thus endure such periods of drought by taking refuge in deeper relict pools.

== Conservation ==
Pseudochondrostoma willkommii is classified as Near-threatened by the International Union for Conservation of Nature. The threats to this species include habitat modification, pollution, climate change and invasive species.
