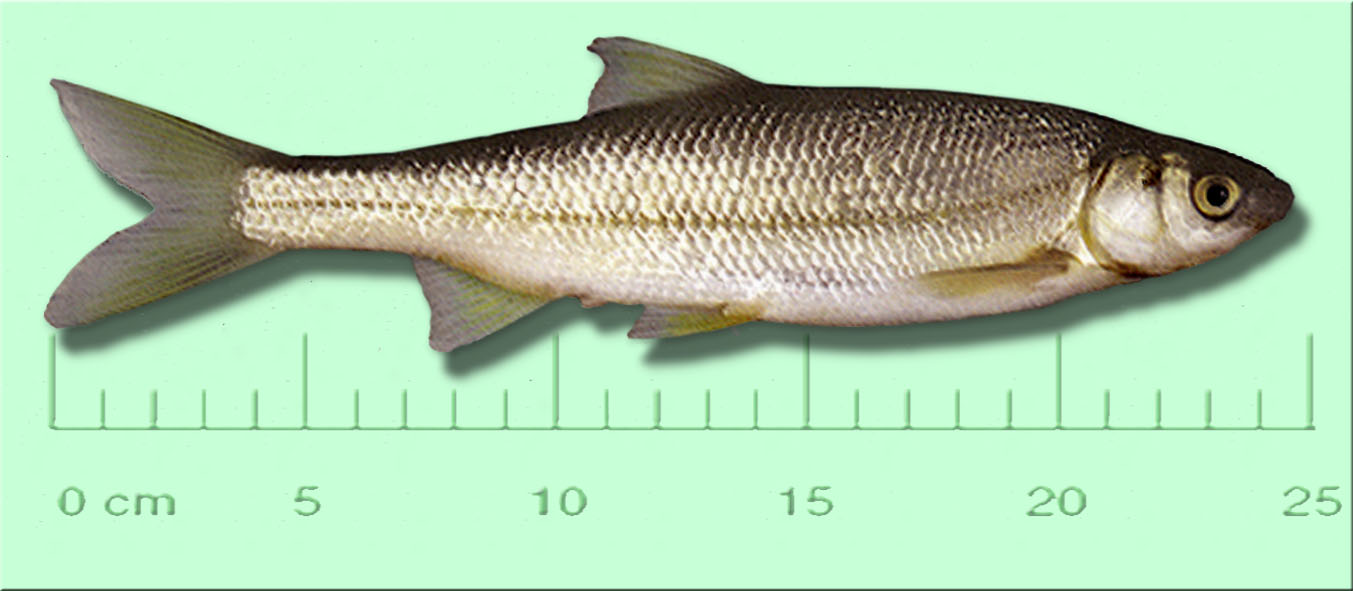

Conservation status
- Near Threatened (IUCN 3.1)

Scientific classification
- Kingdom: Animalia
- Phylum: Chordata
- Class: Actinopterygii
- Order: Cypriniformes
- Family: Leuciscidae
- Subfamily: Leuciscinae
- Genus: Parachondrostoma
- Species: P. toxostoma

Binomial name
- Parachondrostoma toxostoma (Vallot, 1837)

Synonyms
- Cyprinus toxostoma Vallot, 1837; Chondrostoma toxostoma (Vallot 1837); Chondrostoma dremaei Blanchard, 1866; Chondrostoma rhodanensis Blanchard, 186; Chondrostoma peresi La Blanchère, 1873

= South-west European nase =

Species of fish

The South-west European nase (Parachondrostoma toxostoma), also known as the French nase, soiffe or soffie, is a species of freshwater ray-finned fish belonging to the family Leuciscidae, which includes the daces. Eurasian minnows and related fishes. This species is found in southern France, Switzerland and northern Spain.

== Taxonomy ==
Parachondrostoma toxostoma was first formally described as Cyprinus toxostoma in 1837 by the French naturalist and doctor Jacques-Nicolas Vallot with its type locality given as the River Saône near Pontailler in France. It is now classified as a valid species in the genus Parachondrostoma within the subfamily Leuciscinae of the family Leuciscidae. The genus was proposed in 2007 for four species which were split from Chondrostoma on the basis of genetic evidence.

== Etymology ==
Parachondrostoma toxostoma belongs to the genus Parachondrostoma, this name places the prefix para-, meaning "near to" or "similar to" in front of the genus name Chondrostoma, which is a combination of chondros, a word meaning "gristle" or "cartilage", with stoma, meaning "mouth". This is an allusion to the horny plates in the mouths of the fishes in Chondrostoma. The specific name, toxostoma, combines toxon, meaning "bow", with stoma, which means "mouth", a reference to the arched shape of the mouth.

== Description ==
Parachondrostoma toxostoma has its dorsal fin supported by 3 spines and between 7 and 9 soft rays while its anal fin is supported by 3 spines and between 8 and 11 soft rays. The caudal fin has 17 to 19 fin rays. The body is elongated, and this fish has a maximum total length of 30 cm (12 in) with a maximum published weight of 350 g (12 oz).

== Distribution and habitat ==
Parachondrostoma toxostoma is found in the Garonne, Dordogne and Adour drainage basins in France and in the rivers daring into the Mediterranean in France and Switzerland from the Berre to the Rhône. It has also been introduced into the Loire river system but it is currently restricted to Haute-Loire, here it is claimed the common nase (Chondrostoma nasus), another introduced species, is competing with the French nase. This species prefers streches of rivers and streams with a current and with rocky or stony substrates, it will enter reservoirs and canals too.

== Biology ==
Parachondrostoma toxostoma is a gregarious fish which feeds on diatoms and small invertebrates on the riverbed. They live for up to 10 years and are sexually mature after 3 years. The spawning season is short and occurs inn late May and early June, when the adults migrate upstream to stretches of river with coarse substrates where the spawn is released in groups, each female laying between 1,500 and 15,000 eggs.

== Conservation ==
Parachondrostoma toxostoma is classified as Near Threatened by the International. The threats to this species are anthropogenic degradation of its habitat due to pollution, agriculture, hydroelectric impoundments and the resultant changes to water levels. In the Rhône drainage it is also threatened by hybridisation with the common nase which has colonised that system through canals connecting it to the Rhine. Hybrids between the French nase and th common nase are ferile and can make of between 3 and 20% of the nase population. The common nase may also have introduced new parasites to the French nase which may reduce its competitive fitness.
