= Chondrostoma orientale =

Scientific classification
- Kingdom: Animalia
- Phylum: Chordata
- Class: Actinopterygii
- Order: Cypriniformes
- Family: Leuciscidae
- Subfamily: Leuciscinae
- Genus: Chondrostoma
- Species: C. orientale

Binomial name
- Chondrostoma orientale Bianco & Bănărescu, 1982

Species of fish

Chondrostoma orientale is a species of ray-finned fish in the genus Chondrostoma which is endemic to Iran.
