= Chondrostoma angorense =

Conservation status
- Least Concern (IUCN 3.1)

Scientific classification
- Kingdom: Animalia
- Phylum: Chordata
- Class: Actinopterygii
- Order: Cypriniformes
- Family: Leuciscidae
- Subfamily: Leuciscinae
- Genus: Chondrostoma
- Species: C. angorense

Binomial name
- Chondrostoma angorense Elvira, 1987

Species of fish

Chondrostoma angorense, the Ankara nase or Black Sea nase, is a species of freshwater ray-finned fish belonging to the family Leuciscidae. This species is endemic to northern Anatolia, Turkey, where it occurs in the drainages of the Sakarya and Kızılırmak Rivers, rivers that drain into the Black Sea.
