= Sanjala sam naše venčanje =

Studio album by Dragana Mirković
- Released: 1984
- Genre: Folk
- Label: Diskos

Dragana Mirković chronology
Sanjala sam naše venčanje (1984)	Umiljato oko moje (1985)

Sanjala sam naše venčanje (English: I Had a Dream About Our Wedding) is the first studio album by Serbian singer Dragana Mirković. It was released in 1984.

== Track listing ==
1. Imam dečka nemirnog
2. Uteši me, tužna sam
3. Znam da nosim prsten tvoj
4. Haljinica plave boje
5. Kača
6. Hej mladiću, baš si šik
7. Sanjala sam naše venčanje
8. Proleće je, samo meni nije
9. Tebi treba žena kao ja
