= Chondrostoma regium =

Conservation status
- Least Concern (IUCN 3.1)

Scientific classification
- Kingdom: Animalia
- Phylum: Chordata
- Class: Actinopterygii
- Order: Cypriniformes
- Family: Leuciscidae
- Subfamily: Leuciscinae
- Genus: Chondrostoma
- Species: C. regium

Binomial name
- Chondrostoma regium (Heckel, 1843)

Synonyms
- Chondochilus regius Heckel, 1843

Species of fish

Chondrostoma regium, sometimes known as the brond-snout or Mesopotamian nase, is a species of ray-finned fish in the genus Chondrostoma from Mesopotamia.
