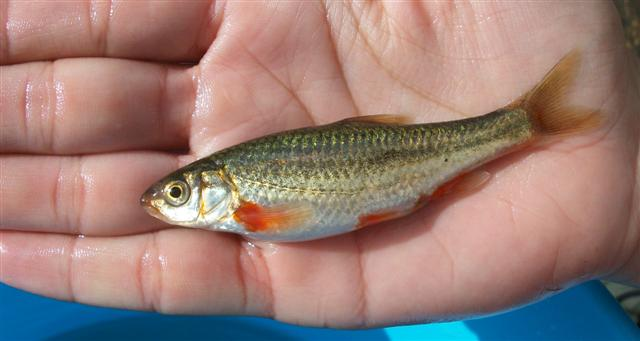
- Achondrostoma oligolepis

Scientific classification
- Kingdom: Animalia
- Phylum: Chordata
- Class: Actinopterygii
- Order: Cypriniformes
- Family: Leuciscidae
- Subfamily: Leuciscinae
- Genus: Achondrostoma; Robalo, Almada, Levy & Doadrio, 2007

Type species
- Leuciscus (Leucos) arcasii Steindachner, 1866

Species
- see text

= Achondrostoma =

Genus of fishes

Achondrostoma is a genus of freshwater fish in the family Leuciscidae, the daces and minnows. It is endemic to the Iberian Peninsula.

The genus was erected in 2007 for three fish separated from genus Chondrostoma on the basis of genetic evidence. Later that year a population of Iberochondrostoma lemmingii was separated on the basis of morphological and phylogenetic data and described as the fourth species of Achondrostoma, though this move was later reversed.

== Species ==
Species include:

- Achondrostoma arcasii (Steindachner, 1866)
- Achondrostoma asturicense Doadrio, Casal-López & Perea, 2023
- Achondrostoma garzonorum Doadrio, Casal-López & Perea, 2023
- Achondrostoma numantinum Doadrio, Casal-López & Perea, 2023
- Achondrostoma occidentale (Robalo, Almada, Sousa Santos, Moreira & Doadrio, 2005)
- Achondrostoma oligolepis (Robalo, Doadrio, Almada & Kottelat, 2005)
- Achondrostoma salmantinum Doadrio & Elvira, 2007
