= Colchic nase =

Conservation status
- Least Concern (IUCN 3.1)

Scientific classification
- Kingdom: Animalia
- Phylum: Chordata
- Class: Actinopterygii
- Order: Cypriniformes
- Family: Leuciscidae
- Subfamily: Leuciscinae
- Genus: Chondrostoma
- Species: C. colchicum

Binomial name
- Chondrostoma colchicum Derjugin, 1899

Species of fish

The Colchic nase (Chondrostoma colchicum), or Transcaucasian nase, is a species of freshwater fish in the family Leuciscidae. Its distribution is south of the Caucasus, and it is reported from Russia, Armenia, Azerbaijan, Georgia and Turkey.
