= Kuban's nase =

Conservation status
- Least Concern (IUCN 3.1)

Scientific classification
- Domain: Eukaryota
- Kingdom: Animalia
- Phylum: Chordata
- Class: Actinopterygii
- Order: Cypriniformes
- Family: Leuciscidae
- Subfamily: Leuciscinae
- Genus: Chondrostoma
- Species: C. kubanicum

Binomial name
- Chondrostoma kubanicum L. S. Berg, 1914

Species of fish

Kuban's nase or Kuban nase (Chondrostoma kubanicum) is a species of freshwater fish in the family Cyprinidae.

It is found in the Kuban River drainage in the North Caucasus region in Russia.
