= Uces =

River in Spain

Coordinates: 41°14′20″N 6°34′15″W

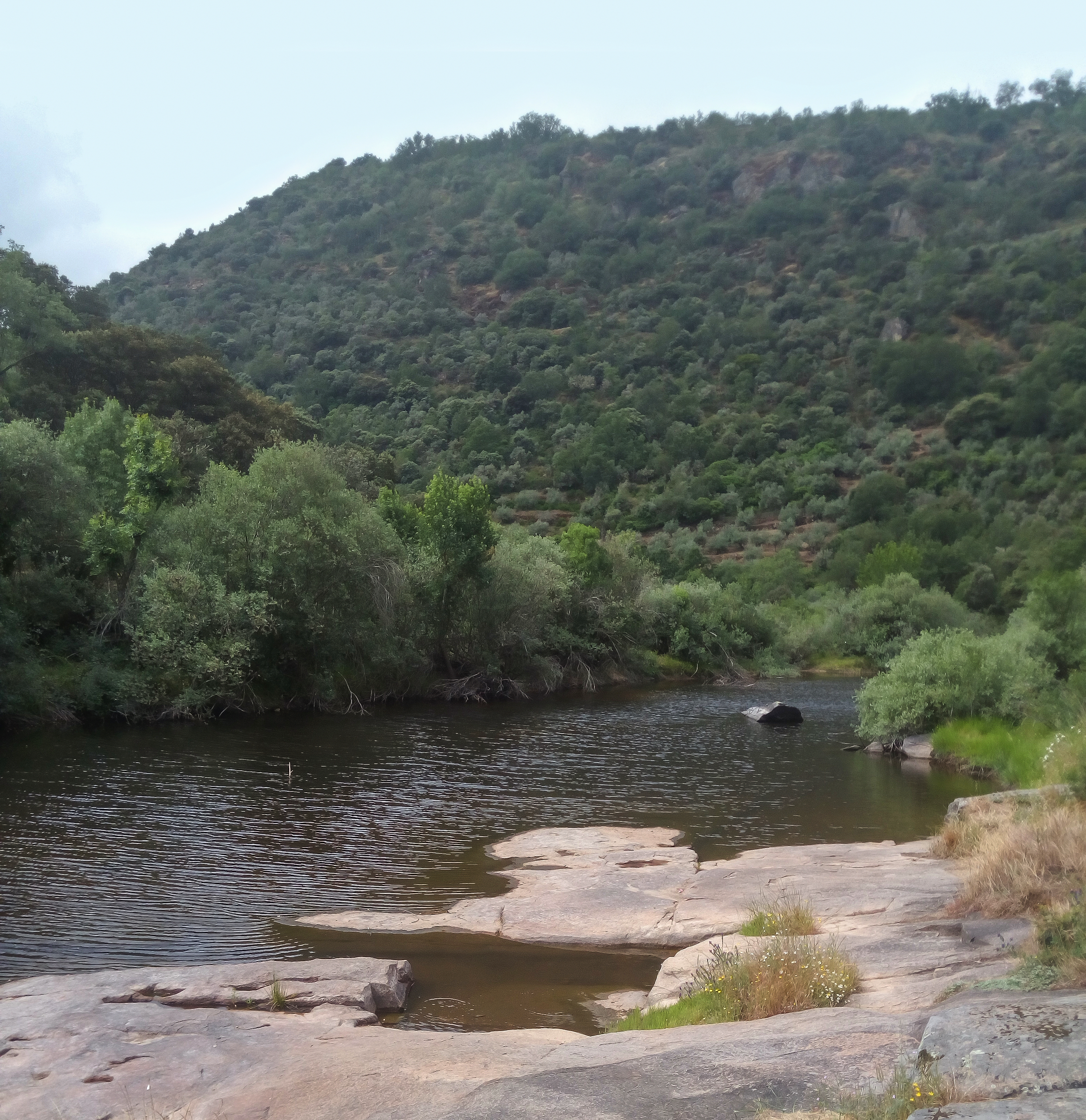

Location
- Country: Spain

The Uces is a river in Salamanca province, tributary of the Douro.

This small Spanish river has its origin in Puertas, near Ledesma, in the province of Salamanca, and it is about 45 km long. The Uces River, tributary of the Douro River and formed by the confluence of multiple streams, is named so after the crossing village Las Uces. It is a river with a huge flow during winter and spring, which sometimes creates floods that routinely cross all the old stone bridges. By contrast, the river is almost dry during the summer months. The Uces River, in its last part before merging with the Douro River, has eroded the surrounding granite landscape and it has formed one of the most famous waterfalls of the area, the Smoking Waterfall ("Pozo de los Humos") which is part of the Uces River. This spectacular waterfall is about 40 m high. As wetland, the environment of the Uces River hosts a rich fauna, with a number of herons and egrets, birds of prey (golden eagle, peregrine falcon and eagle owl), the white stork (occasionally you can see couples of black storks passing by), kingfishes and other various birds including mallards as well as otters. Dragonflies and autochthonous mackerels (Achondrostoma Salmantinum), are now seen frequently.
