= Terek nase =

Conservation status
- Least Concern (IUCN 3.1)

Scientific classification
- Kingdom: Animalia
- Phylum: Chordata
- Class: Actinopterygii
- Order: Cypriniformes
- Family: Leuciscidae
- Subfamily: Leuciscinae
- Genus: Chondrostoma
- Species: C. oxyrhynchum

Binomial name
- Chondrostoma oxyrhynchum Kessler, 1877

Species of fish

The Terek nase (Chondrostoma oxyrhynchum) is a species of freshwater ray-finned fish belonging to the family Leuciscidae. It is distributed in rivers of the western Caspian Sea basin, in Azerbaijan and Russia. It prefers fast-flowing waters in the foothill and mountain ranges, with rocky or gravel bottoms.
