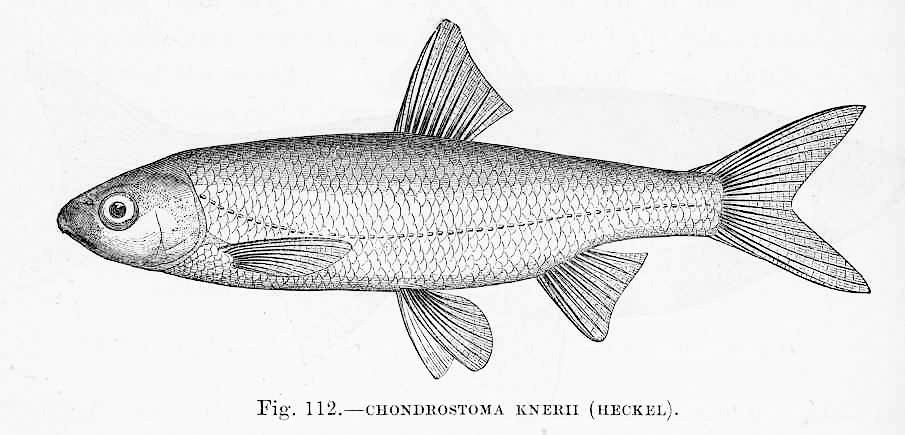

Conservation status
- Endangered (IUCN 3.1)

Scientific classification
- Kingdom: Animalia
- Phylum: Chordata
- Class: Actinopterygii
- Division: Teleostei
- Order: Cypriniformes
- Family: Leuciscidae
- Subfamily: Leuciscinae
- Genus: Chondrostoma
- Species: C. knerii

Binomial name
- Chondrostoma knerii Heckel, 1843

= Neretvian nase =

Species of fish

The Neretvian nase (Condrostoma knerii), or the Dalmatian nase, is s species of freshwater ray-finned fish belonging to the family Leuciscidae, which includes the daces, Eurasian minnows and related fishes. This species is endemic to the catchment of the Neretva in Croatia and Bosnia-Herzegovina.

== Taxonomy ==
The Neretvian nase was first formally described in 1843 by the Austrian ichthyologist Johann Jakob Heckel with its type locality given as the Neretva River in Dalmatia and Bosnia-Herzegovina. This species is classified in the genus Chondrostoma within the subfamily Leuciscinae of the family Leuciscidae/

== Etymology ==
The Neretvian nase is a member of the genus Chondrostoma, the name of this genus combines chondros, which is Greek for "gristle" or "cartilage", and stoma, which means "mouth", the fishes in this genus have a horny layer on the lower lip which was thought to be cartilage. The specific name is an eponym although Heckel did not identify the person honoured, however, it is almost certainly Heckel's colleague Rudolf Kner.

== Description ==
The Neretvian nase is told apart from the other Balkan nases in the possession of between 50 and 59 scales along the lateral line; the mouth is arched with the lower lip having a thin horny sheath; there are 8 to 9 1/2 branched rays in the dorsal fin. This species has a maximum total length of 29.4 cm (11.6 in).

== Distribution and habitat ==
The Neretvian nase is endemicto the drainage basin of the Neretva in the Dinaric karst Croatia and Bosnia-Herzegovina. It is a fish of perennial rivers and their associated lakes, sinkholes and springs.

== Conservation ==
The Neretvian nase is classified as Endangered by the International Union for Conservation of Nature. Threats to this species include damming and other forms of river regulation, pollution, water abstraction, dredging and gravel extraction, invasive species and, maybe, overfishing.
