= Kura nase =

Conservation status
- Least Concern (IUCN 3.1)

Scientific classification
- Kingdom: Animalia
- Phylum: Chordata
- Class: Actinopterygii
- Order: Cypriniformes
- Family: Leuciscidae
- Subfamily: Leuciscinae
- Genus: Chondrostoma
- Species: C. cyri

Binomial name
- Chondrostoma cyri Kessler, 1877

Species of fish

The Kura nase (Chondrostoma cyri), or southern Caspian nase, is a species of freshwater ray-finned fish belonging to the family Leuciscidae. This species occurs in the drainage systems of Kura and Aras rivers in Armenia, Georgia, Iran and Turkey.
