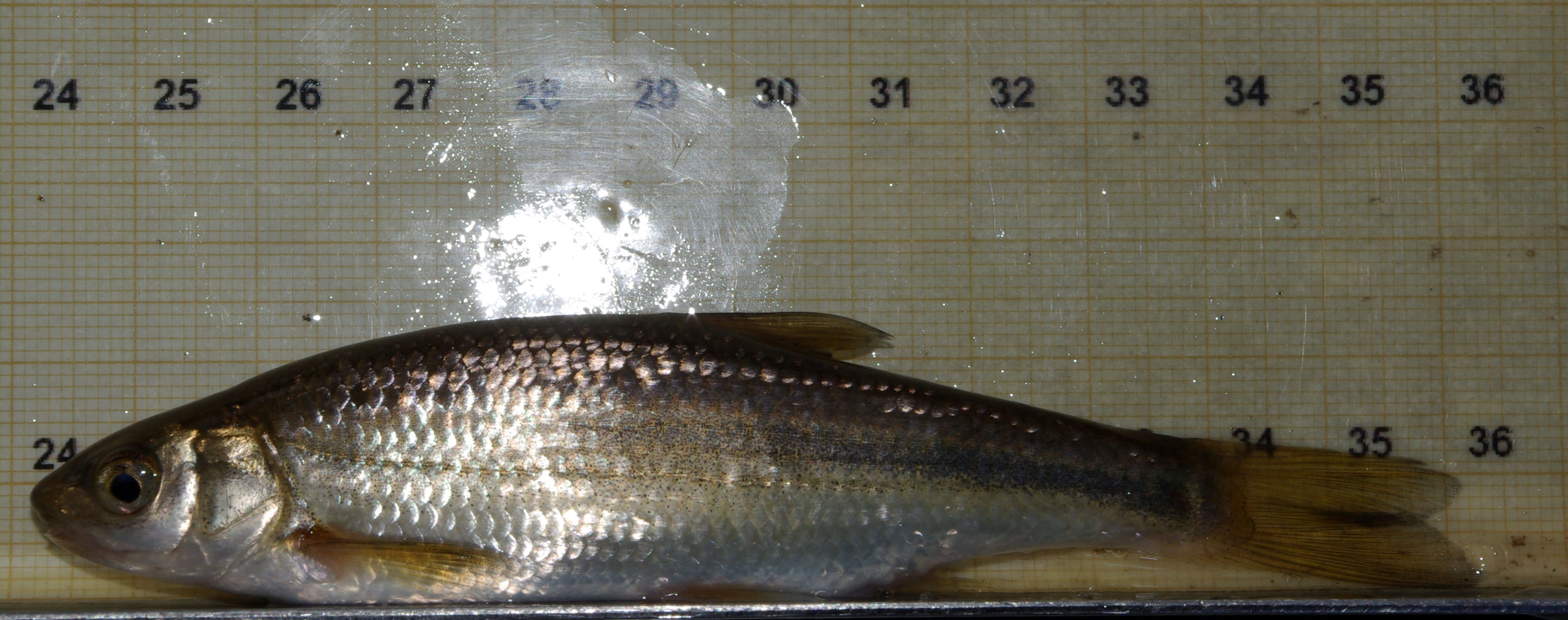
- Parachondrostoma miegii

Scientific classification
- Kingdom: Animalia
- Phylum: Chordata
- Class: Actinopterygii
- Order: Cypriniformes
- Family: Leuciscidae
- Subfamily: Leuciscinae
- Genus: Parachondrostoma; Robalo, V. C. Almada, Levy & Doadrio, 2007

Type species
- Chondrostoma miegii Steindachner 1866

= Parachondrostoma =

Genus of fishes

Parachondrostoma is a genus of freshwater ray-finned fish belonging to the family Leuciscidae, which includes the daces, Eurasian minnows and related species. This species in this genus are found mostly in Spain with one species entering France.

== Species ==
There are currently four recognized species in this genus:

- Parachondrostoma arrigonis (Steindachner, 1866) (Júcar nase)
- Parachondrostoma miegii (Steindachner, 1866) (Ebro nase)
- Parachondrostoma toxostoma (Vallot, 1837) (French nase)
- Parachondrostoma turiense (Elvira, 1987) (Turia nase)

== Conservation ==
According to the IUCN, Parachondrostoma turiense is an endangered species and Parachondrostoma arrigonis is critically endangered. The Parachondrostoma is endangered because the population constantly declines, but it is being protected by the European Natura 2000 Network. The European Natura 2000 Network helps Parachondrostoma by artificially breeding about 1,000 juvenile Parachondrostoma's.
