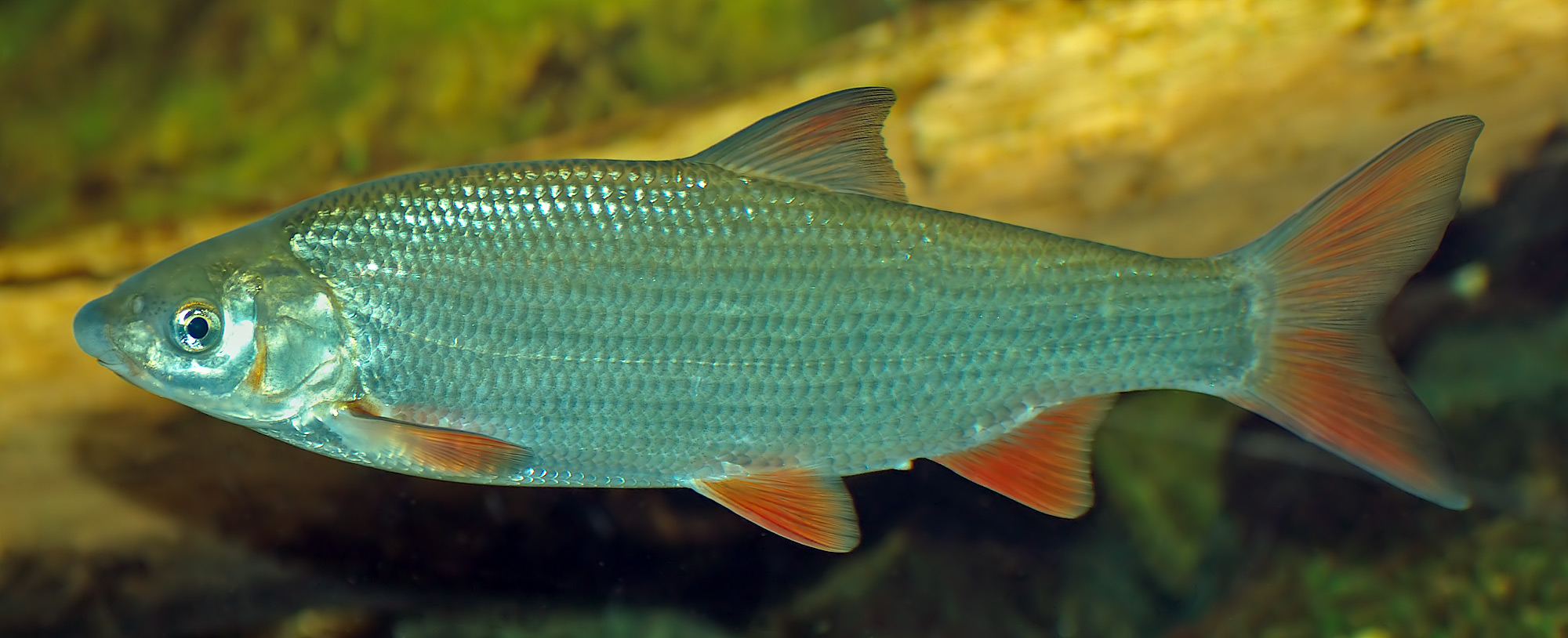

Conservation status
- Least Concern (IUCN 3.1)

Scientific classification
- Kingdom: Animalia
- Phylum: Chordata
- Class: Actinopterygii
- Order: Cypriniformes
- Family: Leuciscidae
- Subfamily: Leuciscinae
- Genus: Chondrostoma
- Species: C. nasus

Binomial name
- Chondrostoma nasus (Linnaeus, 1758)

Synonyms
- Cyprinus nasus Linnaeus, 1758; Chondrostoma ohridanum Karaman, 1924

= Common nase =

Species of fish

The common nase (Chondrostoma nasus) is a European potamodromous cyprinid fish. It is often simply called the nase, but that can refer to any species of its genus Chondrostoma. Another name is sneep.

== Distribution ==
The nase is found naturally in drainages of the Black Sea (Danube, Dniestr, Southern Bug, Dniepr), the southern Baltic Sea (Nieman, Odra, Vistula) and the southern North Sea (to Meuse in the west). Moreover, it has been introduced to the Rhône, Loire, Hérault, and Soca/Isonzo (Italy, Slovenia) drainages. It is a migratory fish. The fish is most important food source for a Danube salmon (Huchen).

== Appearance ==
The nase has a spindle shaped physique, with a blue-grey metallic-coloured scales and orange tail. It has relatively sharp lower lip. Generally, the fish range from 25 to 40 centimetres (9.8 to 15.7 in) in length, and weigh about 1 kg (2.2 lb). However, specimens have been recorded up to 58.5 cm (23.0 in) long and 3.4 kg (7.5 lb) in weight. The maximum recorded life span of the fish is 15 years.

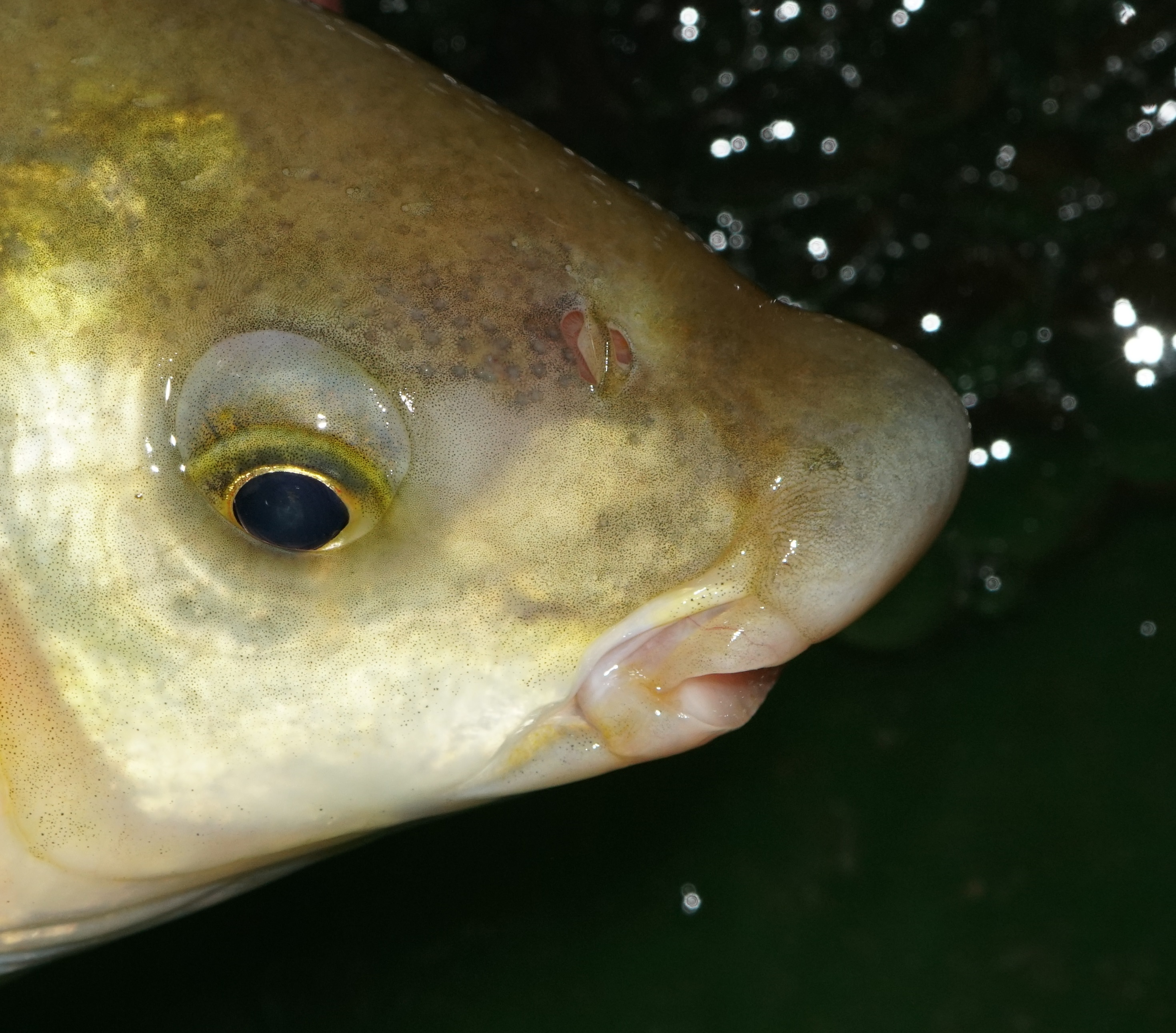
The nase has a typical head form.

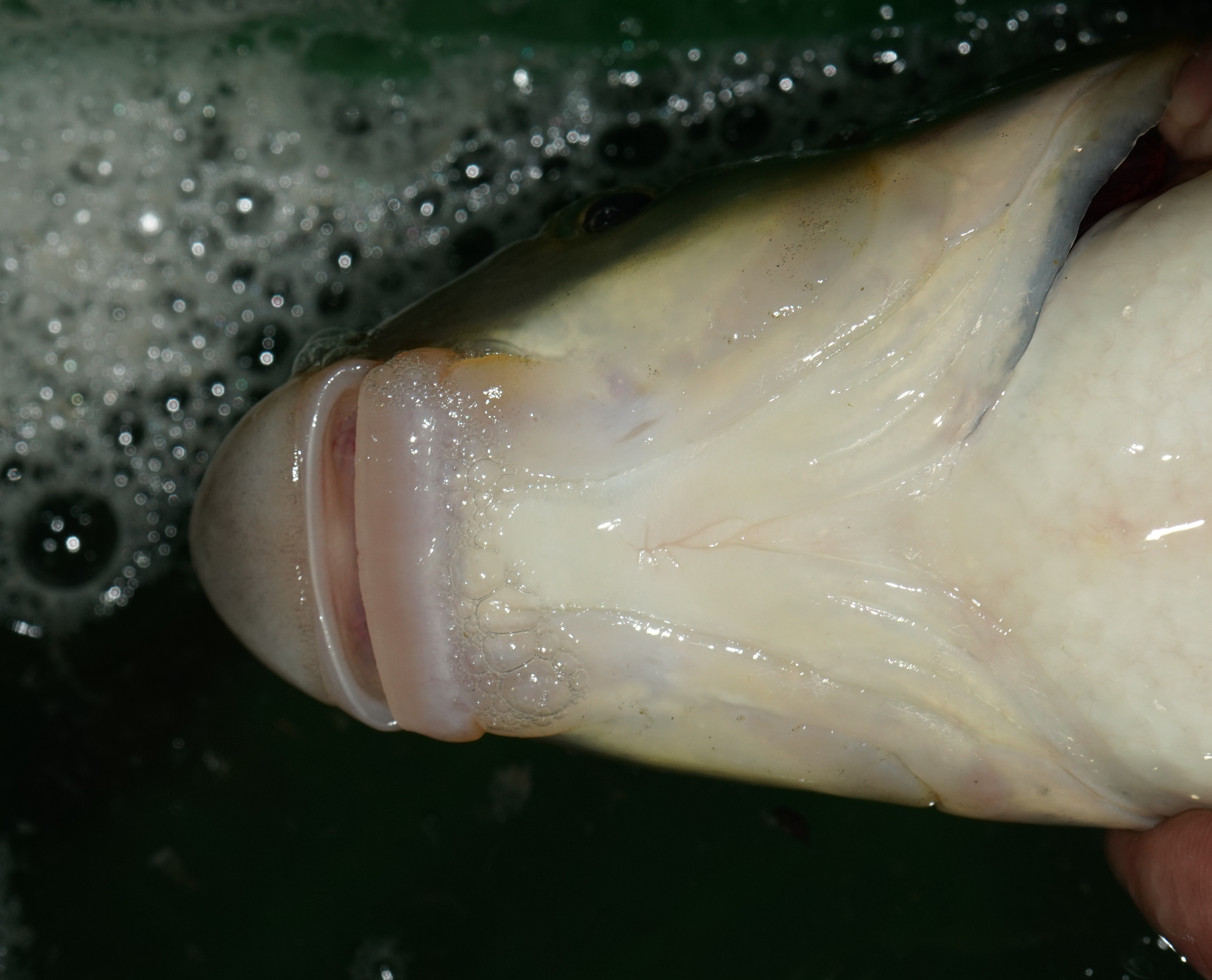
Mouth of the nase, seen from below

== Biology ==
This gregarious species is found in deep water with a fast current, often in the back waters of bridges or in rocky outcrops. It dwells near the bottom, where it feeds on algae, aquatic plants and invertebrates. Nase fish on the whole stay in shoals.

=== Description ===
The fish was first described by Carl Linnaeus in 1758.

== Protection ==
The nase is protected by the Convention on the Conservation of European Wildlife and Natural Habitats.
