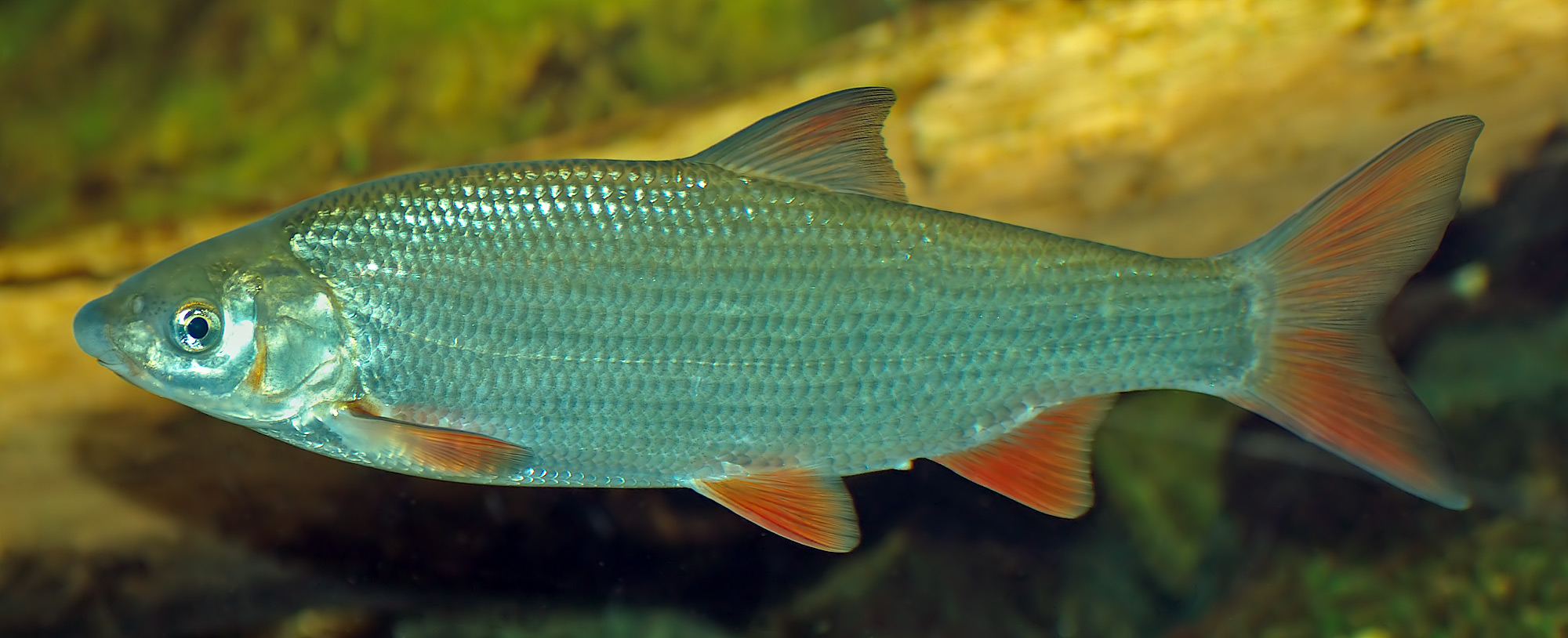
- Common nase, C. nasus. Note mouth to the lower left of eye.

Scientific classification
- Kingdom: Animalia
- Phylum: Chordata
- Class: Actinopterygii
- Order: Cypriniformes
- Family: Leuciscidae
- Subfamily: Leuciscinae
- Genus: Chondrostoma; Agassiz, 1832

Type species
- Cyprinus nasus Linnaeus, 1758

Species
- See text

Synonyms
- Chondrochilus Heckel, 1843; Chondrorhynchus Heckel, 1843; Machaerochilus Fitzinger, 1873; Nasus Basilewsky, 1855

= Chondrostoma =

Nases

Genus of fishes

Chondrostoma (from the Ancient Greek roots χόνδρος (khondros) 'lump' + στόμα (stoma) 'mouth' = 'lump-mouth') is a genus of ray-finned fish in the family Leuciscidae. They are commonly known as nases, although this term is also used locally to denote particular species, most frequently the common nase (C. nasus). The common name refers to the protruding upper jaw of these fishes; it is derived from the German term Nase 'nose'.

Several species have a very restricted range. Some of these endemics are very rare nowadays, and at least one species is globally extinct.

== Systematics ==
In 2007 it was determined that the presumed monophyletic group consisted of six at least partly independent lineages of Leuciscinae, meaning that the rasping feeding apparatus evolved more than once. It was proposed to split the genus in six in consequence: Achondrostoma, Chondrostoma, Iberochondrostoma, Pseudochondrostoma, Protochondrostoma and Parachondrostoma. But at least Achondrostoma and Iberochondrostoma may not be separable.

== Species ==
These are the currently recognized species in this genus:

- Chondrostoma angorense Elvira, 1987 (Ankara nase)
- Chondrostoma beysehirense Bogutskaya, 1997 (Beysehir nase)
- Chondrostoma ceyhanense Küçük, Turan, Güçlü, Mutlu & Çiftci, 2017
- Chondrostoma colchicum Derjugin, 1899 (Colchic nase)
- Chondrostoma cyri Kessler, 1877 (Kura nase)
- Chondrostoma esmaeilii Eagderi, Jouladeh-Roudbar, Birecikligil, Çiçek & Coad 2017
- Chondrostoma holmwoodii (Boulenger 1896) (Izmir nase)
- Chondrostoma kinzelbachi Krupp, 1985 (Orontes nase)
- Chondrostoma knerii Heckel, 1843 (Neretvan nase)
- Chondrostoma kubanicum Berg, 1914 (Kuban nase)
- Chondrostoma meandrense Elvira, 1987 (Menderes nase)
- Chondrostoma nasus (Linnaeus, 1758) (Common nase)
- Chondrostoma ohridanum Karaman, 1924
- Chondrostoma orientale Bianco & Bănărescu, 1982 (Iranian nase)
- Chondrostoma oxyrhynchum Kessler, 1877 (Terek nase)
- Chondrostoma phoxinus Heckel, 1843 (Minnow nase)
- Chondrostoma prespense Karaman, 1924 (Prespa nase)
- Chondrostoma regium (Heckel, 1843) (Mesopotamian nase)
- †Chondrostoma scodrense Elvira, 1987 (Skadar nase)
- Chondrostoma smyrnae Küçük, Çiftçi, Güçlü & Turan, 2021
- Chondrostoma soetta Bonaparte, 1840 (Italian nase)
- Chondrostoma toros Küçük, Turan, Güçlü, Mutlu & Çiftci, 2017
- Chondrostoma turnai Güçlü, Küçük, Turan, Çiftçi & Mutlu, 2018
- Chondrostoma vardarense Karaman, 1928 (Vardar nase)
- Chondrostoma variabile Yakovlev, 1870 (Volga undermouth)
