= Spanish art =

Diego Velázquez, Las Meninas (1656). Considered a masterpiece of Baroque art, the painting explores complex themes of perception, reality, and power. On display at the Museo del Prado, Madrid.

Francisco Goya, The Third of May 1808 (1814). A powerful indictment of war, the painting depicts the execution of Spanish civilians by Napoleon’s troops and is considered a foundational work of modern political art. Housed in the Museo del Prado, Madrid.

Spanish art has been an important contributor to Western art and Spain has produced many famous and influential artists including Velázquez, Goya and Picasso. Spanish art was particularly influenced by France and Italy during the Baroque and Neoclassical periods, but Spanish art has often had very distinctive characteristics, partly explained by the Moorish heritage in Spain (especially in Andalusia), and through the political and cultural climate in Spain during the Counter-Reformation and the subsequent eclipse of Spanish power under the Bourbon dynasty.

The prehistoric art of Spain had many important periods-it was one of the main centres of European Upper Paleolithic art and the rock art of the Spanish Levant in the subsequent periods. In the Iron Age large parts of Spain were a centre for Celtic art, and Iberian sculpture has a distinct style, partly influenced by coastal Greek settlements. Spain was conquered by the Romans by 200 BC and Rome was rather smoothly replaced by the Germanic Visigoths in the 5th century AD, who soon Christianized. The relatively few remains of Visigothic art and architecture show an attractive and distinct version of wider European trends. With the Umayyad conquest of Hispania in the 8th century there was a notable Moorish presence in art specially in Southern Iberia. Over the following centuries the wealthy courts of Al-Andalus produced many works of exceptional quality, culminating in the Alhambra in Granada, right at the end of Muslim Spain.

Meanwhile, the parts of Spain remaining Christian, or that were re-conquered, were prominent in Pre-Romanesque and Romanesque art. Late Gothic Spanish art flourished under the unified monarchy in the Isabelline Gothic and Plateresque styles, and the already strong traditions in painting and sculpture began to benefit from the influence of imported Italian artists. The enormous wealth that followed the flood of American gold saw lavish spending on the arts in Spain, much of it directed at religious art in the Counter-Reformation. Spanish control of the leading centre of North European art, Flanders, from 1483 and also of the Kingdom of Naples from 1548, both ending in 1714, had a great influence on Spanish art, and the level of spending attracted artists from other areas, such as El Greco, Rubens and (from a safe distance) Titian in the Spanish Golden Age, as well as great native painters such as Diego Velázquez, José de Ribera, Francisco de Zurbarán and Bartolomé Esteban Murillo.

Spanish Baroque architecture has survived in large quantity, and has both strains marked by exuberant extravagance, as in the Churrigueresque style, and a rather severe classicism, as in the work of Juan de Herrera. It was generally the former which marked the emerging art and Spanish Colonial architecture of the Spanish Empire outside Europe, as in Latin America (New Spanish Baroque and Andean Baroque), while the Baroque Churches of the Philippines are simpler. The decline of the Habsburg monarchy brought this period to an end, and Spanish art in the 18th and early-19th century was generally less exciting, with the huge exception of Francisco Goya. The rest of 19th-century Spanish art followed European trends, generally at a conservative pace, until the Catalan movement of Modernisme, which initially was more a form of Art Nouveau. Picasso dominates Spanish Modernism in the usual English sense, but Juan Gris, Salvador Dalí and Joan Miró are other leading figures.

== Ancient Iberia ==
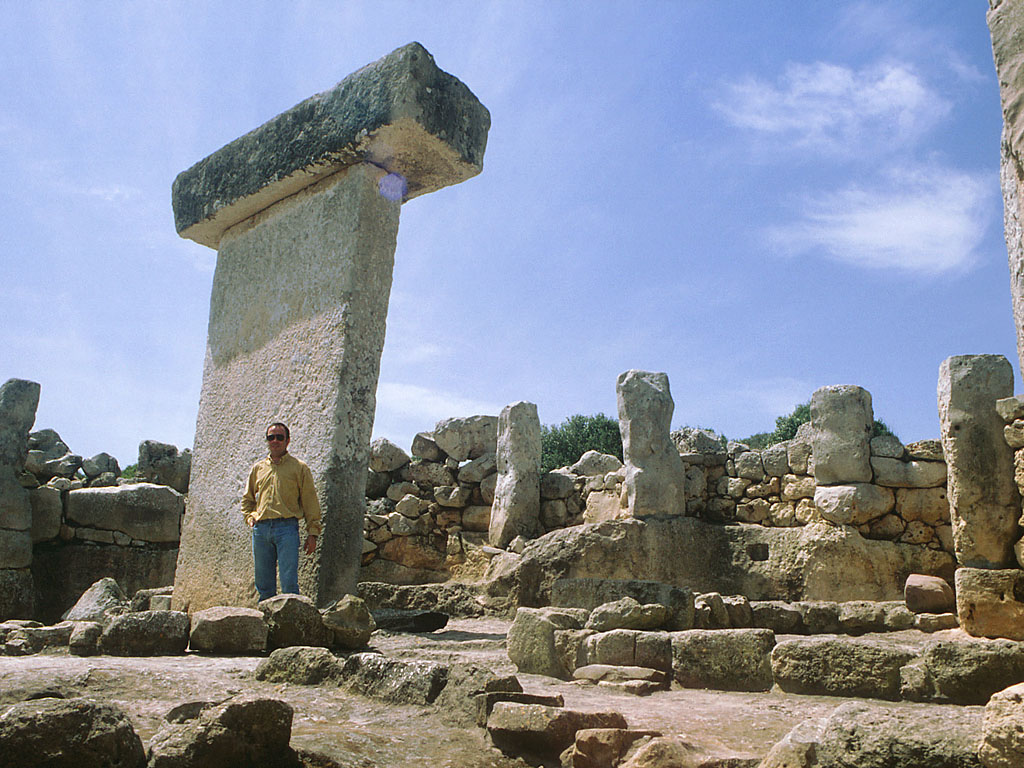
Talaiotic town of Torralba den Salord site, Menorca island

The early Iberians have left many remains; northern-western Spain shares with south-western France the region where the richest Upper Paleolithic art in Europe is found in the Cave of Altamira and other sites where there are cave paintings made between 35,000 and 11,000 BC. The Rock art of the Iberian Mediterranean Basin (as UNESCO term it) is from the eastern side of Spain, probably dating from about 8000–3500 BC, and shows animal and hunting scenes often developed with a growing feeling for the whole composition of a large scene. Portugal in particular is rich in megalithic monuments, including the Almendres Cromlech, and Iberian schematic art is stone sculpture, petroglyphs and cave paintings from the early metal ages, found all over the Iberian peninsula, with both geometric patterns, but also a higher usage of simple pictogram-like human figures than is typical of comparable art from other areas. The Casco de Leiro, a late Bronze Age gold ritual helmet, may relate to other golden hats found in Germany, and the Treasure of Villena is a huge hoard of geometrically decorated vessels and jewellery, perhaps from the 10th century BC, including 10 kilos of gold.

Iberian sculpture before the Roman occupation reflects the contacts with other advanced ancient cultures who set up small coastal colonies, including the Greeks and Phoenicians; the Sa Caleta Phoenician Settlement on Ibiza has survived to be excavated, where most now lie under large towns, and the Lady of Guardamar was excavated from another Phoenician site. The Lady of Elche (probably 4th century BC) possibly represents Tanit, but also shows Hellenistic influence, as do the 6th century Sphinx of Agost and Biche of Balazote. The Bulls of Guisando are the most impressive examples of verracos, which are large Celtiberian animal sculptures in stone; the 5th century BC Bull of Osuna is a more developed single example. Some decorated falcata, the distinctive curving Iberian sword, have survived, and large numbers of bronze statuettes used as votive offerings. The Romans gradually conquered all of Iberia between 218 BC and 19 AD.

As elsewhere in the Western Empire, the Roman occupation largely overwhelmed native styles; Iberia was an important agricultural area for the Romans, and the elite acquired vast estates producing wheat, olives and wine, with some later emperors coming from the Iberian provinces; many huge villas have been excavated. The Aqueduct of Segovia, Roman Walls of Lugo, Alcántara Bridge (104–106 AD), and the Tower of Hercules lighthouse are among a number of well-preserved major monuments, impressive remains of Roman engineering if not always art. Roman temples survive fairly complete at Vic, Évora (now in Portugal), and Alcántara, as well as elements in Barcelona and Córdoba. There must have been local workshops producing the high-quality mosaics found, though most of the better free-standing sculpture was probably imported. The Missorium of Theodosius I is an important Late Antique silver dish that was found in Spain but was probably made in Constantinople.

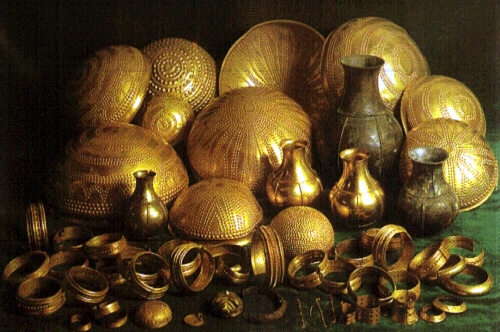
The Treasure of Villena, perhaps 10th century BC

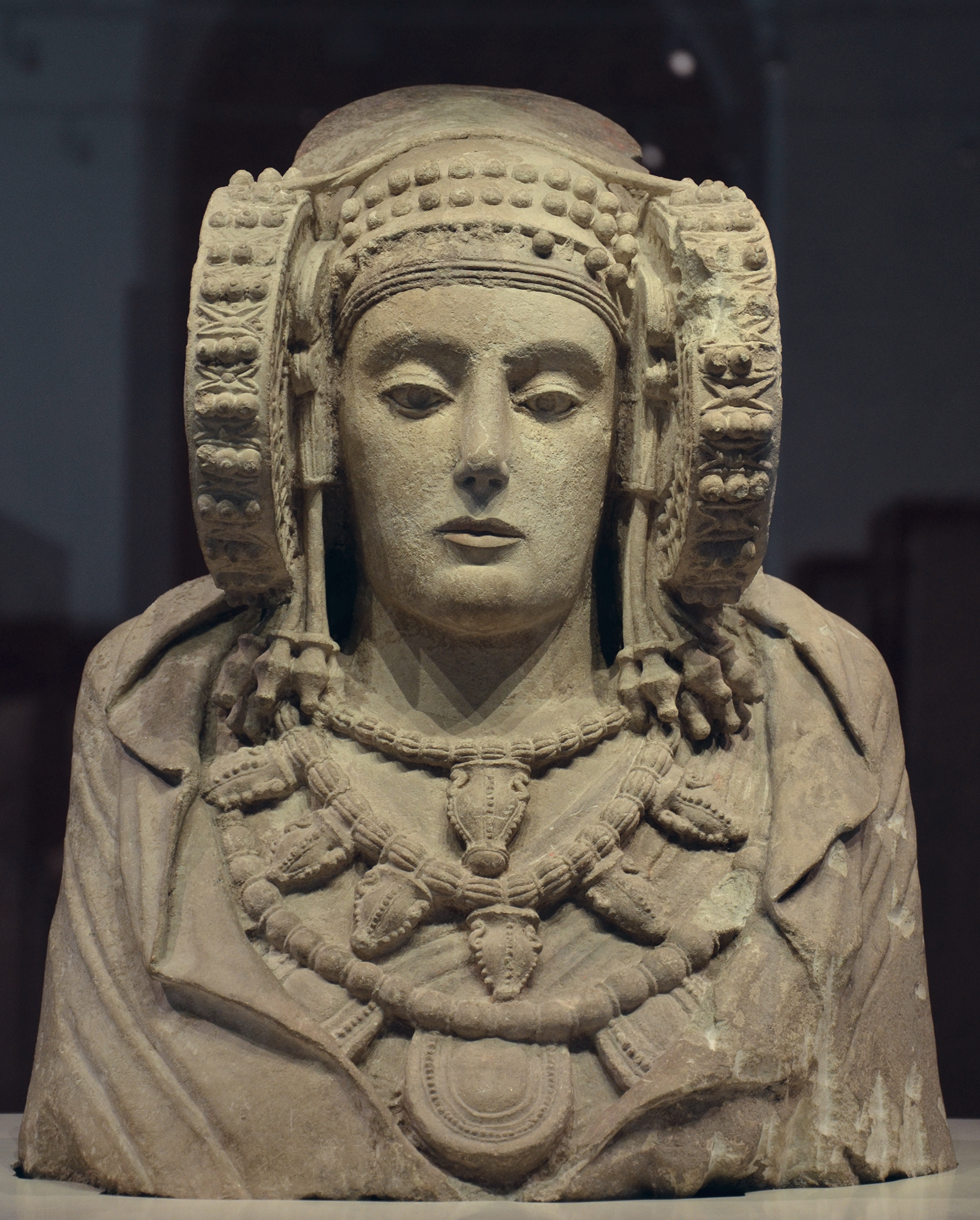
Lady of Elche from Elx, Valencian Community, 4th century BC

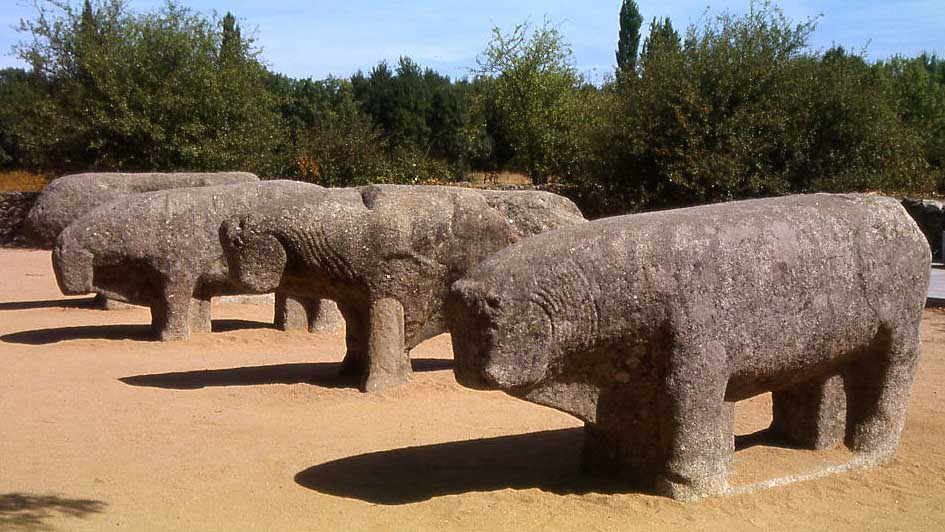
The Bulls of Guisando a Vettones verracos in El Tiemblo, province of Ávila

== Early Medieval ==
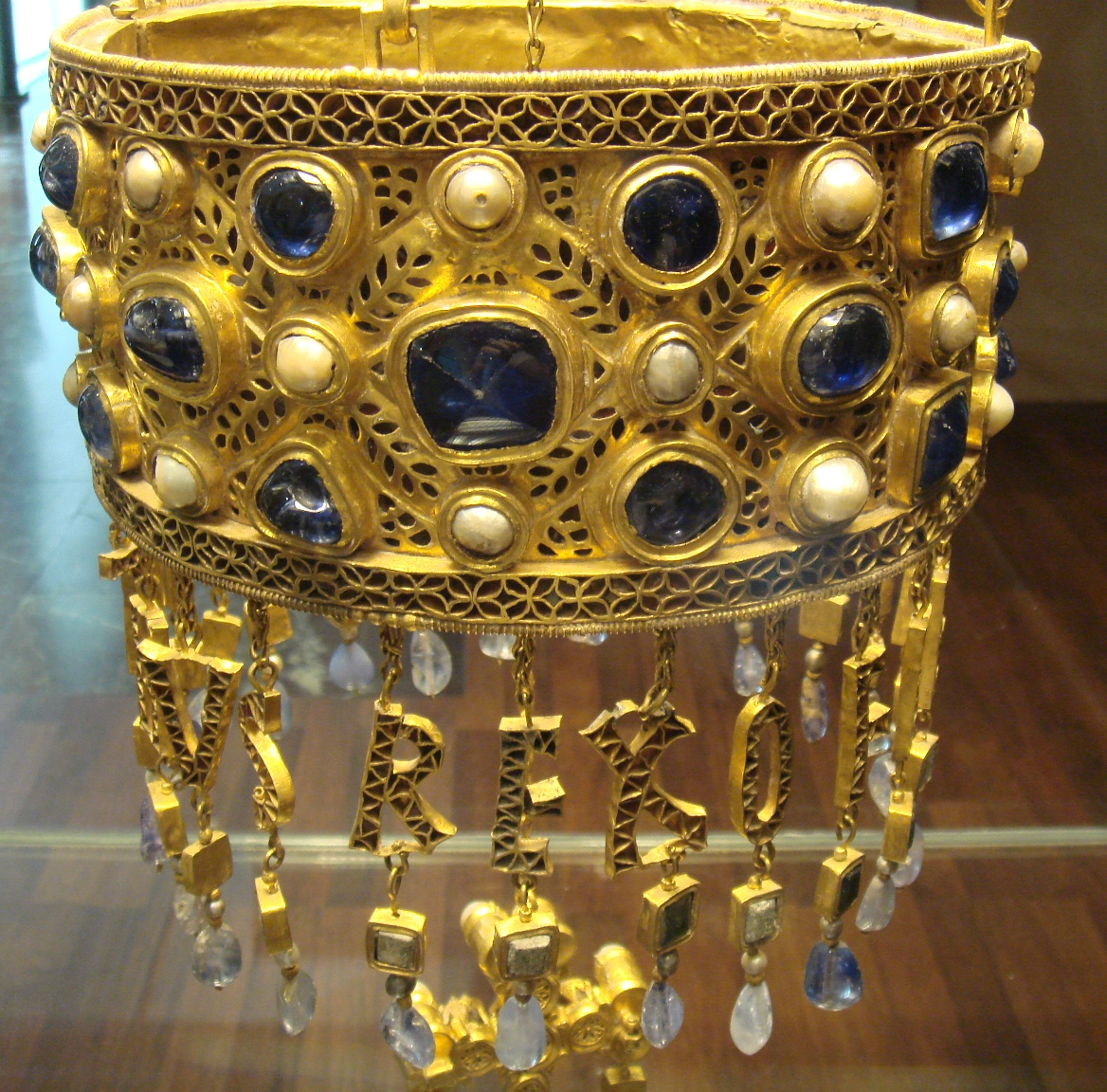
Detail of the votive crown of Reccesuinth, from the Treasure of Guarrazar, now in Madrid. The hanging letters spell [R]ECCESVINTUS REX OFFERET [King R. offers this].

The Christianized Visigoths ruled Iberia after the collapse of the Empire, and the rich 7th century Treasure of Guarrazar, probably deposited to avoid looting in the Muslim Conquest of Spain, is now a unique survival of Christian votive crowns in gold; though Spanish in style, the form was probably then used by elites across Europe. Other Visigothic art in the form of metalwork, mostly jewellery and buckles, and stone reliefs, survives to give an idea of the culture of this originally barbarian Germanic people, who kept themselves very largely separate from their Iberian subjects, and whose rule crumbled when the Muslims arrived in 711.

The jewelled crux gemmata Victory Cross, La Cava Bible and the Agate Casket of Oviedo are survivals from the 9-10th century of the rich Pre-Romanesque culture of the Asturias region in north-western Spain, which remained under Christian rule; the Santa María del Naranco banqueting house overlooking Oviedo, completed in 848 and later surviving as a church, is a unique survival in Europe. The Codex Vigilanus, completed in 976 in the region of Rioja, shows a complex mixture of several styles.

== Muslim and Mozarab Spain ==
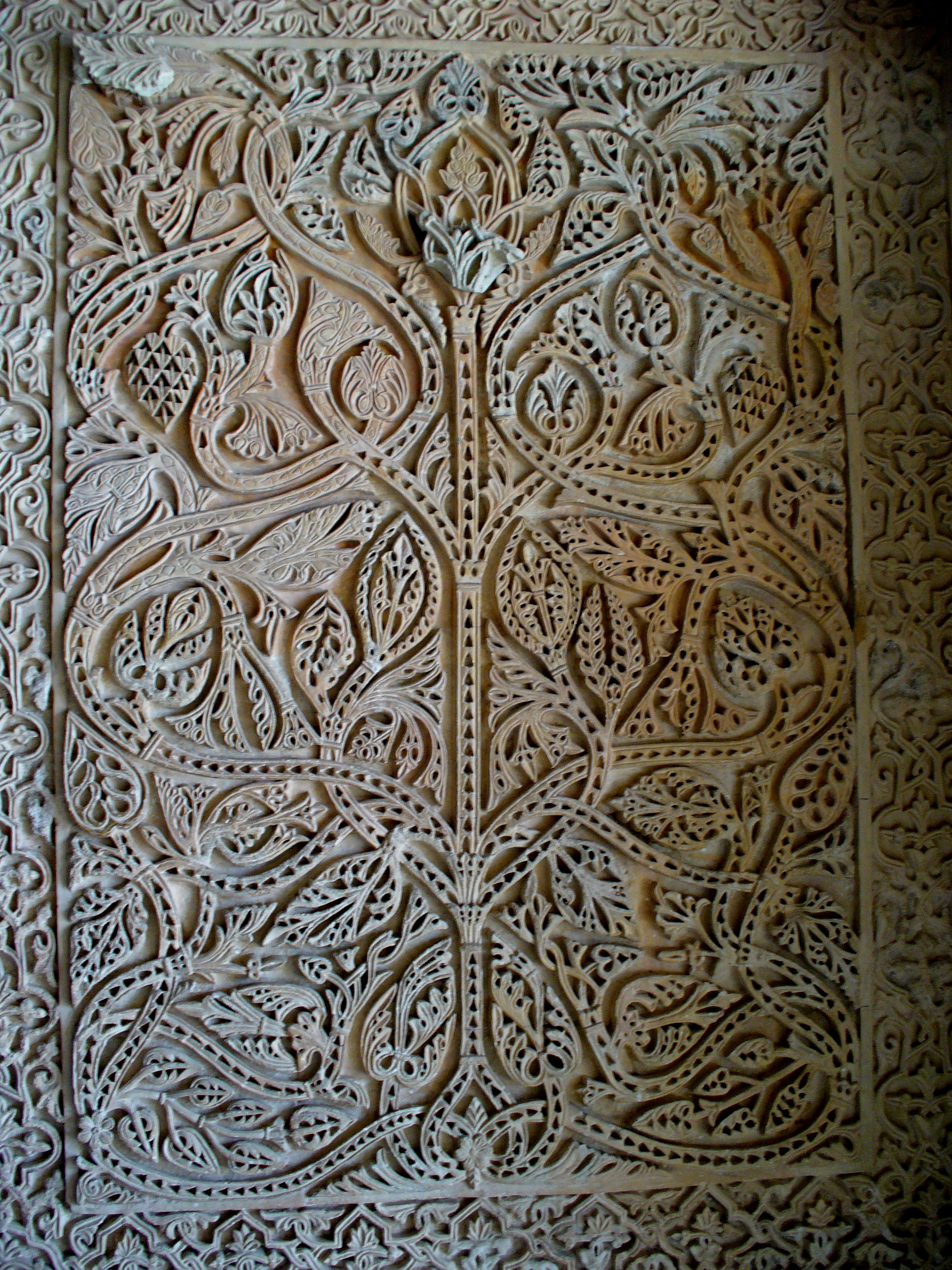
Arabesque panel from Medina Azahara, province of Córdoba

The extraordinary palace-city of Medina Azahara near Córdoba was built in the 10th century for the Umayyad Caliphs of Córdoba, intended as the capital of Islamic Andaluz, and is still being excavated. A considerable amount of the highly sophisticated decoration of the main buildings has survived, showing the enormous wealth of this very centralized state. The palace at Aljafería is later, from after Islamic Spain split into a number of kingdoms. Famous examples of Islamic architecture and its decoration are the Cathedral–Mosque of Córdoba, whose Islamic elements were added in stages between 784 and 987, and the Alhambra and Generalife palaces in Granada from the final periods of Muslim Spain.

The Pisa Griffin is the largest known Islamic sculpture of an animal, and the most spectacular of a group of such figures from Al-Andalus, many made to hold up the basins of fountains (as at the Alhambra), or in smaller cases as perfume-burners and the like.

The Christian population of Muslim Spain (the Mozarabs) developed a style of Mozarabic art whose best known survivals are a series of illuminated manuscripts, several of the commentaries on the Book of Revelation by the Asturian Saint Beatus of Liébana (c. 730 – c. 800), which gave subject matter that allowed the brightly coloured primitivist style full scope to demonstrate its qualities in manuscripts of the 10th century like the Morgan Beatus, probably the earliest, the Gerona Beatus (illuminated by a female artist Ende), Escorial Beatus and the Saint-Sever Beatus, which was actually produced some distance from Muslim rule in France. Mozarabic elements, including a background of brightly coloured strips, can be seen in some later Romanesque frescos.

Hispano-Moresque ware pottery began in the south, presumably mainly for local markets, but Muslim potters were later encouraged to migrate to the Valencia region, where the Christian lords marketed their luxury lustrewares to elites all over Christian Europe in the 14th and 15th centuries, including the Popes and the English court. Spanish Islamic ivory carving and textiles were also very fine; the continuing industries producing tiles and carpets in the peninsula owe their origins largely to the Islamic kingdoms.

After the expulsion of the Islamic rulers during the Reconquista, considerable Muslim populations, and Christian craftsmen trained in Muslim styles, remained in Spain, and Mudéjar is the term for work in art and architecture produced by such people. The Mudéjar Architecture of Aragon is recognised as a UNESCO World Heritage Site, and the 14th century Patio de las Doncellas built for Peter of Castile in the Alcázar of Seville is another outstanding example. The style could harmonize well with Christian European medieval and Renaissance styles, for example in elaborate wood and stucco ceilings, and Mudéjar work often continued to be produced for some centuries after an area passed to Christian rule.

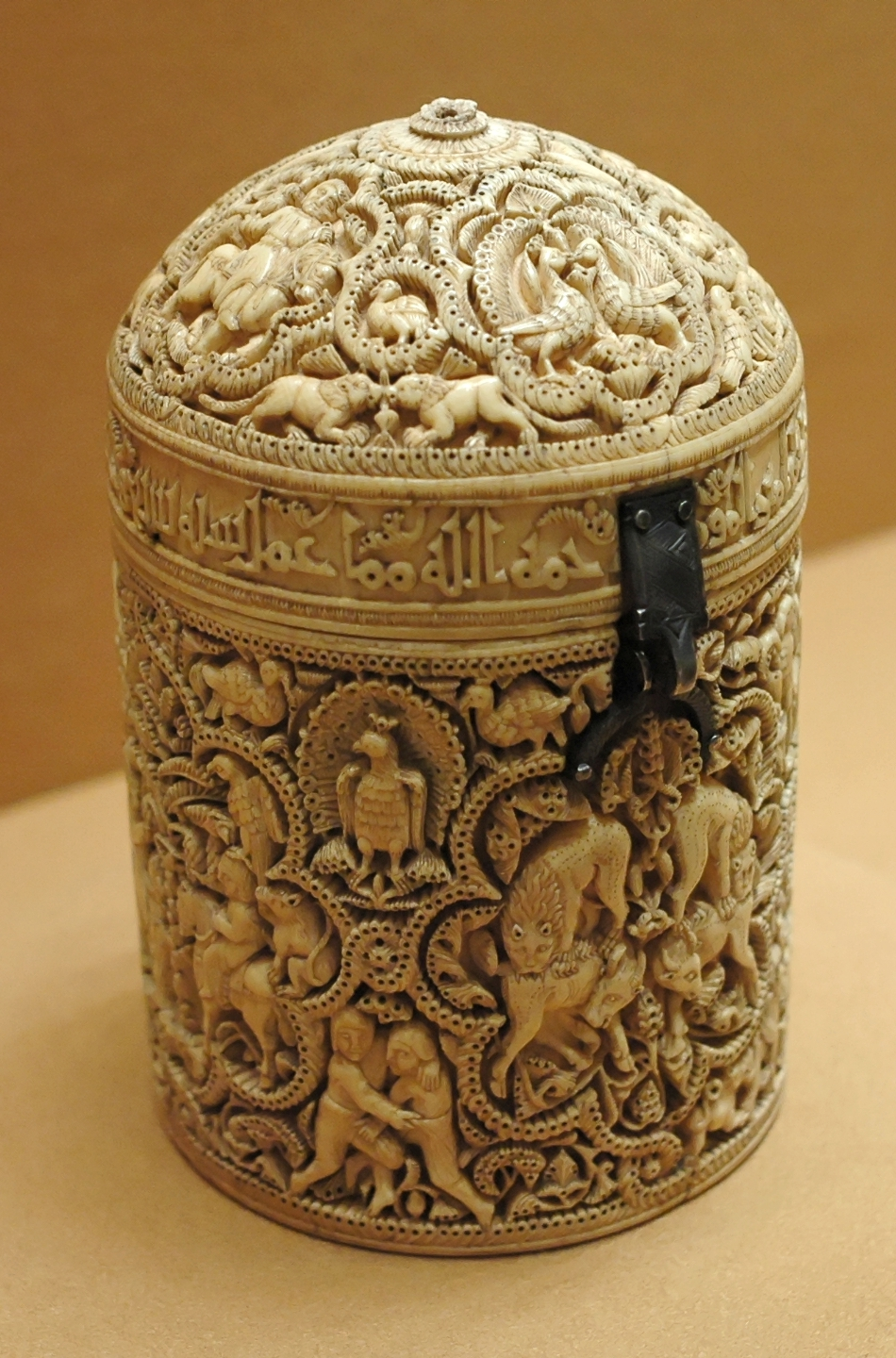
Ivory pyxis of al-Mughira, Medina Azahara, 968

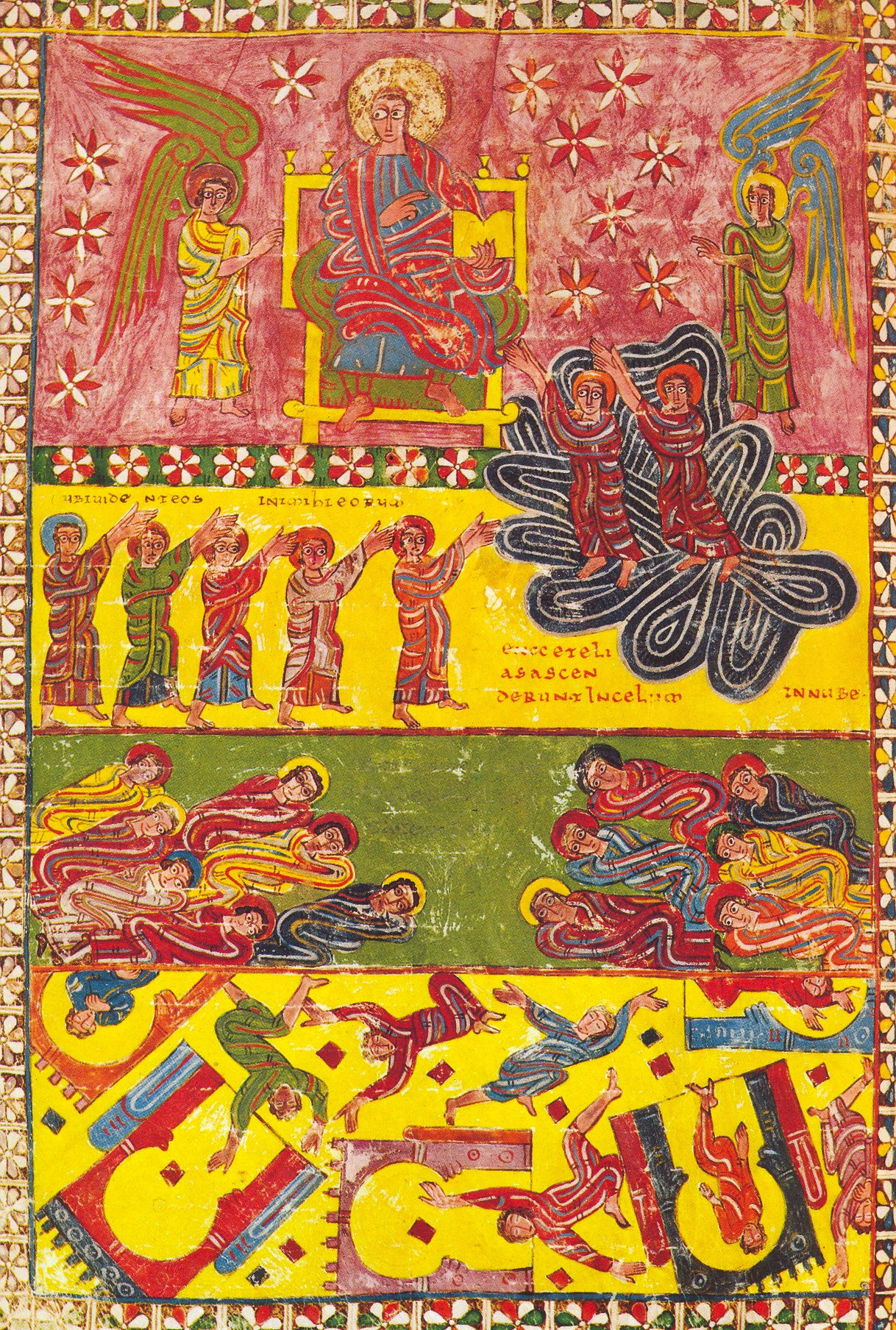
Page from the Morgan Beatus

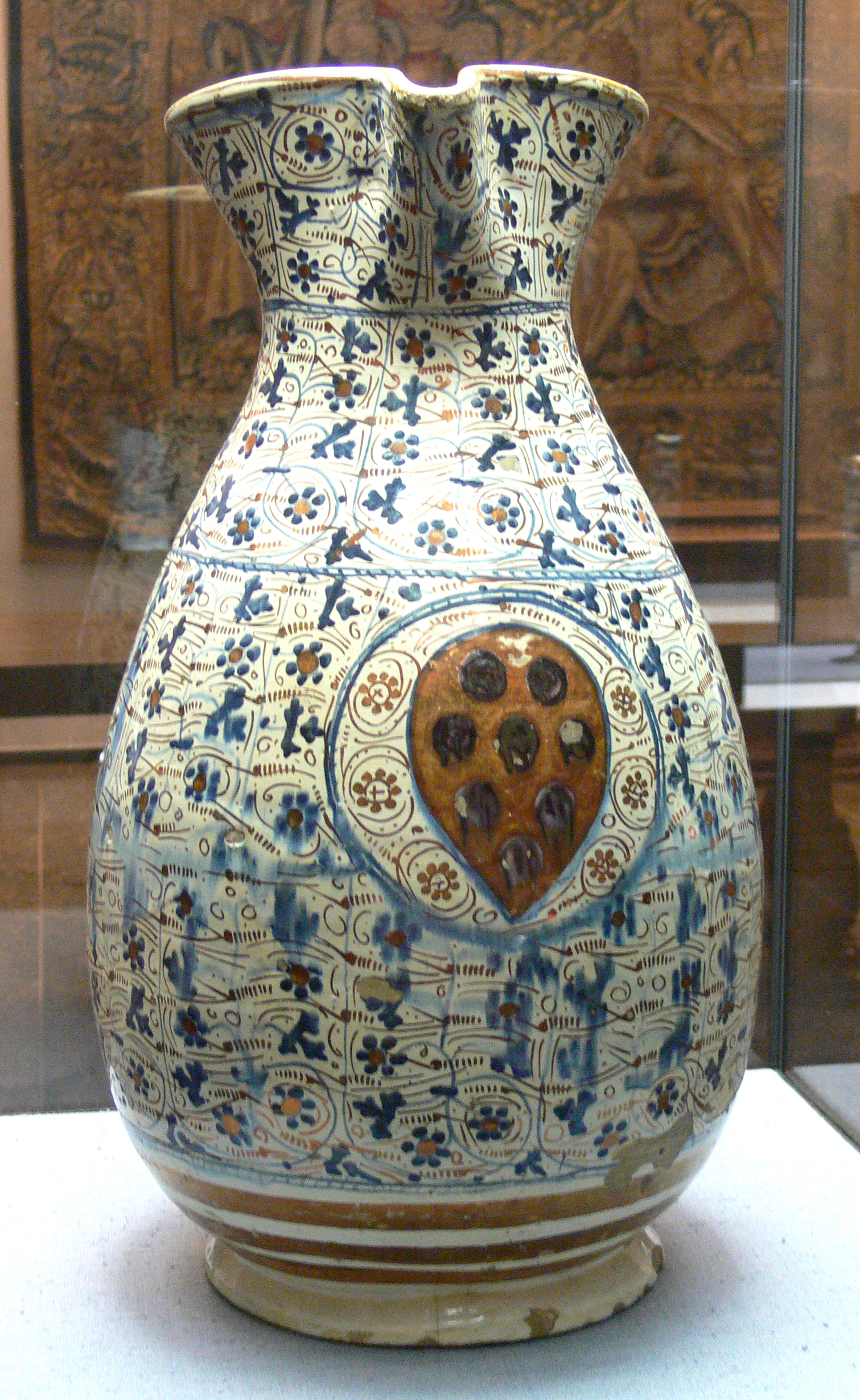
Hispano-Moresque ware jug with the Medici arms, 1450–1460

== Painting ==
=== Romanesque ===
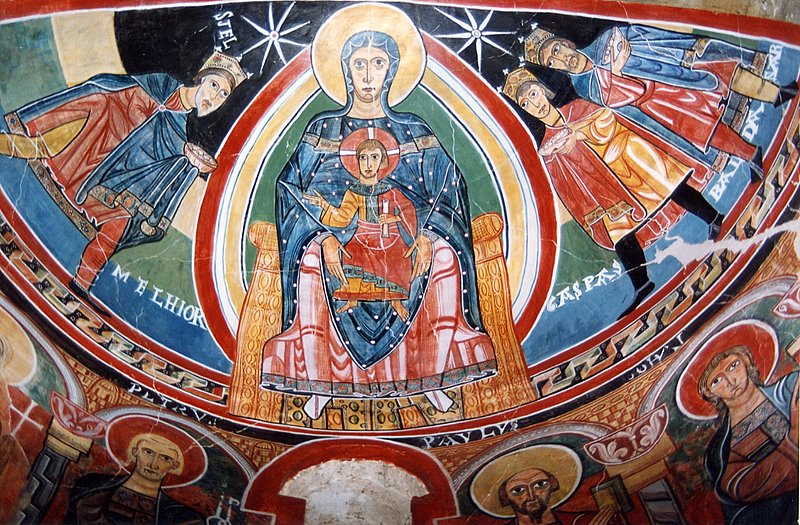
The apse of Santa Maria Taüll church, a Catalan fresco from Vall de Boí, province of Lleida, early 12th century. Now in the Museu Nacional d'Art de Catalunya.

In Spain, the art of the Romanesque period represented a smooth transition from the preceding Pre-Romanesque and Mozarabic styles. Many of the best surviving Romanesque church frescos that were at the time found all over Europe come from Catalonia with good examples in the churches of the Vall de Boí area; many of these were only uncovered during the 20th Century. Some of the best examples have been moved to museums, especially the Museu Nacional d’Art de Catalunya in Barcelona, which has the famous Central Apse from Sant Climent in Taüll and the frescos from Sigena. The finest examples of Castilian Romanesque frescoes are considered to be those in the San Isidoro in Leon, the paintings from San Baudelio de Berlanga, now mostly in various museums including the Metropolitan Museum of Art in New York, and those from Santa Cruz de Maderuelo in Segovia. There are also a number of altar frontals painted on wood and other early panel paintings.

=== Gothic ===
The Gothic art of Spain represented a gradual development from previous Romanesque styles, being led by external models, first from France, and then later from Italy. Another distinctive aspect was the incorporation of Mudejar elements. Eventually the Italian influence, which transmitted Byzantine stylistic techniques and iconography, entirely displaced the initial Franco-Gothic style Catalonia continued to be a prosperous area which has left many fine altarpieces; however the region went into decline after the emphasis of trade moved to the Atlantic after the American colonies opened up, which partly accounts for so many medieval survivals there, as there was not the money for Renaissance and Baroque renovations to churches.

=== Early Renaissance ===
Due to important economic and political links between Spain and Flanders from the mid-15th century onwards, the early Renaissance in Spain was heavily influenced by Netherlandish painting, leading to the identification of a Hispano-Flemish school of painters. Leading exponents included Fernando Gallego, Bartolomé Bermejo, Pedro Berruguete and Juan de Flandes.

=== Renaissance and Mannerism ===
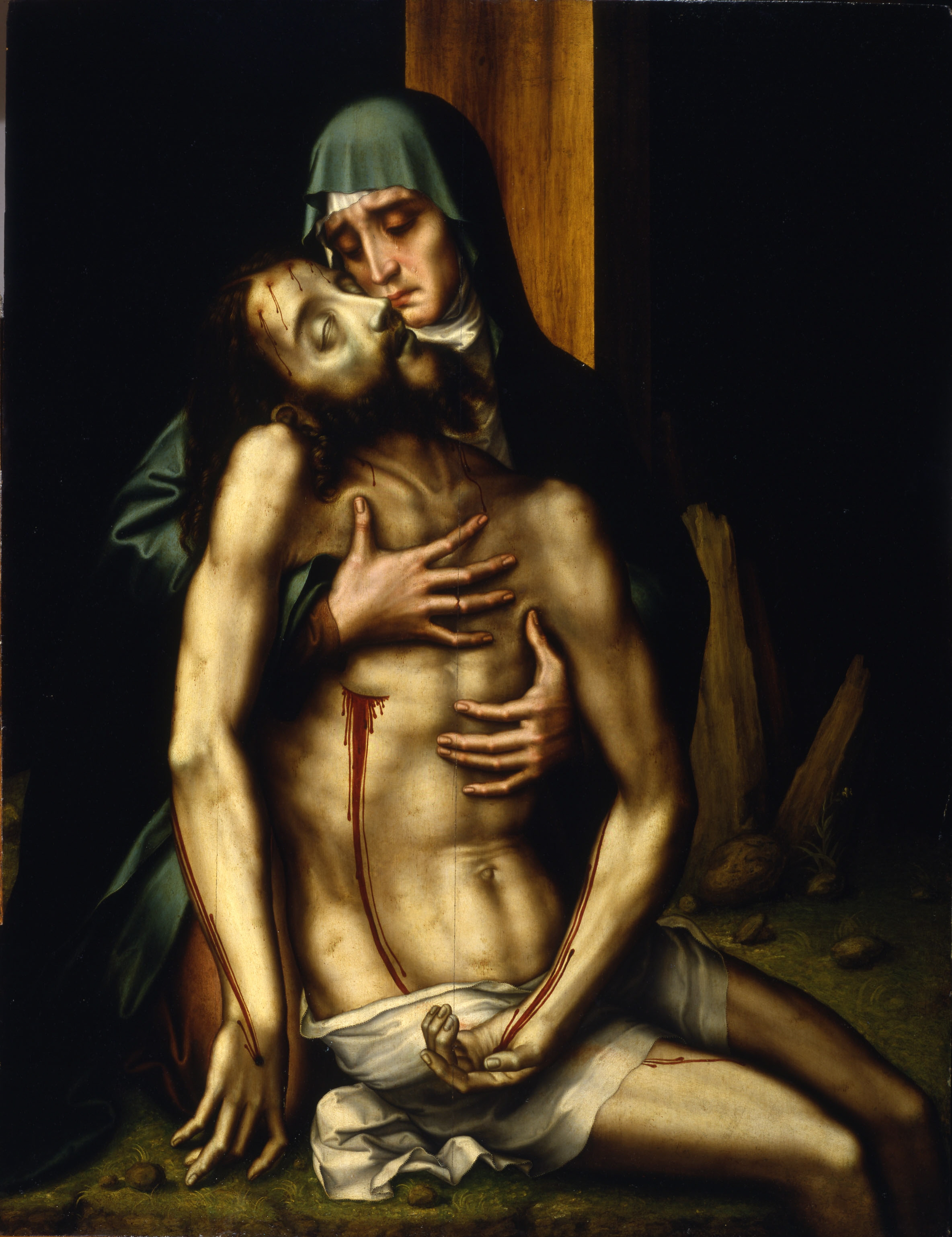
Pietà, by Luis de Morales. Real Academia de Bellas Artes de San Fernando, Seville.

Overall the Renaissance and subsequent Mannerist styles are hard to categorise in Spain, due to the mix of Flemish and Italian influences, and regional variations.

The main centre for Italian Renaissance influence entering Spain was Valencia due to its proximity and close links with Italy. This influence was felt via then import of artworks, including four paintings by Piombo and many prints by Raphael, the arrival of the Italian Renaissance artist Paolo de San Leocadio, and also by Spanish artists who spent time working and training there. Such artists included Fernando Yáñez de la Almedina (1475–1540) and Fernando Llanos, who displayed Leonadesque features in their works, such as delicate, melancholic expressions, and sfumato modelling of features.

Elsewhere in Spain, the influence of the Italian Renaissance was less pure, with a relatively superficial use of techniques that were combined with preceding Flemish practices and incorporated Mannerist features, due to the relatively late examples from Italy, once Italian art was already strongly Mannerist. Apart from technical aspects, the themes and spirit of the Renaissance were modified to the Spanish culture and religious environment. Consequently, very few classical subjects or female nudes were depicted, and the works frequently exhibited a sense of pious devotion and religious intensity – attributes that would remain dominant in much art of Counter Reformation Spain throughout the 17th century, and beyond. artists included Vicente Juan Masip (1475–1550) and his son Juan de Juanes (1510–1579), the painter and architect Pedro Machuca (1490–1550), and Juan Correa de Vivar (1510–1566). However, the most popular Spanish painter of the early 17th Century was Luis de Morales (1510?–1586), called by his contemporaries "The Divine", because of the religious intensity of his paintings. From the Renaissance he also frequently used sfumato modeling, and simple compositions, but combined them with Flemish style precision of details. His subjects included many devotional images, including the Virgin and Child.

=== Golden Age ===
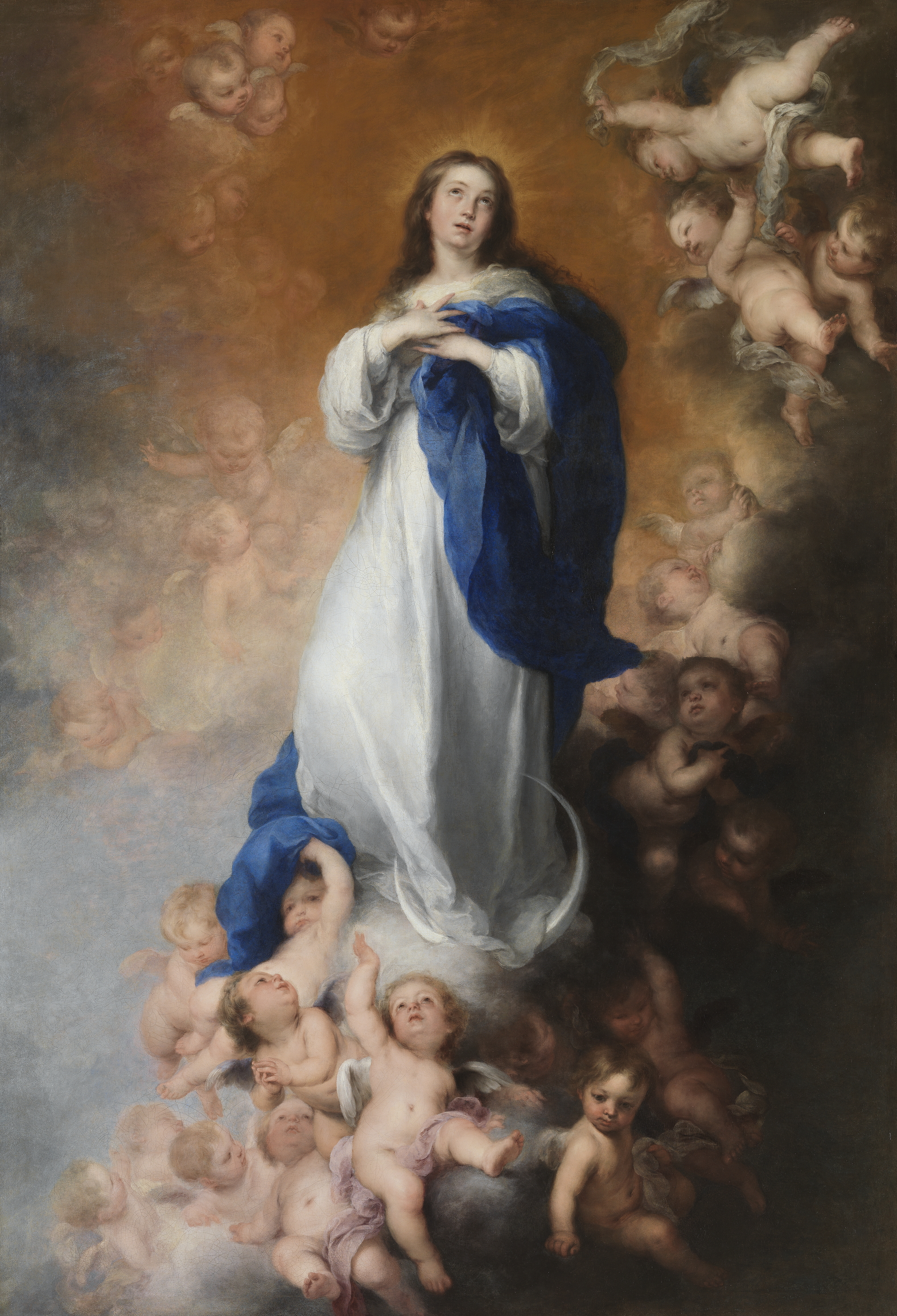
Bartolomé Esteban Murillo, Immaculate Conception of the Virgin (Soult). Museo del Prado.

The Spanish Golden Age, a period of Spanish political ascendancy and subsequent decline, saw a great development of art in Spain. The period is generally considered to have begun at some point after 1492 and ended by or with the Treaty of the Pyrenees in 1659, though in art the start is delayed until the reign of Philip III (1598–1621), or just before, and the end also delayed until the 1660s or later. The style thus forms a part of the wider Baroque period in art, although as well as considerable influence from great Baroque masters such as Caravaggio and later Rubens, the distinctive nature of the art of the period also included influences that modified typical Baroque characteristics. These included influence from contemporary Dutch Golden Age painting and the native Spanish tradition which give much of the art of the period an interest in naturalism, and an avoidance of the grandiosity of much Baroque art. Important early contributors included Juan Bautista Maíno (1569–1649), who brought a new naturalistic style into Spain, Francisco Ribalta (1565–1628), and the influential still life painter, Sánchez Cotán (1560–1627).

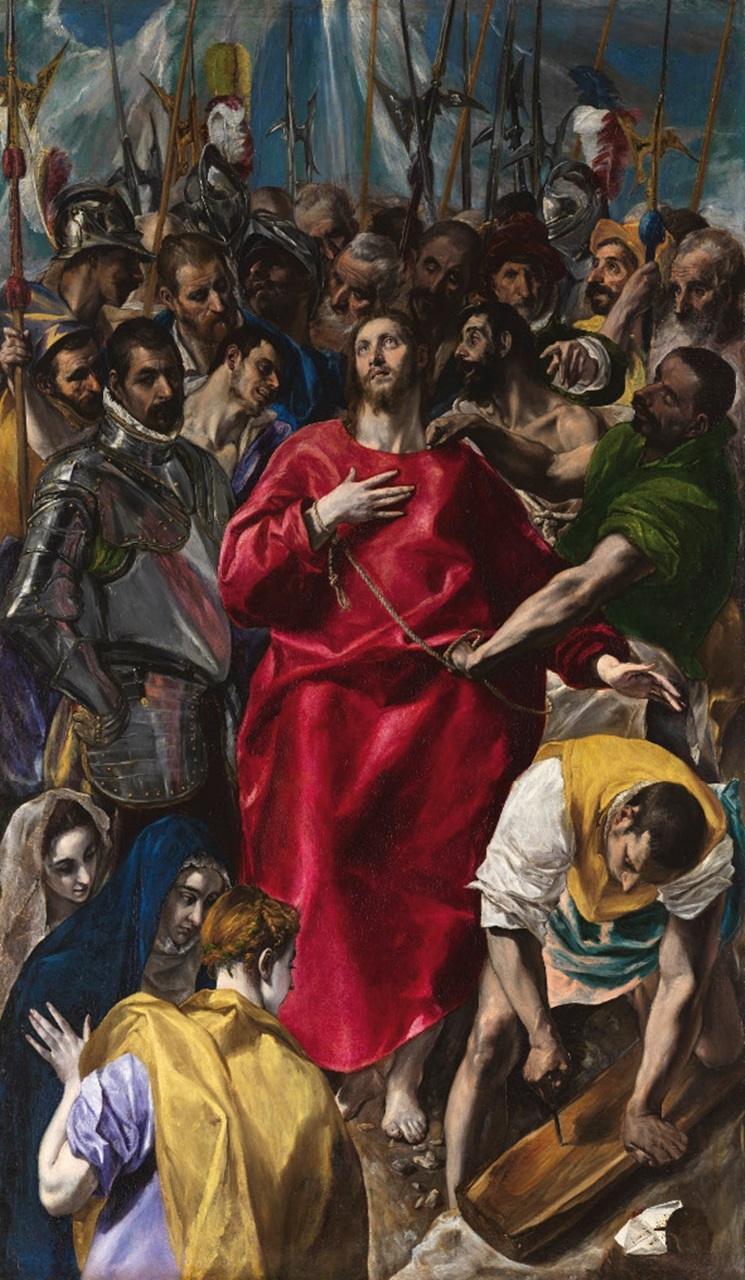
The Disrobing of Christ, El Greco, 1577–1579

El Greco (1541–1614) was one of the most individualistic of the painters of the period, developing a strongly Mannerist style based on his origins in the post Byzantine Cretan school, in contrast to the naturalist approaches then predominant in Seville, Madrid and elsewhere in Spain. Many of his works reflect the silvery-greys and strong colours of Venetian painters such as Titian, but combined with strange elongations of figures, unusual lighting, disposing of perspective space, and filling the surface with very visible and expressive brushwork.

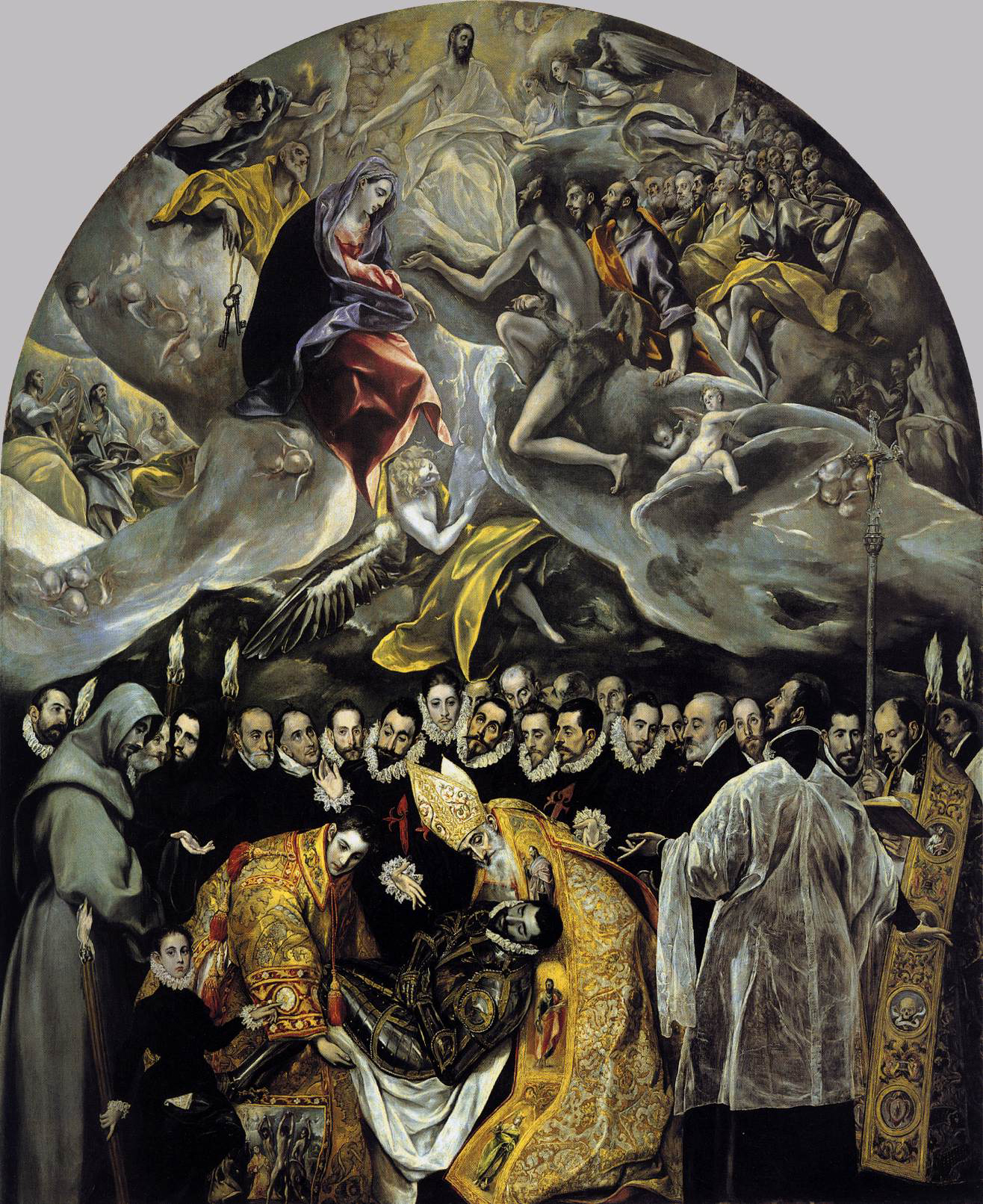
El Greco, The Burial of the Count of Orgaz, 1586. One of El Greco’s most celebrated works, it combines realism and mysticism to depict a legendary miracle in which Saints Augustine and Stephen descend to bury a local nobleman. Located in the Church of Santo Tomé, Toledo.

Although mostly active in Italy, particularly in Naples, José de Ribera (1591–1652) considered himself Spanish, and his style is sometimes used as an example of the extremes of Counter-Reformation Spanish art. His work was very influential (largely through the circulation of his drawing and prints throughout Europe) and developed significantly through his career.

Being the gateway to the New World, Seville became the cultural centre of Spain in the 16th Century, and attracted artists from across Europe, drawn by lure of commissions for the growing empire, and for the numerous religious houses of the wealthy city. Starting from a strongly Flemish tradition of detailed and smooth brushwork, as revealed in the works of Francisco Pacheco (1564–1644), over time a more naturalistic approach developed, with the influence of Juan de Roelas (c. 1560–1624) and Francisco Herrera the Elder (1590–1654). This more naturalistic approach, influenced by Caravaggio, became predominant in Seville, and formed the training background of three Golden Age masters: Cano, Zurbarán and Velázquez.

Francisco de Zurbarán (1598–1664) is known for the forceful, realistic use of chiaroscuro in his religious paintings and still lifes. Although seen as limited in his development, and struggling to handle complex scenes. Zurbarán's great ability to evoke religious feelings made him very successful in receiving commissions in conservative Counter-Reformation Seville.

Sharing the same painting master – Francisco Pacheco – as Velázquez, Alonso Cano (16601–1667) was also active in sculpture and architecture. His style moved from the naturalism of his early period, to a more delicate, idealistic approach, revealing Venetian and van Dyck influences.

=== Velázquez ===
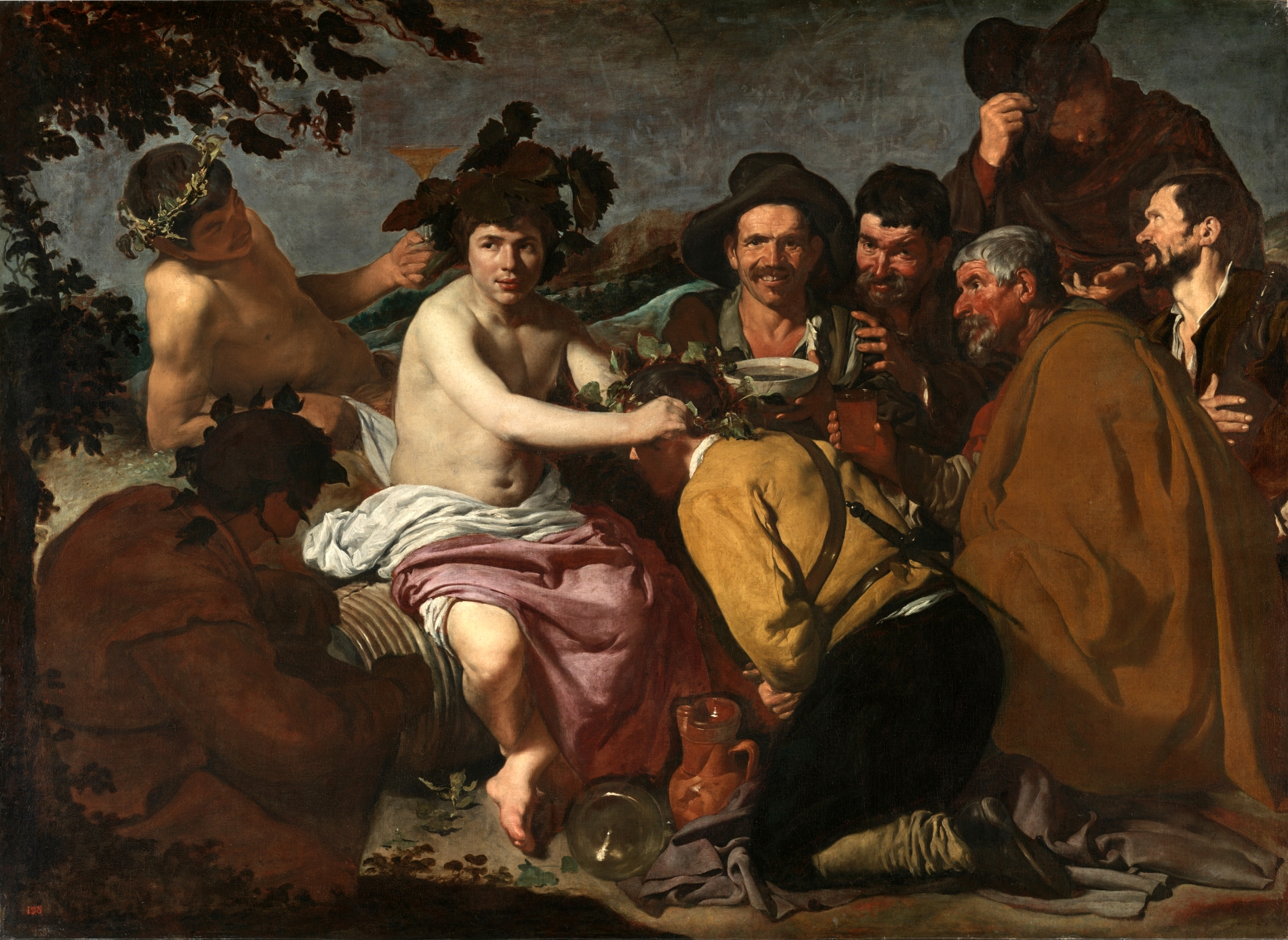
The Roman god Bacchus crowning a drunkard with a wreath, surrounded by peasants.

Diego Velázquez (1599–1660) was the leading artist in the court of King Philip IV. In addition to numerous renditions of scenes of historical and cultural significance, he created scores of portraits of the Spanish royal family, other notable European figures, and commoners. In many portraits, Velázquez gave a dignified quality to less fortunate members of society like beggars and dwarfs. In contrast to these portraits, the gods and goddesses of Velázquez tend to be portrayed as common people, without divine characteristics. Besides the forty portraits of Philip by Velázquez, he painted portraits of other members of the royal family, including princes, infantas (princesses), and queens.

=== Later Baroque ===
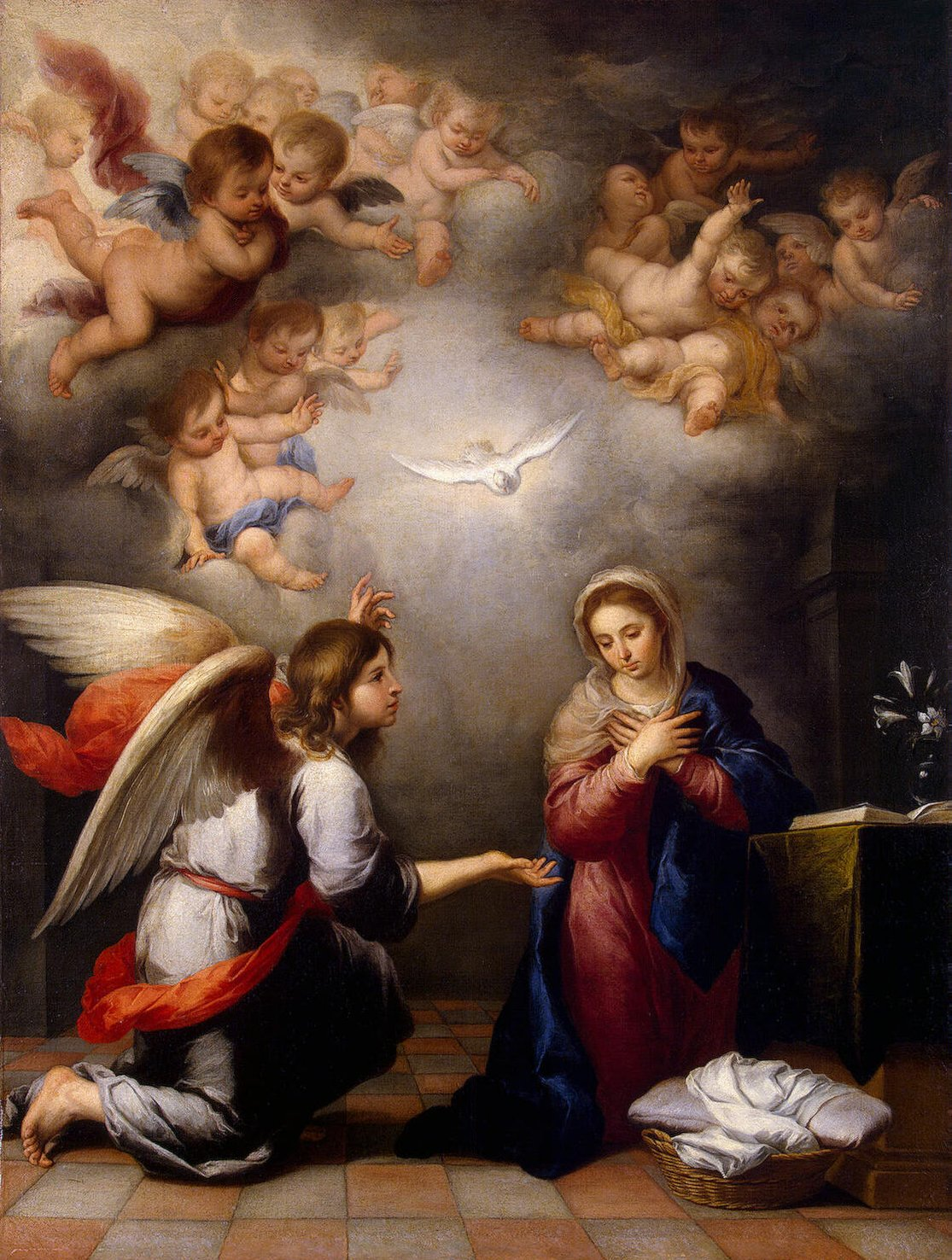
Bartolomé Esteban Murillo, Immaculate Conception of Los Venerables, c. 1678. One of Murillo’s finest Baroque works, blending Flemish influence with Spanish devotional imagery. Museo del Prado, Madrid.

Later Baroque elements were introduced as a foreign influence, through visits to Spain by Rubens, and the circulation of artists and patrons between Spain and the Spanish possessions of Naples and the Spanish Netherlands. Significant Spanish painters taking up the new style were Juan Carreño de Miranda (1614–1685), Francisco Rizi (1614–1685) and Francisco de Herrera the Younger (1627–1685), son of Francisco de Herrera the Elder an initiator of the naturalist emphasis of the Seville School. Other notable Baroque painters were Claudio Coello (1642–1693), Antonio de Pereda (1611–1678), Mateo Cerezo (1637–1666) and Juan de Valdés Leal (1622–1690).

The pre-eminent painter of the period – and most famous Spanish painter prior to the 19th century appreciation of Velázquez, Zurbarán and El Greco – was Bartolomé Esteban Murillo (1617–1682). Working for most of his career in Seville, his early work reflected the naturalism of Caravaggio, using a subdued, brown palette, simple but not harsh lighting, and religious themes that are portrayed in a natural or domestic setting, as in his Holy Family with a Little Bird (c. 1650). Later he incorporated elements of the Flemish Baroque from Rubens and Van Dyck. In the Soult Immaculate Conception, a brighter and more radiant colour range is used, the swirling cherubs bringing all the focus upon the Virgin, whose heavenward gaze and diffuse and warmly glowing halo make it an effective devotional image, an important component of his output; the Immaculate Conception of the Virgin theme alone was represented about twenty times by Murillo.

=== 18th century ===
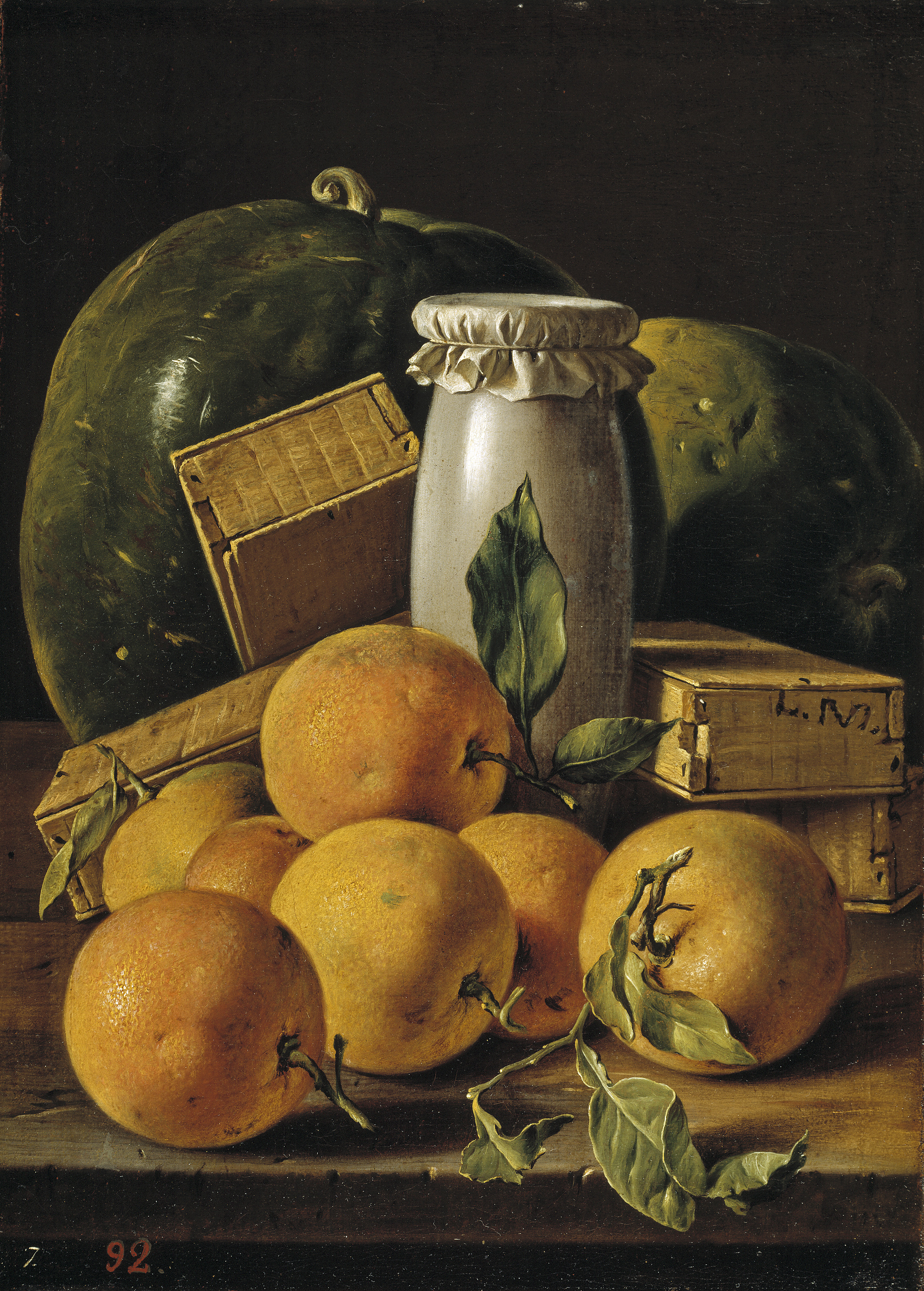
Still Life with Oranges Honey-Jar Boxes of Sweetmeats and Watermelons, by Luis Egidio Meléndez

The beginning of the Bourbon dynasty in Spain under Philip V led to great changes in art patronage, with the new French-oriented court favoring the styles and artists of Bourbon France. Few Spanish painters were employed by the court – a rare exception being Miguel Jacinto Meléndez (1679–1734) – and it took some time before Spanish painters adapted to the new Rococo and Neoclassical styles. Leading European painters, including Giovanni Battista Tiepolo and Anton Raphael Mengs, were active and influential.

Restricted from royal sponsorship, many Spanish painters continued the Baroque style in religious compositions. This was true of Francisco Bayeu y Subias (1734–1795), a skilled fresco painter, and of Mariano Salvador Maella (1739–1819) who both developed in the direction of the severe Neoclassicism of Mengs. Another important avenue for Spanish artists was portraiture, which was an active sphere for Antonio González Velázquez (1723–1794), Joaquín Inza (1736–1811) and Agustín Esteve (1753–1820). But it is in the genre of the still life that royal patronage was also successfully found, in the works by artists such as the court painter Bartolomé Montalvo (1769–1846) and Luis Egidio Meléndez (1716–1780).

Continuing in the Spanish still life tradition of Sánchez Cotán and Zurbarán, Meléndez produced a series of cabinet paintings, commissioned by the Prince of Asturias, the future King Charles IV, intended to show the full range of edible foods from Spain. Rather than being merely formal studies in Natural History, he used stark lighting, low viewpoints and severe compositions to dramatise the subjects. He showed great interest and attention to the details of reflections, textures and highlights (such the highlight on the patterned vase in Still Life with Oranges, Jars, and Boxes of Sweets) reflecting the new spirit of the age of Enlightenment.

==== Goya ====
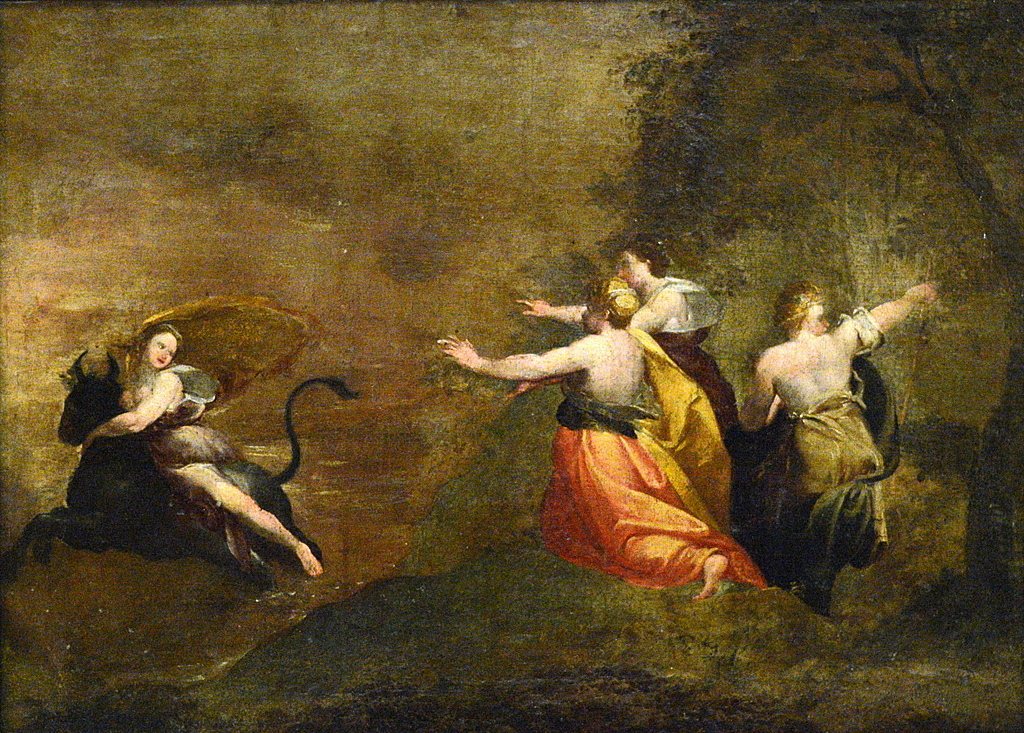
The rape of Europa (El rapto de Europa) by Goya

Francisco Goya was a portraitist and court painter to the Spanish Crown, a chronicler of history, and, in his unofficial work, a revolutionary and a visionary. Goya painted the Spanish royal family, including Charles IV of Spain and Ferdinand VII. His themes range from merry festivals for tapestry, draft cartoons, to scenes of war, fighting and corpses. In his early stage, he painted draft cartoons as templates for tapestries and focused on scenes from everyday life with vivid colors. During his lifetime, Goya also made several series of grabados, etchings which depicted the decadence of society and the horrors of war. His most famous painting series are the Black Paintings, painted at the end of his life. This series features works that are obscure in both color and meaning, producing uneasiness and shock.

He is considered the most important Spanish artist of late 18th and early 19th centuries and throughout his long career was a commentator and chronicler of his era. Immensely successful in his lifetime, Goya is often referred to as both the last of the Old Masters and the first of the moderns.

=== 19th century ===
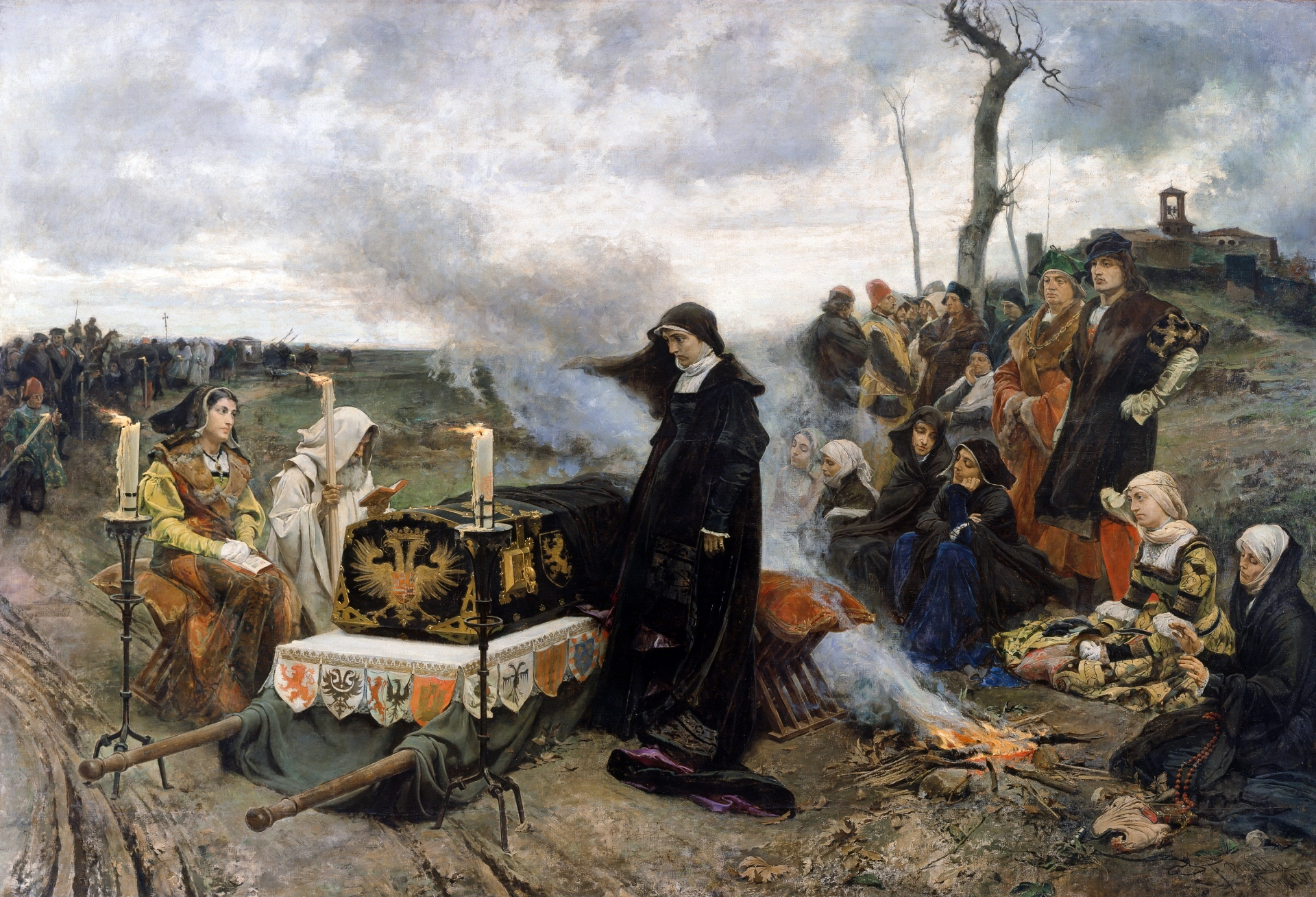
Frederico Pradilla, Doña Juana La Loca (Joan the Mad). Museo del Prado.

Various art movements of the 19th Century influenced Spanish artists, largely through them undertaking training in foreign capitals, particularly in Paris and Rome. In this way Neo-classicism, Romanticism, Realism and Impressionism became important strands. However, they were often delayed or transformed by local conditions, including repressive governments, and by the tragedies of the Carlist Wars. Portraits and historical subjects were popular, and the art of the past - particularly the styles and techniques of Velázquez - were significant.

Early years were still dominated by the academicism of Vincente López (1772–1850) and then the Neoclassicism of the French painter, Jacques-Louis David, as in the works by José de Madrazo (1781–1859), the founder of an influential line of artists and gallery directors. His son, Federico de Madrazo (1781–1859), was a leading figure in Spanish Romanticism, together with Leonardo Alenza (1807–1845), Valeriano Bécquer and Antonio María Esquivel.

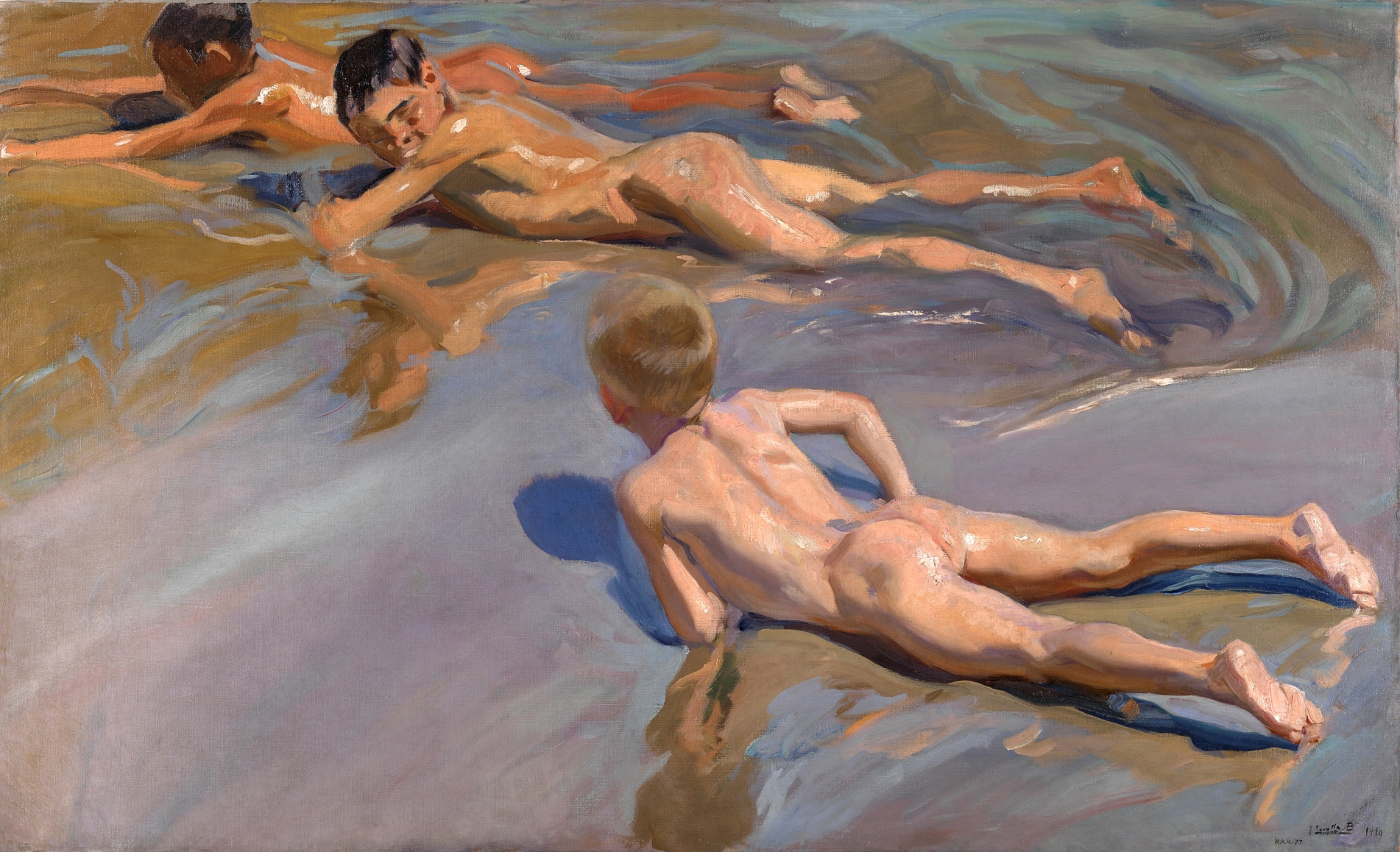
Joaquín Sorolla, Children on the beach, 1910, Prado

The later part of the century saw a strong period of Romanticism represented in history paintings, as in the works of Antonio Gisbert (1834–1901), Eduardo Rosales (1836–1873) and Francisco Pradilla (1848–1921). In these works the techniques of Realism were frequently used with Romantic subjects. This can clearly be seen in Joan the Mad, a famed early work by Pradilla. The composition, facial expressions, and stormy sky reflect the dramatic emotion of the scene; yet the precise clothing, the texture of the mud, and other details, show great realism in the artist's attitude and style. Mariano Fortuny(1838–1874) also developed a strong Realist style, after earlier being influenced by the French Romantic Eugène Delacroix, and became Spain's famous artist of the century

Joaquín Sorolla (1863–1923) excelled in the dexterous representation of the people and landscape under the sunlight of his native land, thus reflecting the spirit of Impressionism in many paintings, particularly his famous seaside paintings. In Children on the beach he makes the reflections, shadows and gloss of the water and skin his true subject. The composition is very daring, with the horizon omitted, one of the boys cut off, and strong diagonals leading to the contrasts and increased saturation of the upper-left of the work.

=== 20th century ===
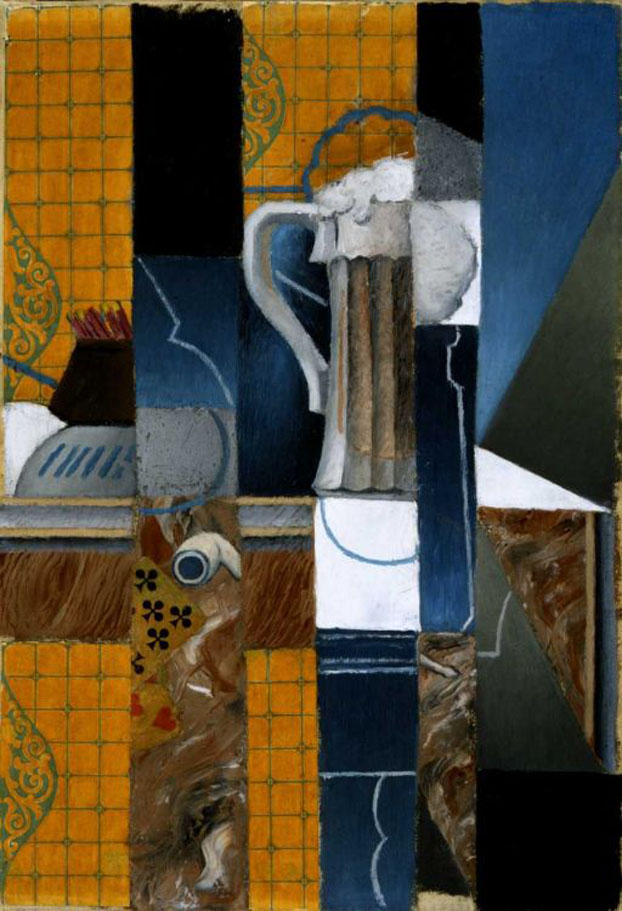
Juan Gris, Glass of Beer and Playing Cards, 1913, Columbus Museum of Art, Ohio

During the first half of 20th century many leading Spanish artists were working in Paris, where they contributed to – and sometimes led – developments in the Modernist art movement. As perhaps the most important example of this, Picasso, working together with the French artist Braque, created the concepts of Cubism; and the sub-movement of Synthetic Cubism has been judged to have found its purest expression in the paintings and collages of Madrid-born Juan Gris. In a similar way, Salvador Dalí became a central figure of the Surrealist movement in Paris; and Joan Miró was influential in abstract art.

Picasso's Blue Period (1901–1904), which consisted of somber, blue-tinted paintings was influenced by a trip through Spain. The Museu Picasso in Barcelona features many of Picasso's early works, created while he was living in Spain, as well as the extensive collection of Jaime Sabartés, Picasso's close friend from his Barcelona days who, for many years, was Picasso's personal secretary. There are many precise and detailed figure studies done in his youth under his father's tutelage, as well as rarely seen works from his old age that clearly demonstrate Picasso's firm grounding in classical techniques. Picasso presented the most durable homage to Velázquez in 1957 when he recreated Las Meninas in his characteristically cubist form. While Picasso was worried that if he copied Velázquez's painting, it would be seen only as a copy and not as any sort of unique representation, he proceeded to do so, and the enormous work—the largest he had produced since Guernica in 1937—earned a position of relevance in the Spanish canon of art. Málaga, Picasso's birthplace, houses two museums with significant collections, the Museo Picasso Málaga and Birthplace Museum.

Les Demoiselles d'Avignon (1907) by Pablo Picasso, considered the first major work of Cubism, this painting marks a turning point in 20th-century modern art and exemplifies the revolutionary contributions of Spanish artists in Paris.

Salvador Dalí was a central artist within the Surrealist movement in Paris. Although Dalí was criticized for accommodating Franco's regime, André Breton, the Surrealist leader and poet, asked him to represent Spain at the 1959 Homage to Surrealism Exhibition which celebrated the fortieth anniversary of Surrealism. In line with the Surrealist movement's objectives, Dalí stated that his artistic aim was that "the world of imagination and of concrete irrationality may be as objectively evident ... as that of the exterior world", and this goal can be seen in one of his most familiar paintings, The Persistence of Memory. Here he paints with a precise, realistic style, based on studies of Dutch and Spanish masters, but with a subject that dissolves the boundaries between organic and mechanical and is more akin to the nightmarish scenes of the Netherlandish painter Hieronymus Bosch, whose Garden of Earthly Delights provided the model for the central, sleeping figure of Dalí's work.

Joan Miró was also closely associated with the Surrealists in Paris, who particularly approved of his use of automatism in composition and execution, designed to expose the subconscious mind. Although his later and more popular paintings are refined, whimsical and apparently effortless, his influential period in the 1920s and 1930s produced works that were provocative in their sexual symbolism and imagery, and employing rough, experimental materials, including sandpaper, unsized canvases, and collage. In mature period painting, La Leçon de Ski, his characteristic language of signs, figures and black linear forms against more textured and painterly background is evident.

Ignacio Zuloaga and José Gutiérrez Solana were other significant painters of the first half of 20th century.

=== Post WW2 ===
In the post-War period, the Catalan artist Antoni Tàpies became famous for his abstract works, many of which use very thick textures and the incorporation of non-standard materials and objects. Tàpies has won several international awards for his works.

== Sculpture ==
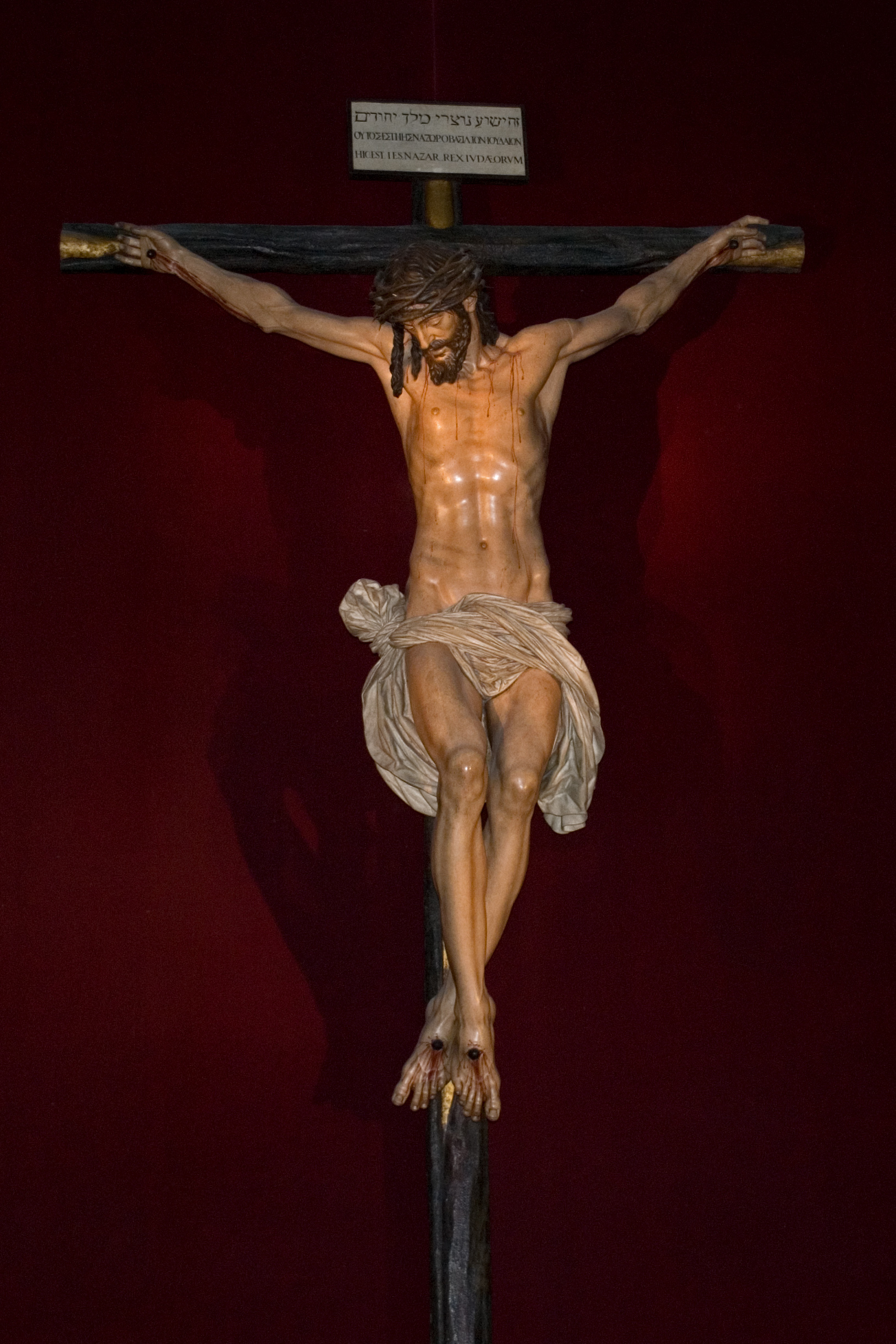
Cristo de la clemencia (Christ of Clemency) by Juan Martínez Montañés.

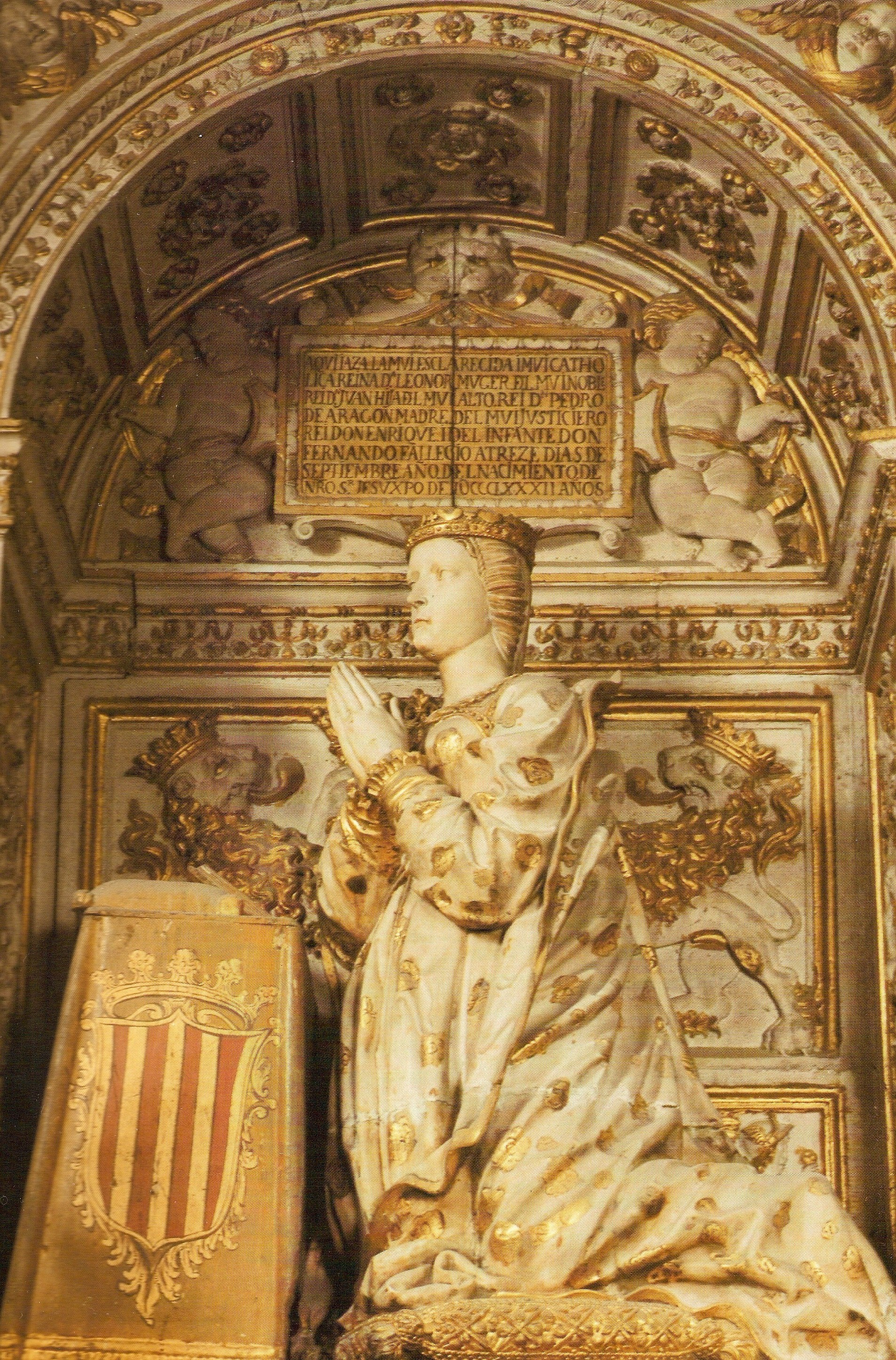
Sepulcher of Elanor of Aragon, in the Cathedral of Toledo.

The Plateresque style extended from beginnings of the 16th century until the last third of the century and its stylistic influence pervaded the works of all great Spanish artists of the time. Alonso Berruguete (sculptor, painter and architect) is called the "Prince of Spanish sculpture" because of the grandeur, originality, and expressiveness achieved in his works. His main works were the upper stalls of the choir of the Cathedral of Toledo, the tomb of Cardinal Tavera in the same Cathedral, and the altarpiece of the Visitation in the church of Santa Úrsula in the same locality.

Other notable sculptors were Bartolomé Ordóñez, Diego de Siloé, Juan de Juni and Damián Forment.

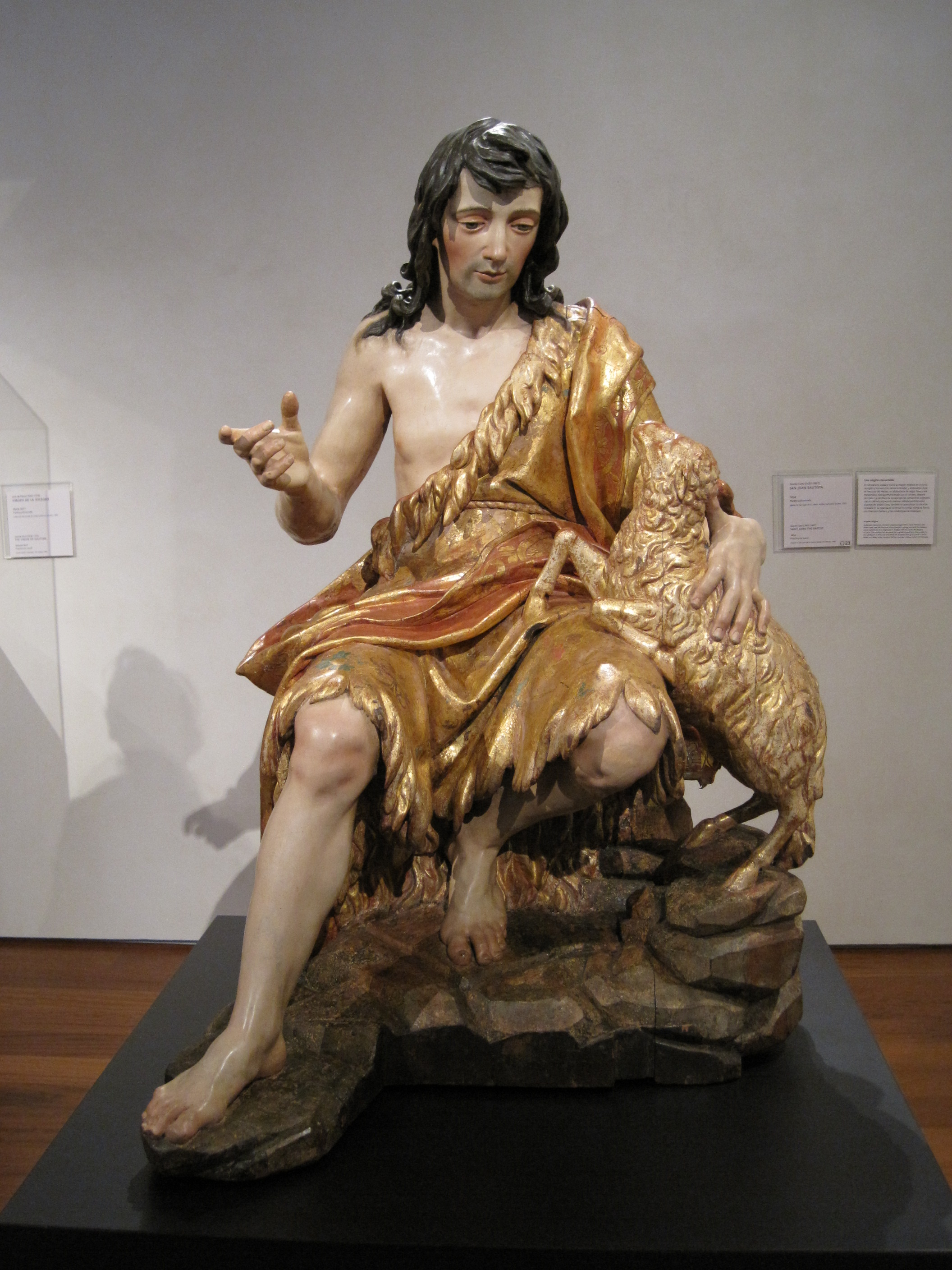
Saint John the Baptist, by Alonso Cano from the province of Valladolid. Now in the National Museum of Sculpture of Castile and León, Valladolid.

Another period of Spanish Renaissance sculpture, the Baroque, encompassed the last years of the 16th century and extended into the 17th century until reaching its final flowering the 18th, developing a truly Spanish school and style, of sculpture, more realistic, intimate and independently creative than that of the previous one which was tied to European trends, especially those of the Netherlands and Italy. There were two Schools of special flair and talent: the Seville School, to which Juan Martínez Montañés belonged (called the Sevillian Fidias), whose most celebrated works are the Crucifix in the Cathedral of Seville, another in Vergara, and a Saint John; and the Granada School, to which Alonso Cano belonged, to whom an Immaculate Conception and a Virgin of Rosary, are attributed.

Another notable Andalusian Baroque sculptors were Pedro de Mena, Pedro Roldán and his daughter Luisa Roldán, Juan de Mesa and Pedro Duque Cornejo.

The Valladolid school of the 17th century (Gregorio Fernández, Francisco del Rincón) was succeeded in the 18th century, although with less brilliance, by the Madrid School, and it was soon transformed into a purely academic style by the middle of the century. In turn, the Andalusian school was replaced by that of Murcia, epitomised in the person of Francisco Salzillo, during the first half of the century. This last sculptor is distinguished by the originality, fluidity, and dynamic treatment of his works, even in those representations of great tragedy. More than 1,800 works are attributed to him, the most famous products of his hand being the Holy Week floats (pasos) in Murcia, most notable amongst which are those of the Agony in the Garden and the Kiss of Judas.

In the 20th century the most important Spanish sculptors were Julio González, Pablo Gargallo, Eduardo Chillida and Pablo Serrano.

== Spanish collectors and museums of art ==
Hieronymus Bosch, The Garden of Earthly Delights, c. 1490–1510. A visionary triptych acquired by the Spanish royal collection, likely during the reign of Philip II, who displayed it in the monastery of El Escorial. Bosch was highly prized by Spanish monarchs, including Queen Isabel and Philip II, for his moral and religious symbolism. Today housed in the Museo del Prado, Madrid.

The Spanish royal collection was accumulated by Spanish monarchs beginning with Isabel the Catholic, Queen of Castile (1451–1504), who accumulated large and impressive collections of objets d'art, 370 tapestries, and 350 paintings, a number by important artists including Rogier van der Weyden, Hans Memling, Hieronymus Bosch, Juan de Flandes, and Sandro Botticelli. However many of these were dispersed by auction after her death in 1504. Isabel's grandson, Charles I, the first Habsburg king of Spain, was a patron and collector of art, as was his sister, Mary of Hungary. Both admired works by Titian. When the siblings died, the art passed to Philip II of Spain, Charles's son, an even keener collector. Philip IV (1605–1665) followed in the family tradition as a passionate art collector and patron. During his reign, Velázquez, Zurbarán and others produced many works of art. Philip commissioned works and purchased others, sending his representatives to acquire works for the monarch's collection. One of Philip IV's major contributions to art in Spain was to entail his collection, preventing their sale or other dispersal. Under the Spanish Bourbon monarch, Charles IV, the notion of bringing together major works from other repositories in Spain took shape, probably not for the public to view but for artists to study. The Prado Museum in Madrid became the main repository for that art.

The Royal Academy of Fine Arts of San Francisco, founded in 1744, now functions also as a museum in Madrid. The Museum of the Americas in Madrid has a collection of casta paintings and other art brought back to Spain from the Americas, as well as sculpture and archeological artifacts.

== Other artistic disciplines ==
- Architecture
- Cinematography
- Music
