= El Tiemblo =

- Municipality
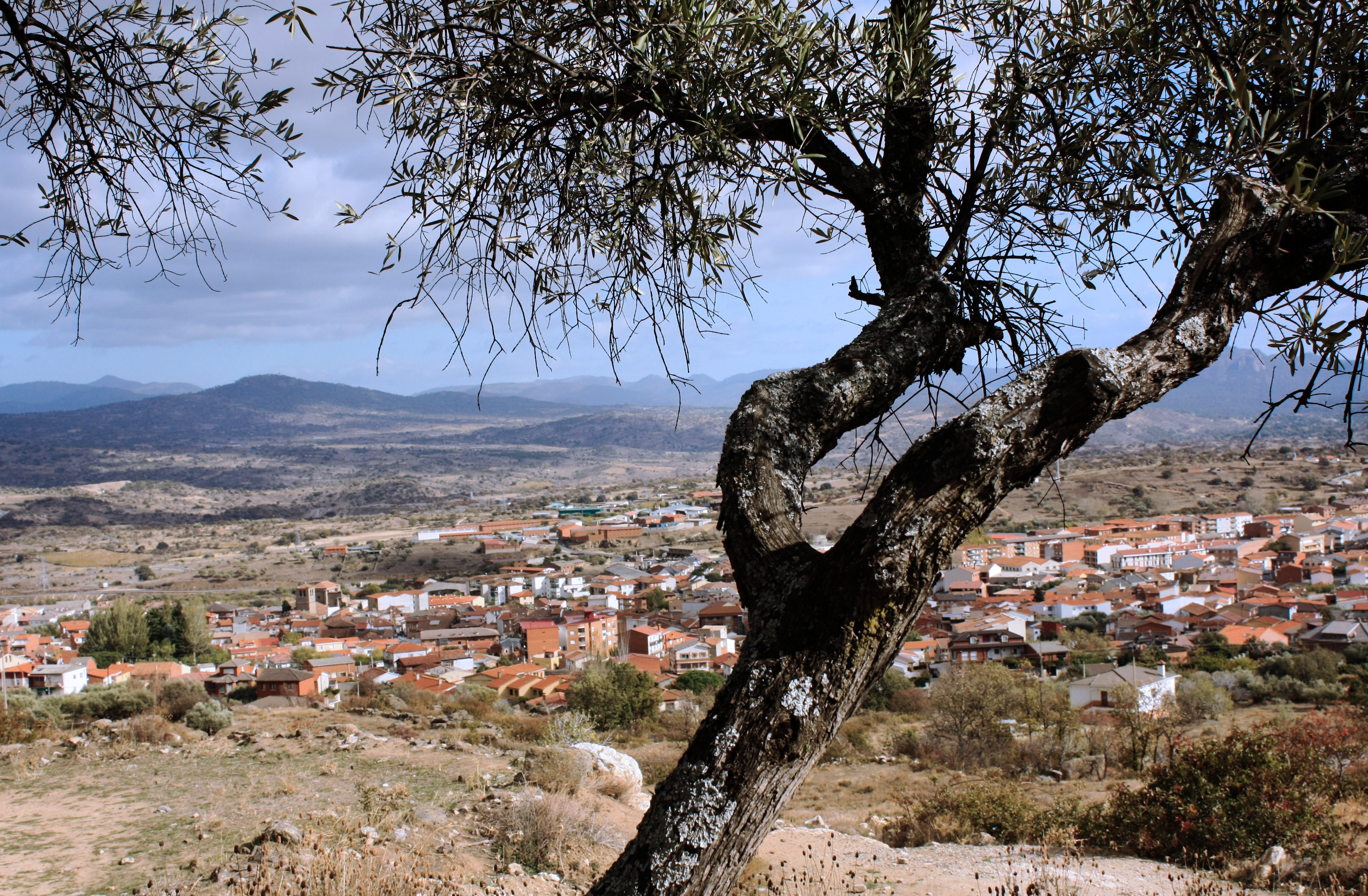
- El Tiemblo

- Flag Coat of arms

- Location in Spain. El Tiemblo (Spain)
- Coordinates: 40°24′51″N 4°30′00″W
- Country: Spain
- Autonomous community: Castile and León
- Province: Ávila
- Municipality: El Tiemblo

Area
  - Total: 75.59 km^{2} (29.19 sq mi)
- Elevation: 689 m (2,260 ft)

Population (2025-01-01)
  - Total: 4,582
  - Density: 60.62/km^{2} (157.0/sq mi)
- Time zone: UTC+1 (CET)
  - Summer (DST): UTC+2 (CEST)
- Website: Official website

El Tiemblo is a municipality located in the province of Ávila, Castile and León, Spain. The municipality covers an area of about 75 km^{2}.

== Location ==
El Tiemblo is located in the valley of the river Alberche, between the reservoirs of El Burguillo and of San Juan, next to the smaller reservoir of El Charco del Cura. The neighbouring municipalities are El Barraco, Cebreros, San Martin de Valdeiglesias, Casillas and Navahondilla.

El Tiemblo is on the southern slopes of the Sierra de Gredos mountain range. To the southeast is the Alto del Mirlo peak at 1,725 m above sea level; La Parra at 1,637 m, La Encinilla at 1,604 m.

Part of the territory of the municipality of El Tiemblo forms part of the Valle de Iruelas Natural Park, which is home to a large colony of black vultures (Aegypius monachus).

Inside this natural park is the Castañar de El Tiemblo, a chestnut tree forest that contains trees that are several centuries old. The oldest one is known as El Abuelo (the grandfather) and is said to be over 500 years old.

Apart from El Tiemblo itself, there are four other villages or hamlets in the municipality: La Atalaya, Cerro guisando, Poblado de El Burguillo and Puente Nuevo.

== Population ==
Historical population
Year	Pop.	±% p.a.
2023	4,445	—
2024	4,526	+1.82%
2025	4,582	+1.24%
Source: INE

== Climate ==
El Tiemblo has a Mediterranean climate (temperate with hot dry summers) according to the Köppen classification.

== Educational facilities ==
=== Public schools ===
- Kindergarten - Tomatitos, from 0 to 3 years of age.
- Primary school - CEIP Toros de Gusando
- Secondary school - IES Claudio Sánchez Albornoz
- Adult education centre

=== Private religious school ===
“Santisima Trinidad” (kindergarten, primary and secondary)

== Architectural heritage ==
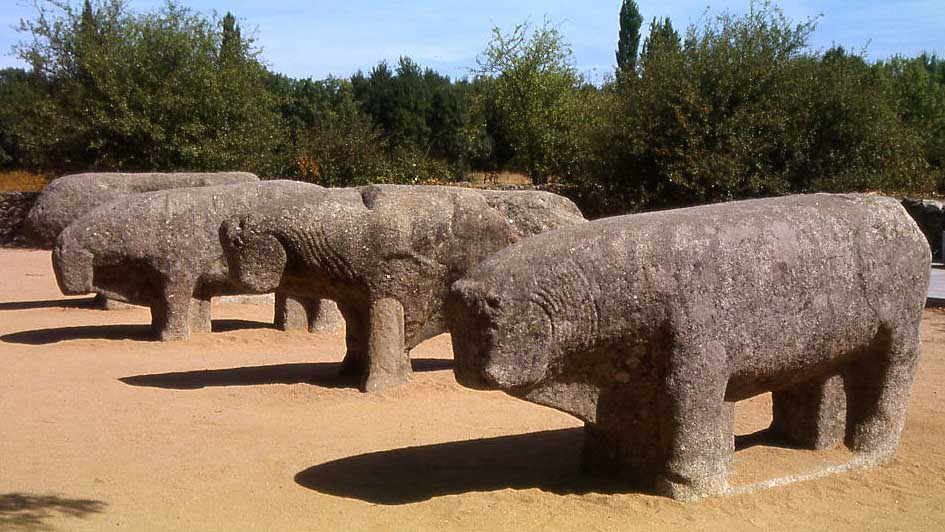
The Bulls of Guisando, created in the 2nd century BC (in the Iron Age)

- The Toros de Guisando. Four stone Iron Age bulls. See main article.
- The Monasterio de los Jerónimos. Also known as the Monasterio de Cerro Guisando, built in the 14th century. It burned down in 1979 and has not been repaired.
- The parish church of Nuestra Señora de la Asunción. Built over several periods between the 15th and 17th centuries.
- Hermitage of San Antonio, the patron saint of El Tiemblo.
- Town Hall, built in the 18th century in the neoclassic style. Restored in 2000.

== Gallery ==
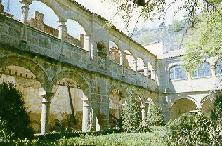
Monasterio de los Jerónimos

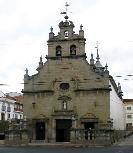
Hermitage of San Antonio

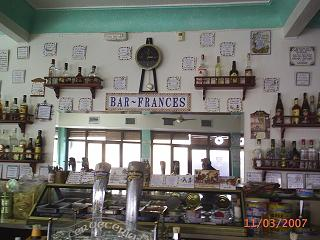
Bar Francés. Historic bar, symbol of this town.

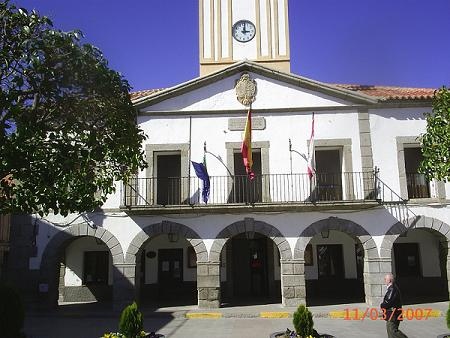
Town Hall
