= El Charco del Cura Reservoir =

Reservoir in El Tiemblo, Avila, Spain

Coordinates: 40.425°N 4.510°W

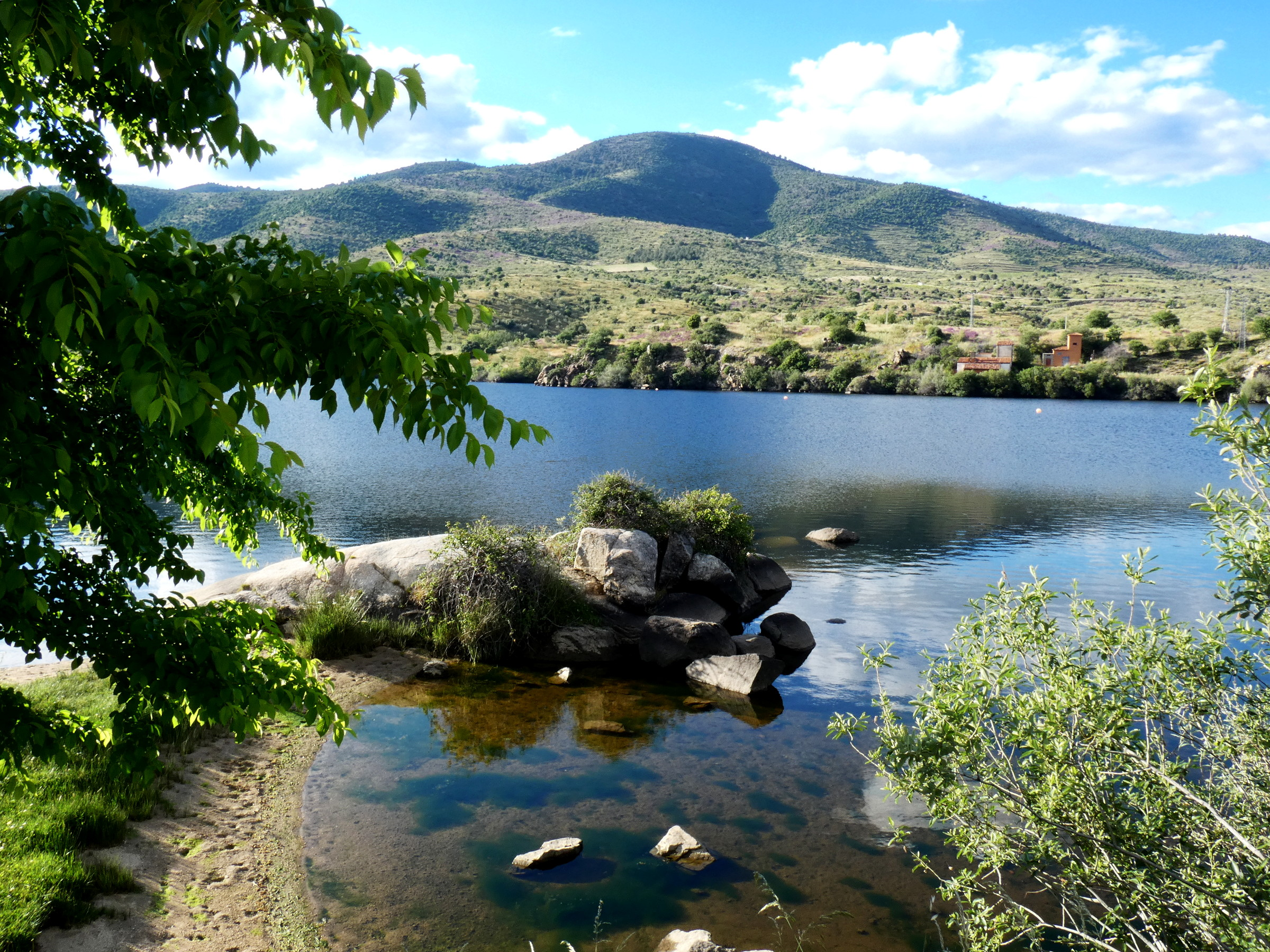
- del Charco del Cura Reservoir in El Tiemblo, Avila

- Location within Province of Ávila Location within Spain
- Interactive map of El Charco del Cura Reservoir
- Location: El Tiemblo, Ávila
- Type: Reservoir
- Part of: Tagus Basin
- River sources: Alberche
- Primary outflows: El Burguillo Reservoir
- Basin countries: Spain
- Managing agency: Confederación Hidrográfica del Tajo
- Built: 1931
- Construction engineer: E. Becerril and A. Peralba
- Surface area: 34 hectares (84 acres)
- Water volume: 3 hm^{3} (110,000,000 cu ft)

The El Charco del Cura reservoir is located along the Alberche river in the municipality of El Tiemblo, Ávila, Spain. It is managed by the Confederación Hidrográfica del Tajo.

It was built in 1931 and was designed by E. Becerril and A. Peralba. It covers a surface area of 34 hectares (84 acres) and has a capacity of 3 hm^{3} (110,000,000 cu ft).
