= Bulls of Guisando =

Coordinates: 40°21′41.7″N 4°26′30.56″W

- Toros de Guisando (Spanish)
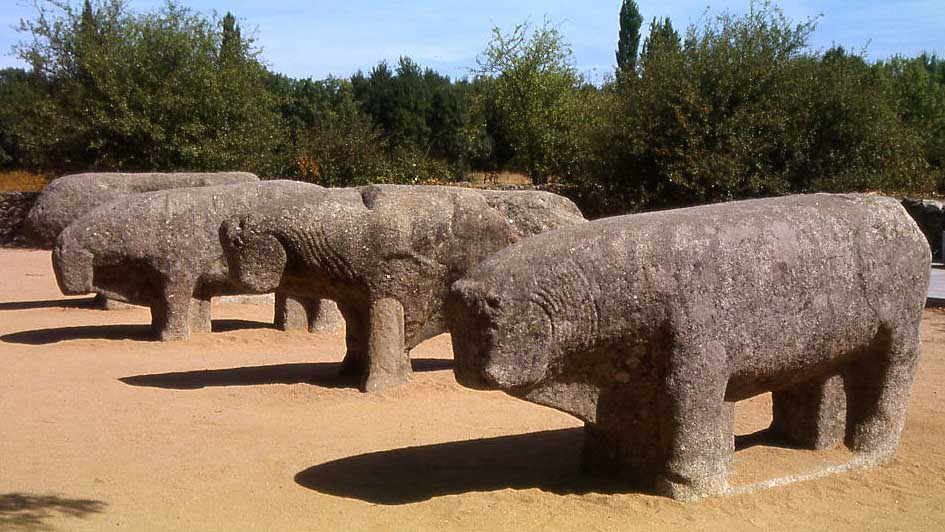
- The Bulls of Guisando
- Interactive map of Bulls of Guisando
- Location: El Tiemblo (Ávila), Spain

Spanish Cultural Heritage
- Type: Non-movable
- Criteria: Historic site
- Designated: 5 February 1954
- Reference no.: RI-54-0000010

The Bulls of Guisando (Spanish: Toros de Guisando) are a set of ancient sculptures located on the hill of Guisando in the municipality of El Tiemblo, Ávila, Spain. The four sculptures, made of granite, represent quadrupeds identified as bulls or pigs. The balance of opinion favours bulls: there are holes which have been interpreted as sockets for horns.

The Bulls of Guisando are examples of a type of ancient sculpture called verracos of which hundreds are known. They are associated with the territory of the pre-Roman peoples known as the Vettones. The Bulls may have been made during the 2nd century BCE. Whether they are in their original position is debatable. There are some Latin graffiti on them which may mean they were repositioned in Roman times.

The field around the Bulls was the place where the Treaty of the Bulls of Guisando was signed between Henry IV of Castile and his half-sister Isabella of Castile on September 18, 1468, which granted her the title of Princess of Asturias thus ending a civil war in Castile.

The Bulls are also a recurrent feature in Spanish literature. For instance, Miguel de Cervantes references them several times throughout his novel Don Quixote. Federico García Lorca uses their symbolic value in his Llanto por la muerte de Ignacio Sánchez Mejías:

...y los toros de Guisando,
casi muerte y casi piedra,
mugieron como dos siglos
hartos de pisar la tierra

...and the bulls of Guisando
partly death and partly stone
bellowed like two centuries
tired of treading the earth

The bulls are protected in Spain's heritage listings as a Bien de Interés Cultural (Property of Cultural Interest), being classified as a Sitio histórico or historic site.
