= Navahondilla =

- municipality
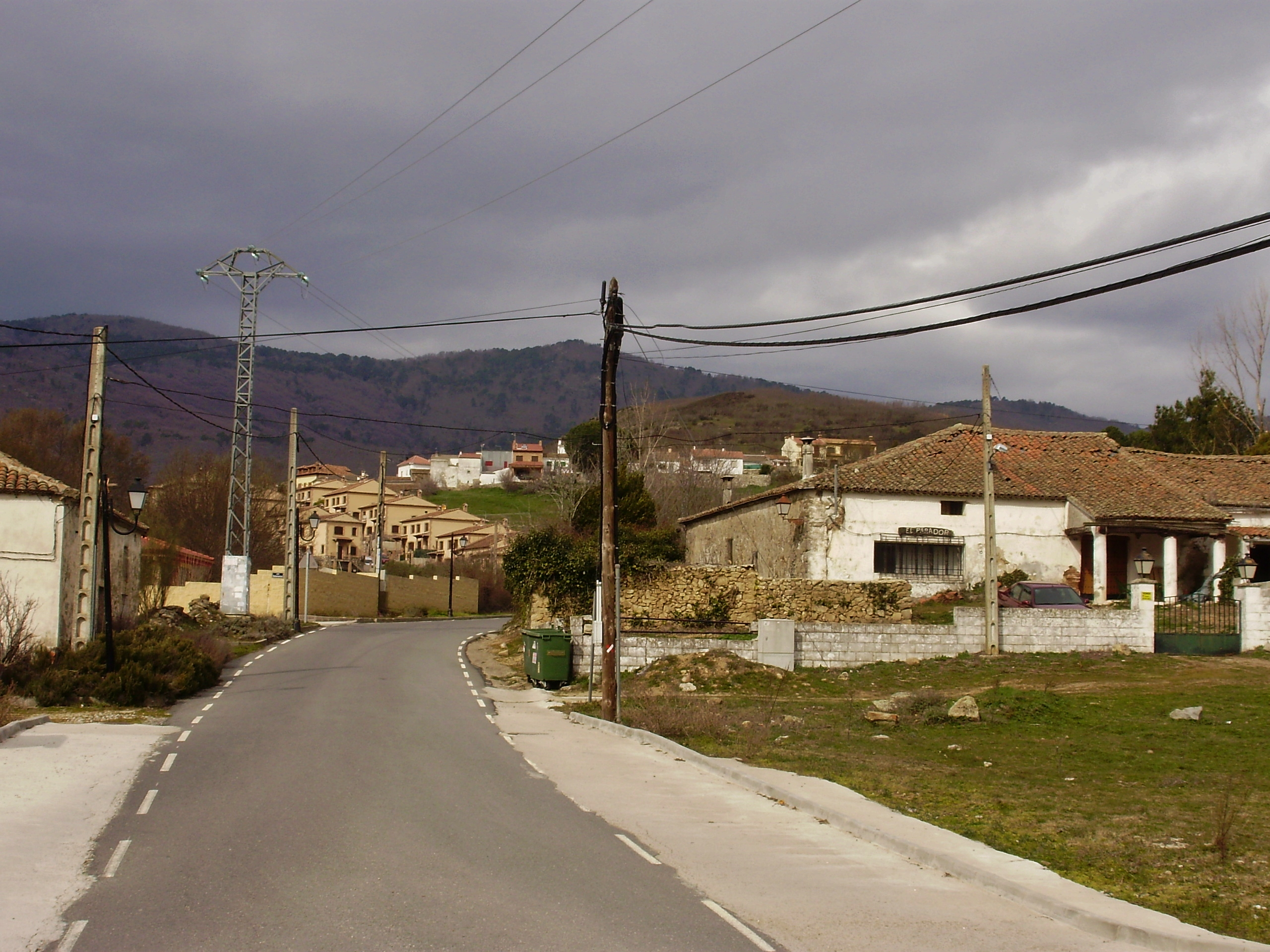
- View of the Town of Navahondilla

- Flag Coat of arms

- Location in Spain. Navahondilla (Spain)
- Coordinates: 40°19′31″N 4°29′40″W
- Country: Spain
- Autonomous community: Castile and León
- Province: Ávila
- Municipality: Navahondilla

Area
  - Total: 2,207 km^{2} (852 sq mi)
- Elevation: 741 m (2,431 ft)

Population (2025-01-01)
  - Total: 359
  - Density: 15.5/km^{2} (40/sq mi)
- Time zone: UTC+1 (CET)
  - Summer (DST): UTC+2 (CEST)
- Website: Official website

Navahondilla is a municipality located in the province of Ávila, Castile and León, Spain.

== Population ==
Historical population
Year	Pop.	±% p.a.
2023	358	—
2024	353	−1.40%
2025	359	+1.70%
Source: INE
