= Las Navas del Marqués =

- Municipality
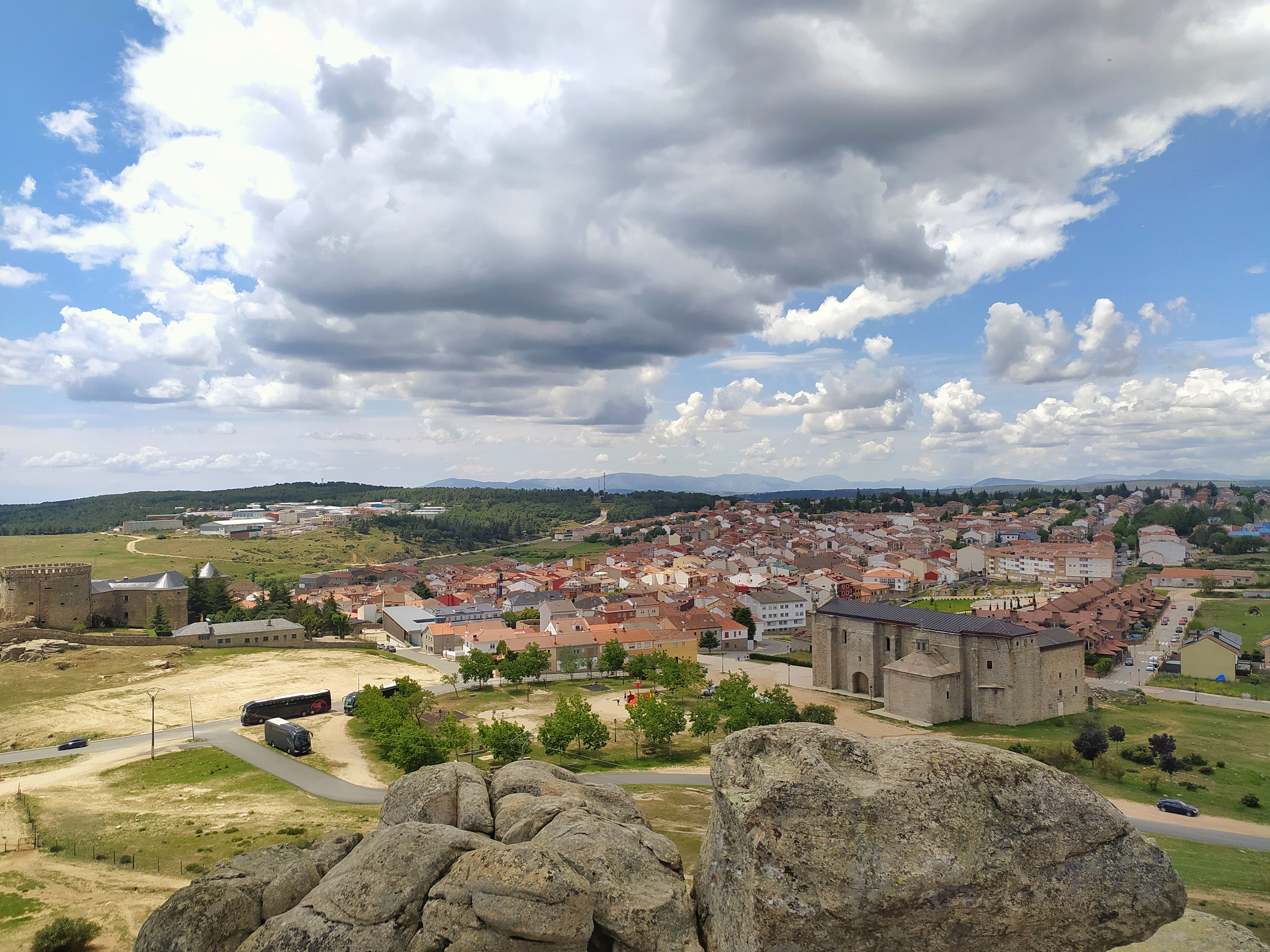
- View from the Risco de Santa Ana

- Flag Coat of arms

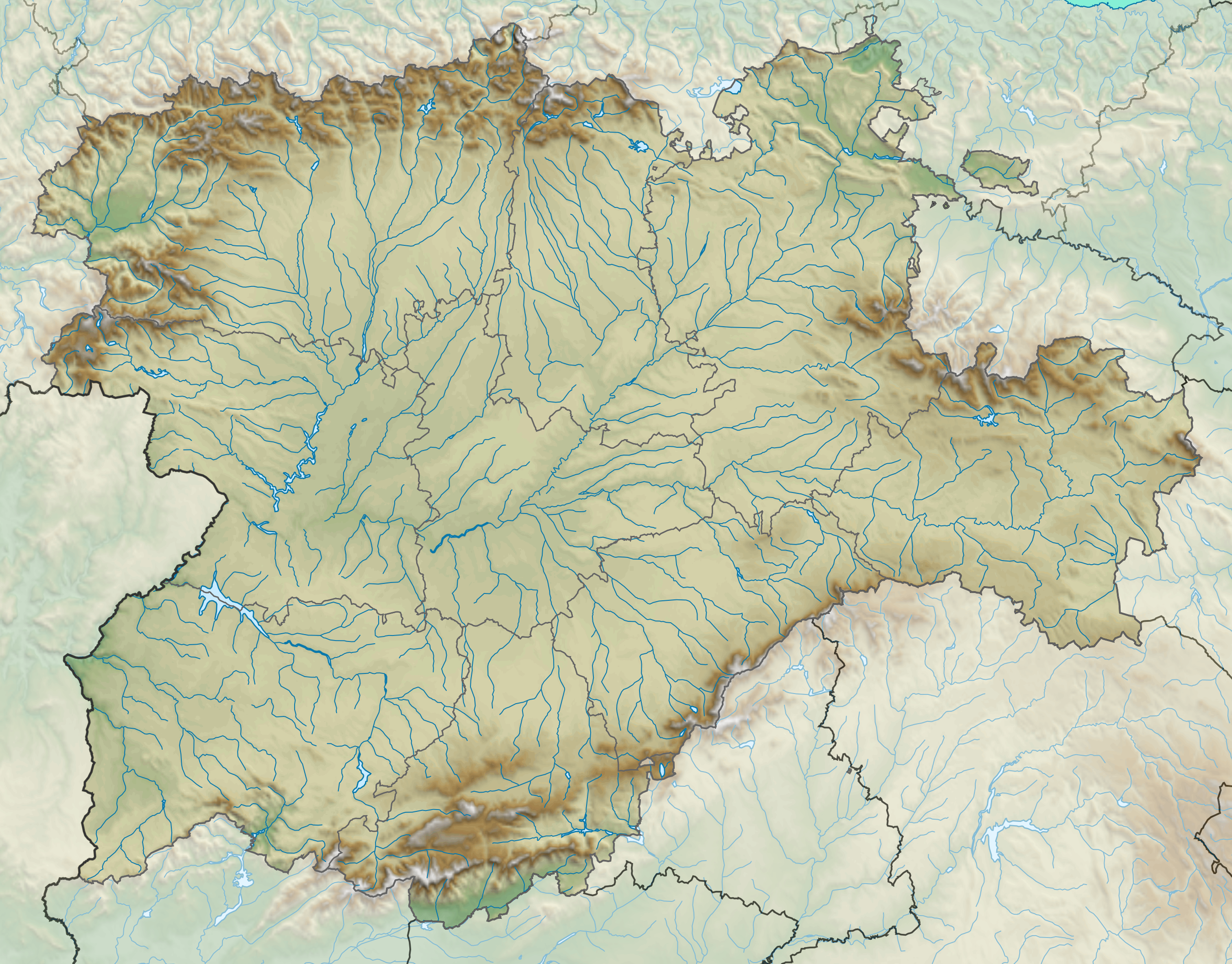
- Location within Castile and León Location within Spain
- Coordinates: 40°36′14″N 4°19′40″W
- Country: Spain
- Autonomous community: Castile and León
- Province: Ávila

Area
  - Total: 9,793 km^{2} (3,781 sq mi)
- Elevation: 1,300 m (4,300 ft)

Population (2025-01-01)
  - Total: 5,670
  - Density: 53.83/km^{2} (139.4/sq mi)
- Time zone: UTC+1 (CET)
  - Summer (DST): UTC+2 (CEST)
- Website: Official website

Las Navas del Marqués is a municipality of Spain belonging to the province of Ávila, in the autonomous community of Castile and León.

== Geography ==
The settlement is located to the south of the Sierra de Malagón (the westernmost subrange of the Sierra de Guadarrama), a string of elevations with relatively gentle slopes (including the Navazuelo; 1642 metres above sea level) separating the watersheds of the Douro and the Tagus.

== History ==
Las Navas became a secular lordship under the House of Dávila in 1372, during the Trastámara dynasty. Following the creation of the Marquisate of Las Navas in 1533, the building of the castle-palace and the convent of San Pablo took place in Las Navas. The marquisate's jurisdiction spanned across a territory over 378.67 km^{2} in area including the places of Navalperal, Hoyo de Pinares, Valdemaqueda, Robledo de Chavela, and Pelayos de la Presa.

== Population ==
Historical population
| Year | Pop. | ±% p.a. |
|---|---|---|
| 2023 | 5,362 | — |
| 2024 | 5,590 | +4.25% |
| 2025 | 5,670 | +1.43% |
Source: INE

== Bibliography ==
- Asenjo González, María (2023). "La adquisición comunal de territorios de una pequeña "villa" bajo señorío urbano: Villacastín versus Segovia". En la España Medieval. 43. Madrid: Ediciones Complutense: 27–47. doi:10.5209/elem.88009. ISSN 0214-3038.
- Monsalvo Antón, José María (1997). "Las dos escalas de la señorialización nobiliaria al sur del Duero concejos de villa-y-tierra frente a la señorialización "menor". (Estudio a partir de casos del sector occidental: señoríos abulenses y salmantinos)" (PDF). Revista d'historia medieval (8): 275–335. ISSN 1131-7612.
- Sánchez González, Antonio (2024). "Los archivos de los señores de Villafranca, marqueses de Las Navas y condes del Risco en tierras de Ávila". Revista General de Información y Documentación. 34 (1). Madrid: Ediciones Complutense: 163–185. doi:10.5209/rgid.97106. ISSN 1132-1873.
