= Cofio (river) =

Tributary in Spain

Coordinates: 40.3961°N 4.3146°W

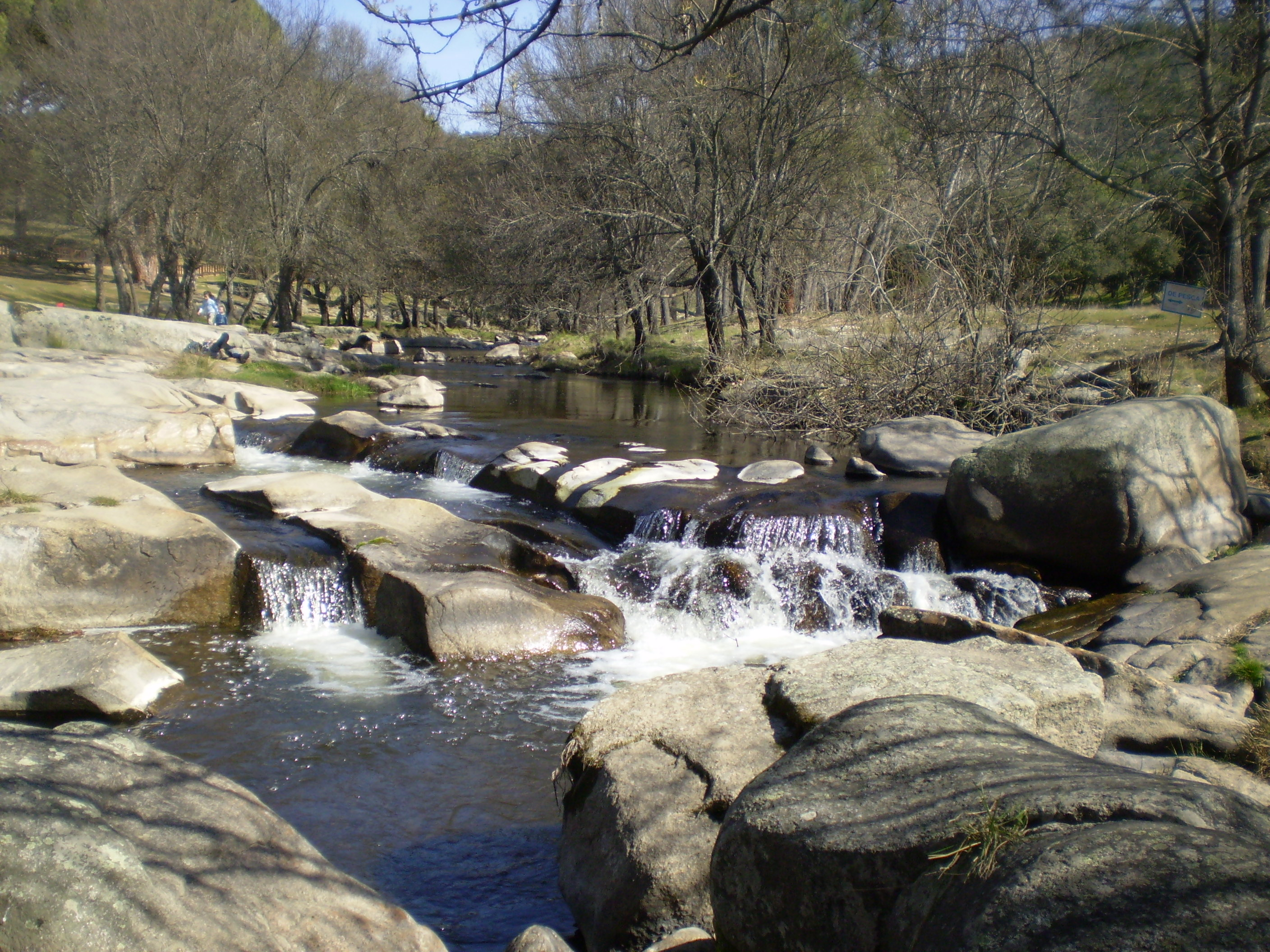
- The Cofio near Valdemaqueda

Location
- Country: Spain

Physical characteristics
- Source
  - location: Sierra de Malagón
- Mouth
  - location: San Juan Reservoir
- Length: 51 km (32 mi)
- Basin size: 638.2 km^{2} (246.4 sq mi)
- Discharge
  - location: Foronomic station #3180 (San Martín de Valdeiglesias) (Note: Data for the 1962–2015 period.)
  - average: 4.54 m^{3}/s
  - minimum: 0.68 m^{3}/s
  - maximum: 11.10 m^{3}/s

Basin features
- Progression: Alberche→ Tagus→ Atlantic Ocean

Cofio River is a tributary of Alberche River, Spain. Featuring a total length of 51 km, it drains a basin area of 638.2 km^{2}.
