= Pelayos de la Presa =

- Municipality
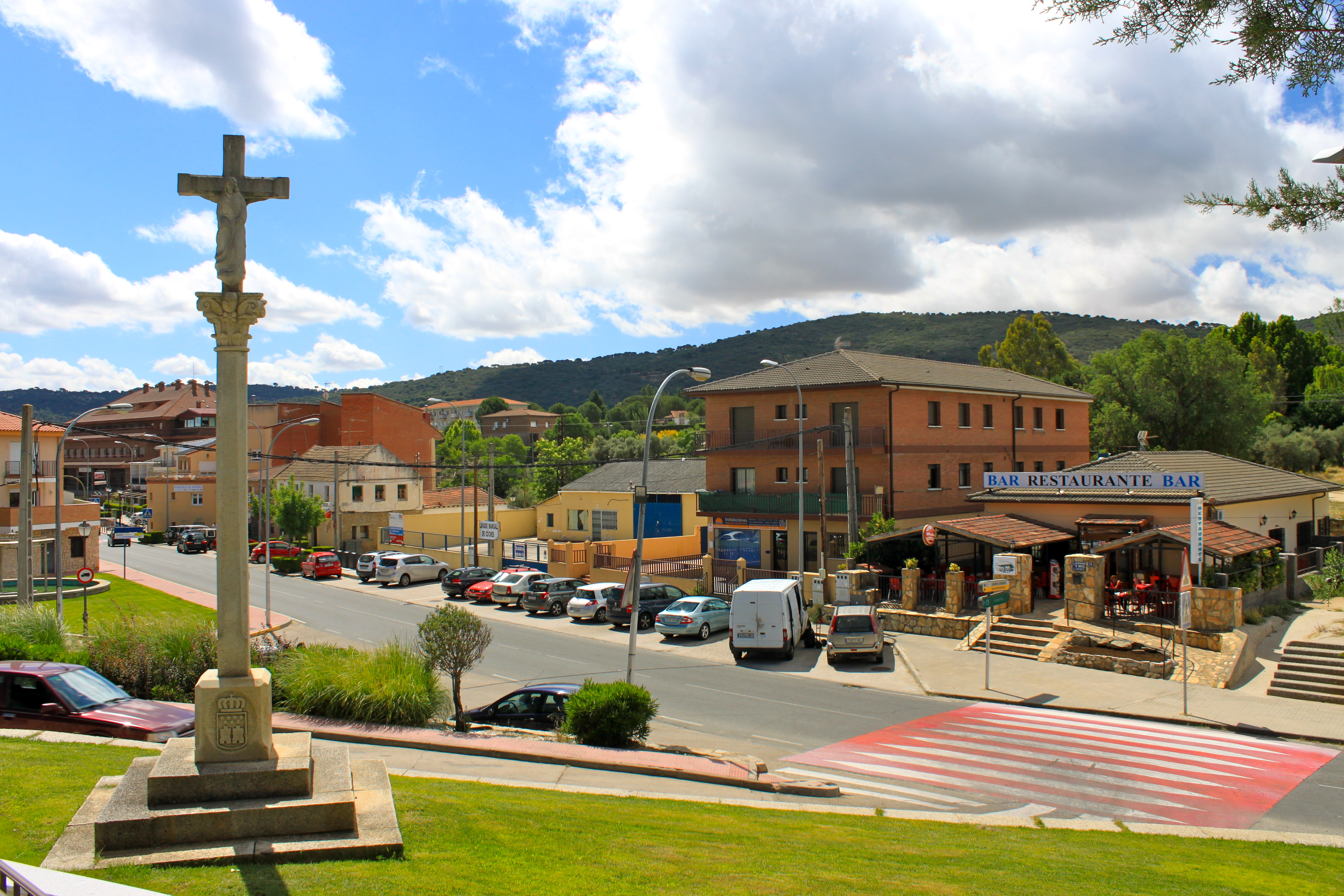

- Flag Coat of arms

- Location within Spain Location within Community of Madrid
- Coordinates: 40°21′33″N 4°20′9″W
- Country: Spain
- Region: Community of Madrid

Area
  - Total: 7.58 km^{2} (2.93 sq mi)
- Elevation: 570 m (1,870 ft)

Population (2025-01-01)
  - Total: 3,195
  - Density: 422/km^{2} (1,090/sq mi)
- Demonym(s): Pelayero, -a
- Time zone: UTC+1 (CET)
  - Summer (DST): UTC+2 (CEST)
- Postal code: 28696

Pelayos de la Presa (Spanish pronunciation: [peˈlaʝos ðe la ˈpɾesa]) is a municipality in the Community of Madrid, Spain. It covers an area of 7.58 km^{2}. As of 2018, it has a population of 2,475.

It is located in the southwest of the region, near the San Juan Reservoir (retaining the waters of the Alberche), the source the municipal water supplies come from. The reservoir is shared between Pelayos de la Presa, Navas del Rey and San Martín de Valdeiglesias, with Pelayos de la Presa having jurisdiction over "El Muro" area. As it is the only reservoir in the region declared as swimming area, it attracts tourism. The Monastery of Santa María de Valdeiglesias, with its origins dating back to the 12th century, cistercian-style, is located in the municipality. It is located at 570 m over sea level.

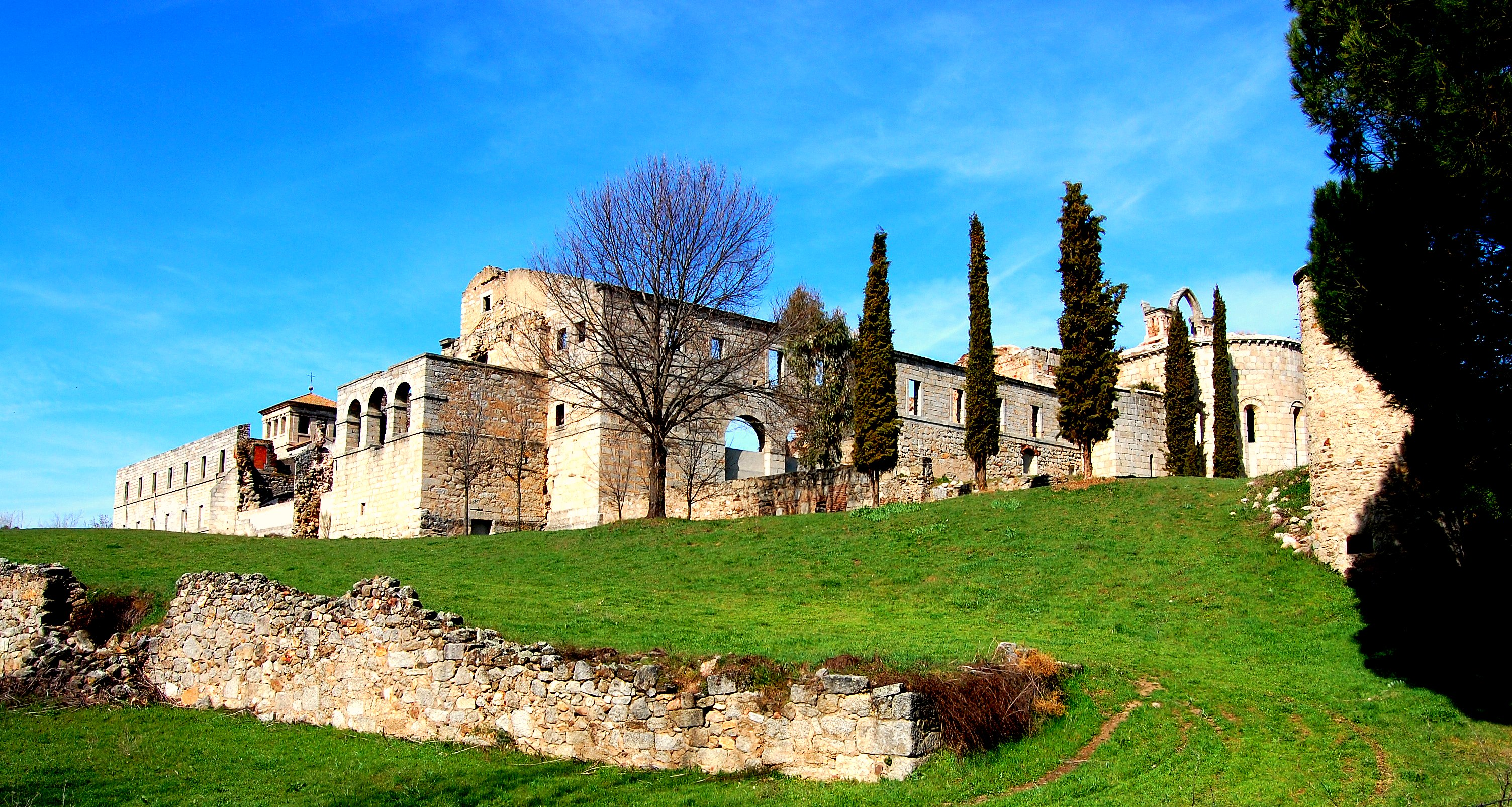
Monastery of Santa María de Valdeiglesias

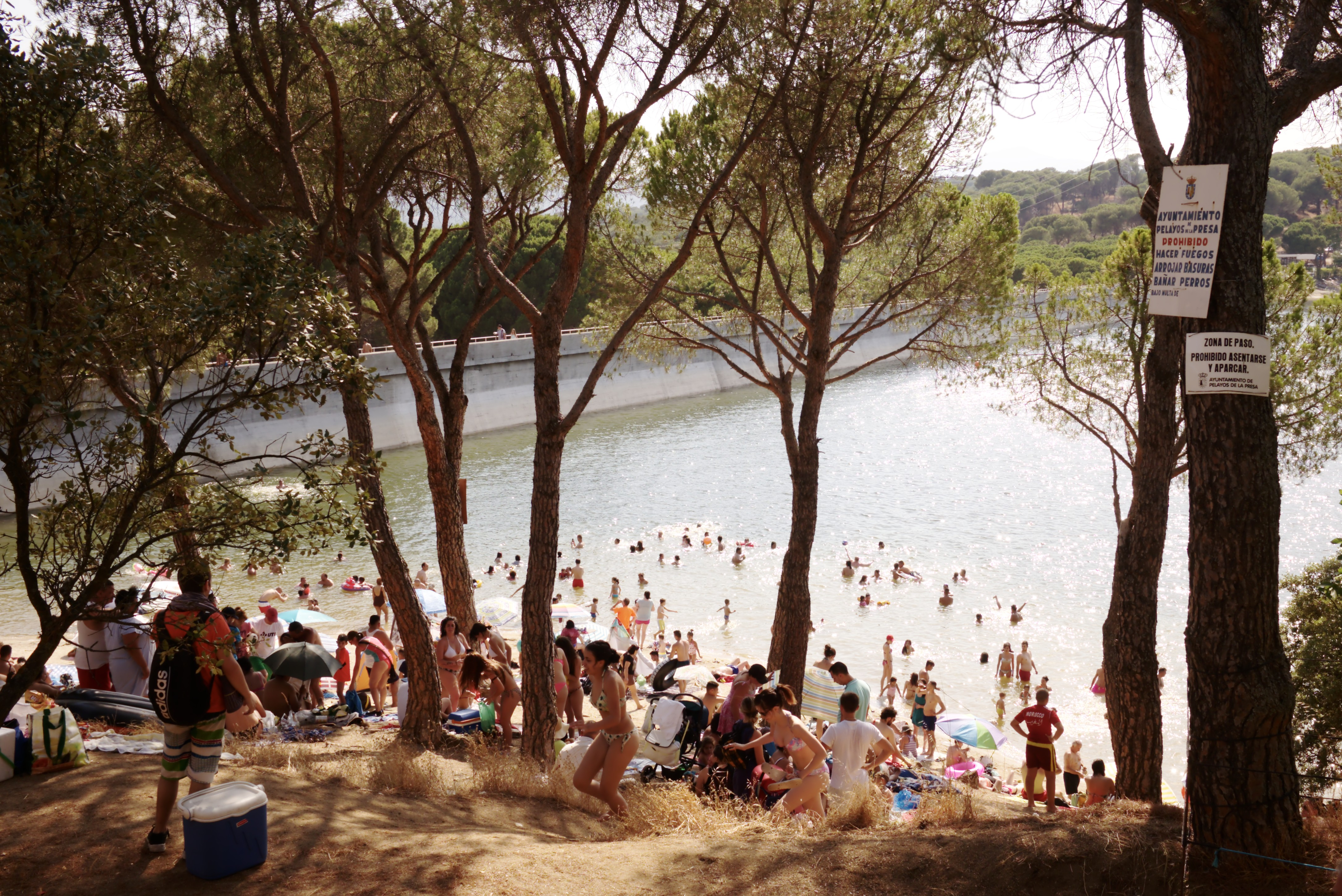
San Juan Reservoir
