= Burguillo Reservoir Arch Bridge =

Bridge in Spain

- Coordinates: 40.4282°N 4.5392°W
- Carries: 2 lanes of N-403
- Crosses: El Burguillo Reservoir
- Locale: El Tiemblo, Ávila, Spain
- Maintained by: Spanish Ministry of Public Works

Characteristics
- Design: Concrete arch bridge
- Total length: 260m
- Width: 12m
- Longest span: 165m

History
- Construction cost: €2.4million

The Burguillo Reservoir Arch Bridge is a reinforced concrete arch bridge crossing the El Burguillo Reservoir near Ávila, Spain. Crossing the part of the reservoir known as "Garganta Honda" (deep throat), it is part of the 8km long El Tiemblo bypass. Of the €5.1 million cost of the bypass, the bridge comprised about €2.4 million. Construction began in 1997. The arch was built by a segmental construction method using travelling formwork.
