= San Juan Reservoir =

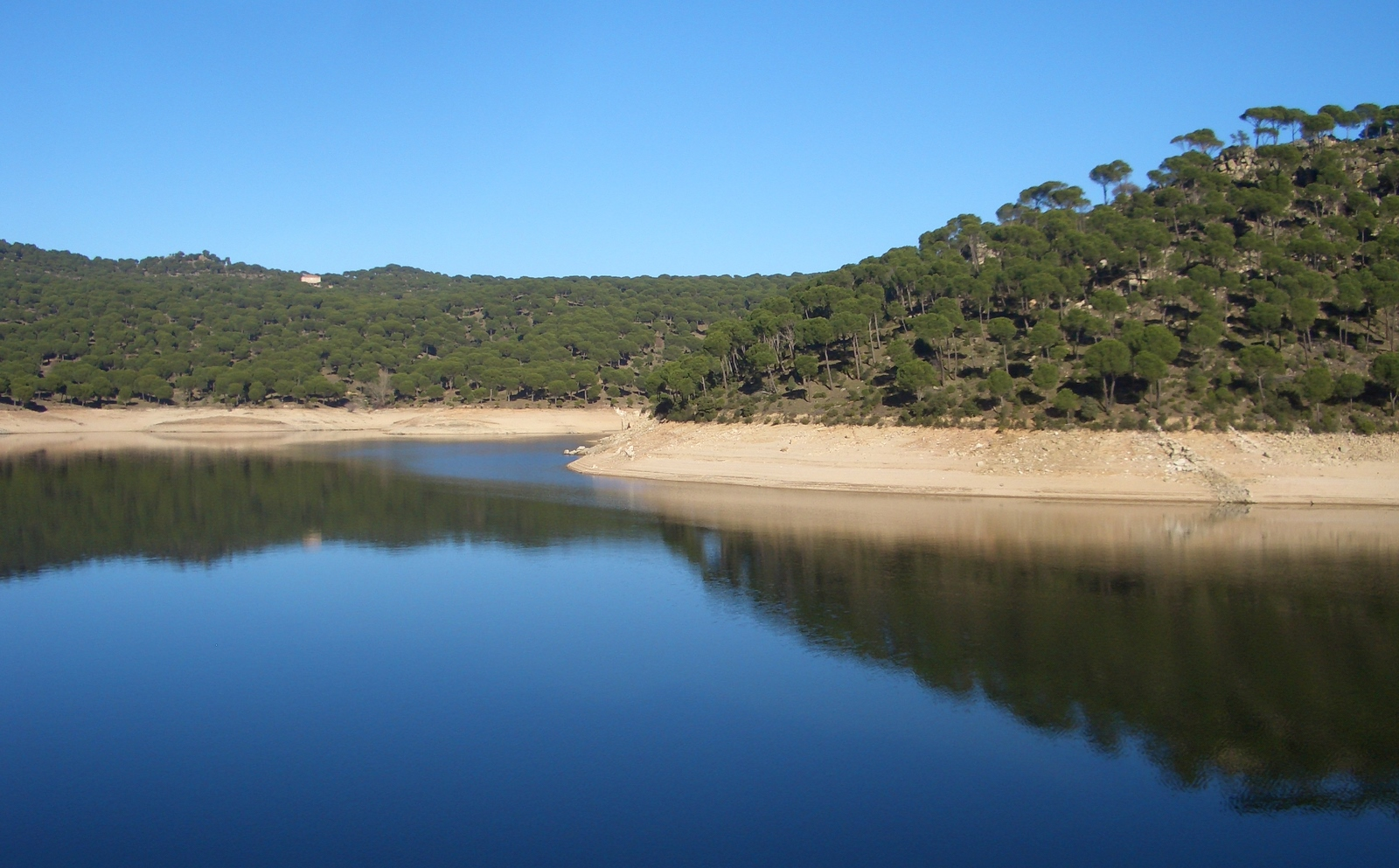
- Interactive map of San Juan Reservoir
- Location: San Martín de Valdeiglesias, El Tiemblo, Cebreros, and Pelayos de la Presa, Autonomous Community of Madrid, Spain
- Coordinates: 40°20′N 4°20′W
- Type: Reservoir
- Primary inflows: Alberche River
- Basin countries: Spain
- Surface area: 650 ha (1,600 acres)
- Water volume: 138 cubic kilometers (33 cubic miles)

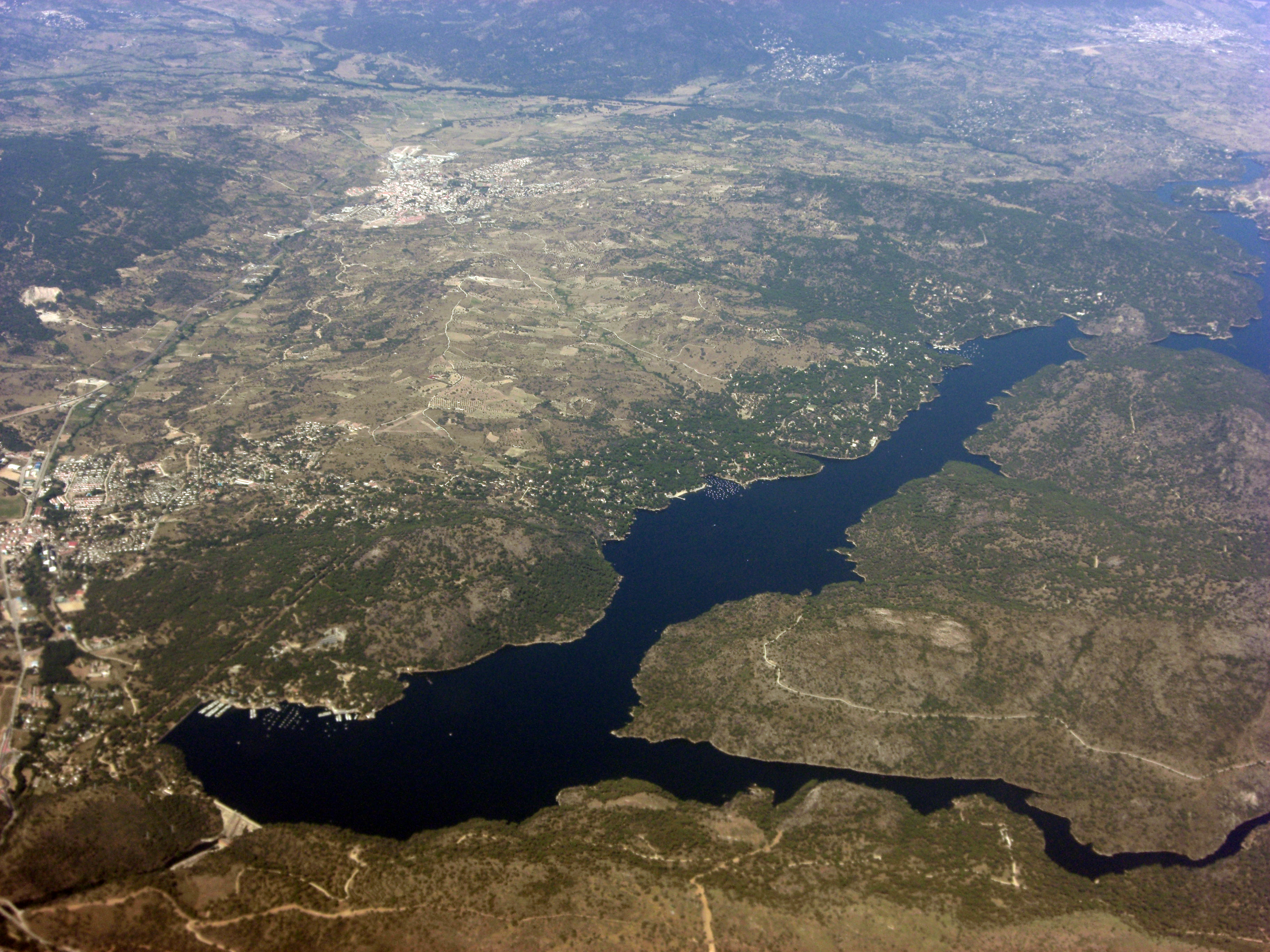
Aerial view.

The San Juan reservoir (Embalse de San Juan, in Spanish) is located along the Alberche river between the municipalities of San Martín de Valdeiglesias, El Tiemblo, Cebreros, and Pelayos de la Presa, at the south-eastern end of the Autonomous Community of Madrid, bordering on the province of Ávila.

The reservoir was built in 1955 and has a capacity of 138 km3, covers a surface area of 650 hectares, and is managed by the Confederación Hidrográfica del Tajo.

Since the 1990s, one of its main functions has been to deliver water to the city of Toledo along the canal known as the Trasvase Picadas-Toledo. It also generates electricity and supplies water to the south-eastern part of the Autonomous Community of Madrid. In addition, recreational use (bathing and sailing) is permitted and is a popular destination for the inhabitants of Madrid.
