= Gaznata =

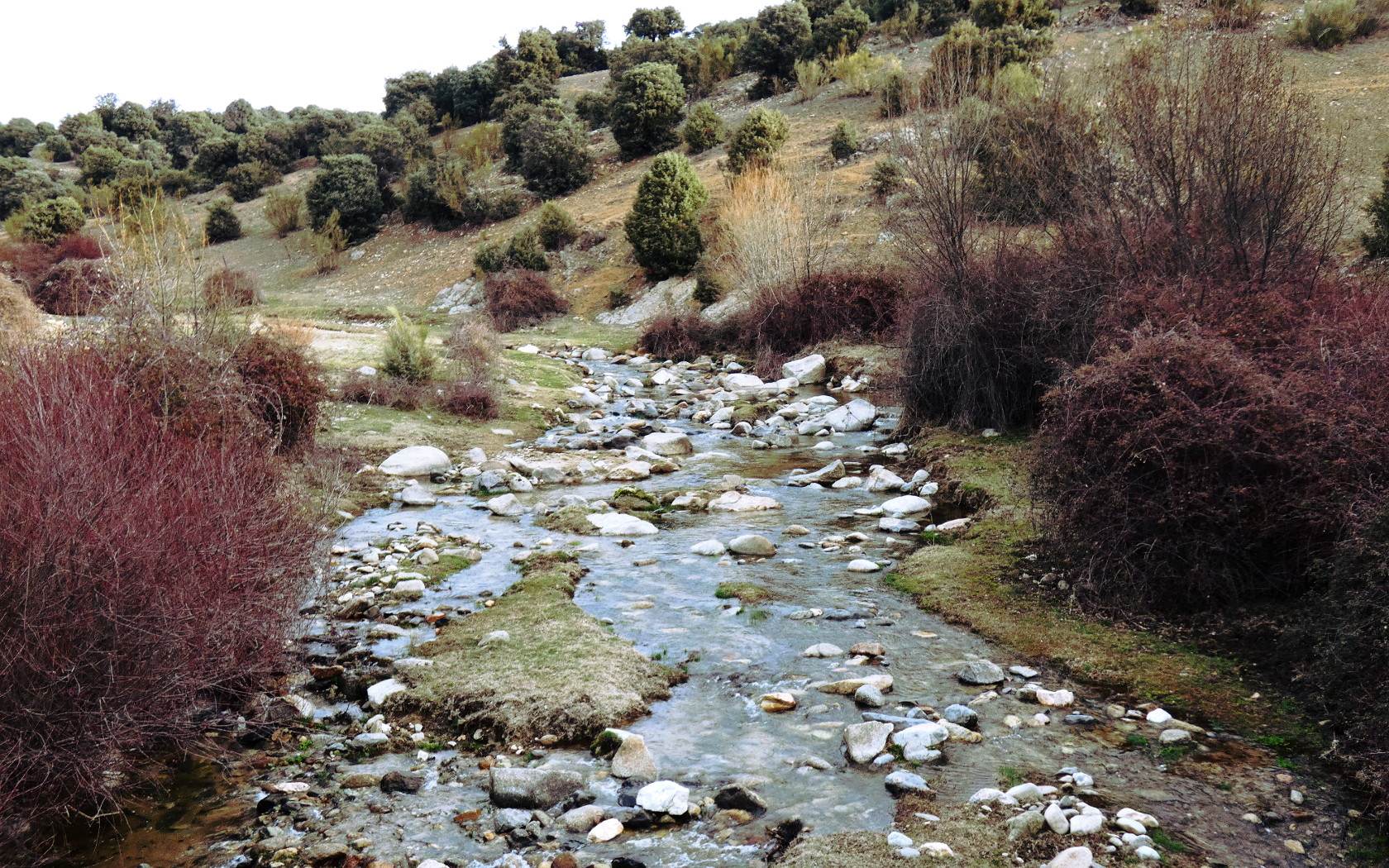

Location
- Country: Spain

Physical characteristics
- Source: Fuente del Cuadrón
  - location: Prado Cuadrón
  - coordinates: 40°37′16″N 4°29′1″W
- Mouth: Alberche
  - location: El Burguillo Reservoir
  - coordinates: 40°35′37″N 4°33′52″W
- Length: 27.20 km (16.90 mi)
- Basin size: 164.20 km^{2}

Basin features
- Progression: Alberche→ Tagus→ Atlantic Ocean
- River system: Tagus

The Gaznata is a river of Spain located in the centre of the Iberian Peninsula, a left-bank tributary of the Alberche.

It springs out of the Fuente del Cuadrón, in the Prado Cuadrón area close to La Cañada. Flowing southwards along a total length of 27.20 km, it empties in the Alberche, specifically into El Burguillo Reservoir, draining a catchment area of 164.20 km^{2}.

The name Gaznata has been proposed to have a Berber origin, tentatively identified as "Wād-al-Zanāta", Zanāta referring to the Zenata berber tribe.
