= El Burguillo Reservoir =

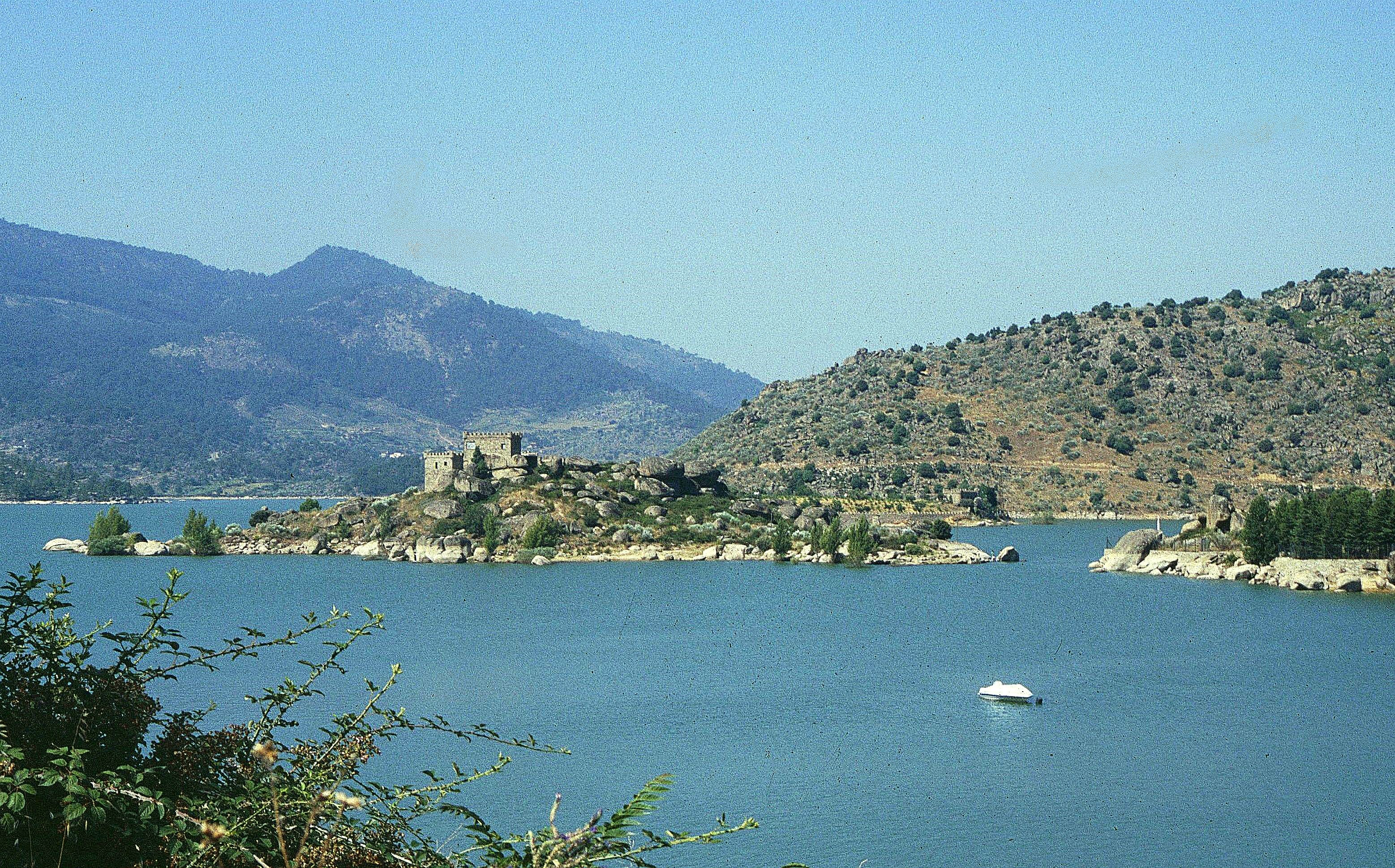
- View of the reservoir

- Location of the Burguillo Reservoir El Burguillo Reservoir (Spain)
- Interactive map of El Burguillo Reservoir
- Country: Spain
- Location: Province of Ávila
- Coordinates: 40°25′29″N 4°33′59″W
- Status: Operational
- Opening date: January 1, 1913; 113 years ago

Dam and spillways
- Type of dam: Gravity dam
- Impounds: Alberche, Gaznata
- Height: 91 m (299 ft)

Reservoir
- Total capacity: 208 hm^{3} (7.3×10^{9} cu ft)
- Surface area: 910 ha (2,200 acres)

Power Station
- Installed capacity: 48 MW (64,000 hp)

The El Burguillo Reservoir is located along the Alberche river in the province of Ávila, Spain, between the municipalities of El Tiemblo and El Barraco.

It was inaugurated in 1913 and is the first and highest reservoir along the Alberche River. The water is mostly used for agricultural purposes and to generate electricity. It is managed by the Confederación Hidrográfica del Tajo, which also allows recreational activities in the reservoir, such as bathing, sailing, and rowing.

== See also ==
- Burguillo Reservoir Arch Bridge
