= Monastery of Pelayos =

- Monasterio de Santa María la Real de Valdeiglesias (Spanish)
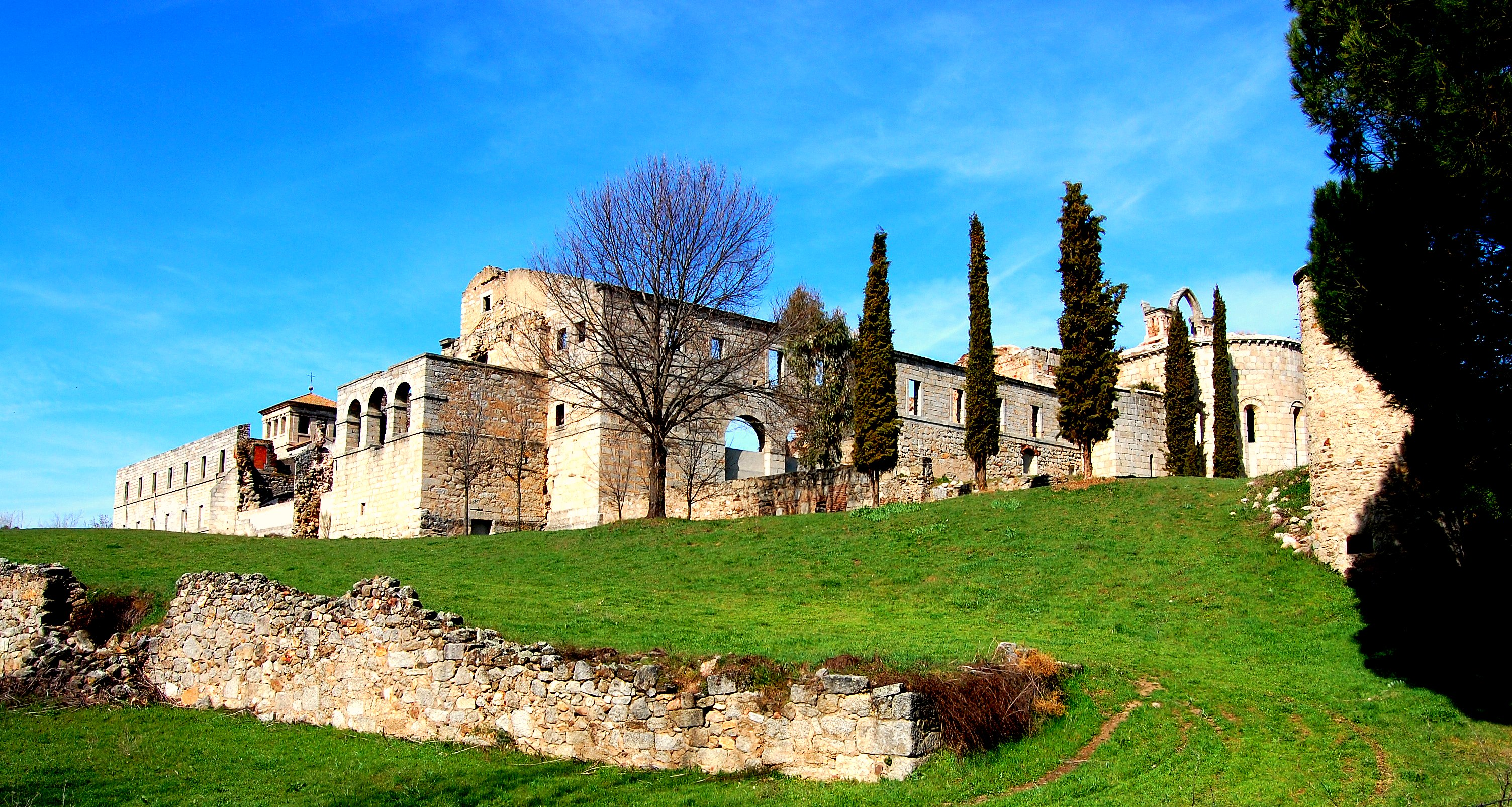

General information
- Status: ruins
- Type: monastery
- Location: Pelayos de la Presa, Community of Madrid, Spain
- Coordinates: 40.365944°N 4.322192°W
- Owner: Ayuntamiento de Pelayos de la Presa

Spanish Cultural Heritage
- Official name: Monasterio de Pelayos (Ruinas)
- Type: Non-movable
- Criteria: Monument
- Designated: 23 November 1983
- Reference no.: RI-51-0004982

The Monastery of Pelayos (Note: Variously referred to in Spanish by names such as monasterio de Santa María la Real de Valdeiglesias, monasterio de Santa María de Valdeiglesias or simply as monasterio de Pelayos.) is a Cistercian monastery in a state of ruin located in Pelayos de la Presa, Community of Madrid.

== History and description ==
The monastery is located in the north bank of Arroyo de la Presa, close to Pelayos de la Presa's housing. Built on behalf of the Order of Cistercians, its construction dates back to the 12th century, although it underwent substantial refurbishing works starting in the 15th century. The 1836 desamortización ('ecclesial confiscation') of Mendizábal pertaining monastic properties and subsequent departure of the monks underpinned the beginning of the ruin process.

Architect Mariano García Benito purchased the ruins and invested in their rehabilitation. In 2003, García Benito donated the monastery to the municipal corporation.

The landmark was declared Bien de Interés Cultural pursuant to a 23 November 1983 Royal Decree, published in the BOE on 14 February 1984.

== Bibliography ==
- Lemus Molina, Lorena; Díaz Regodón, Inés (2005). "Estudio histórico-arquitectónico del monasterio de Santa María de Valdeiglesias". Actas del Cuarto Congreso Nacional de Historia de la Construcción: Cádiz, 27-29 de enero de 2005. Vol. 1. pp. 329–340. ISBN 84-9728-147-0.
