= Alberche =

River in Spain

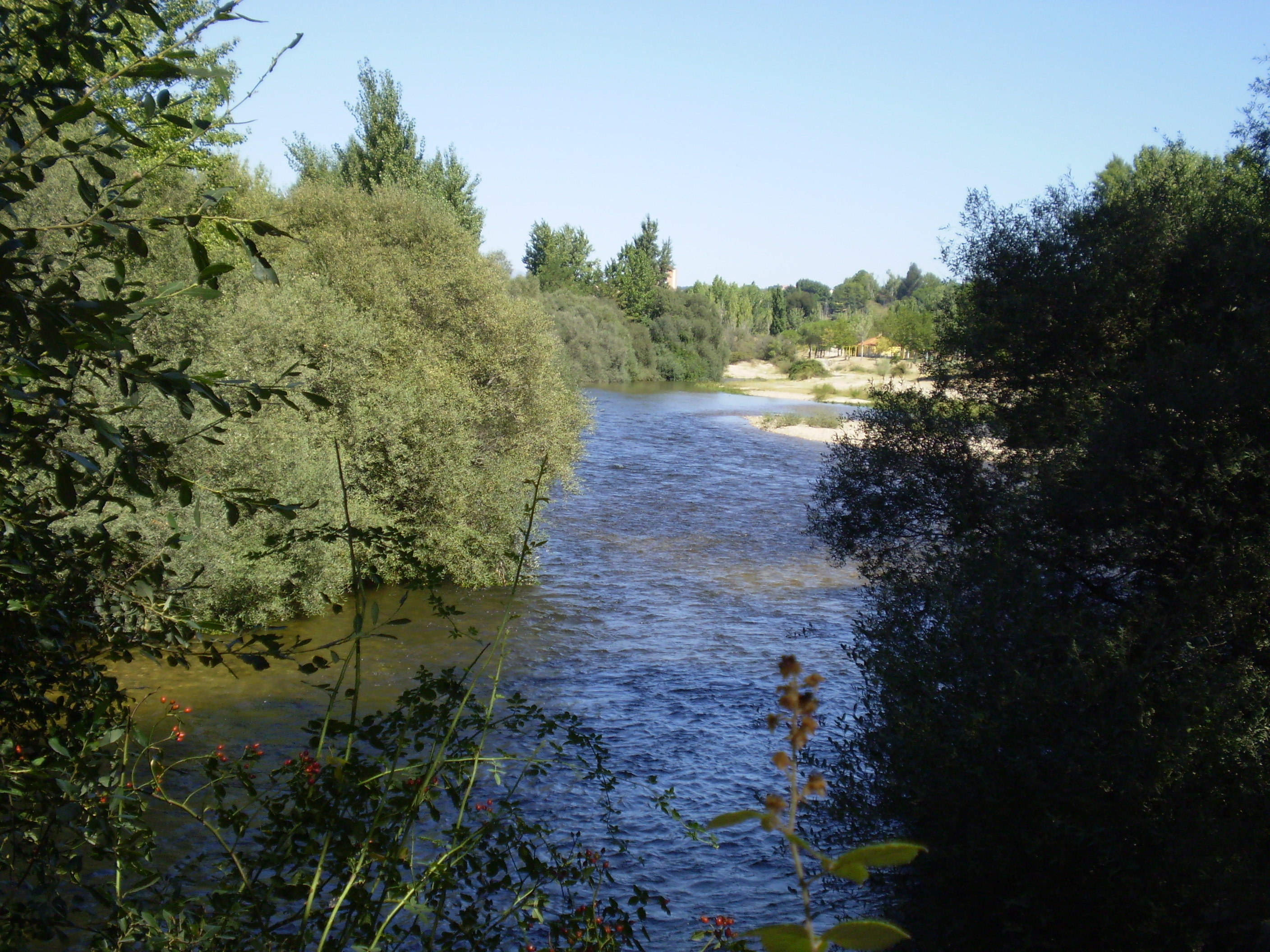
- The Alberche near Aldea del Fresno

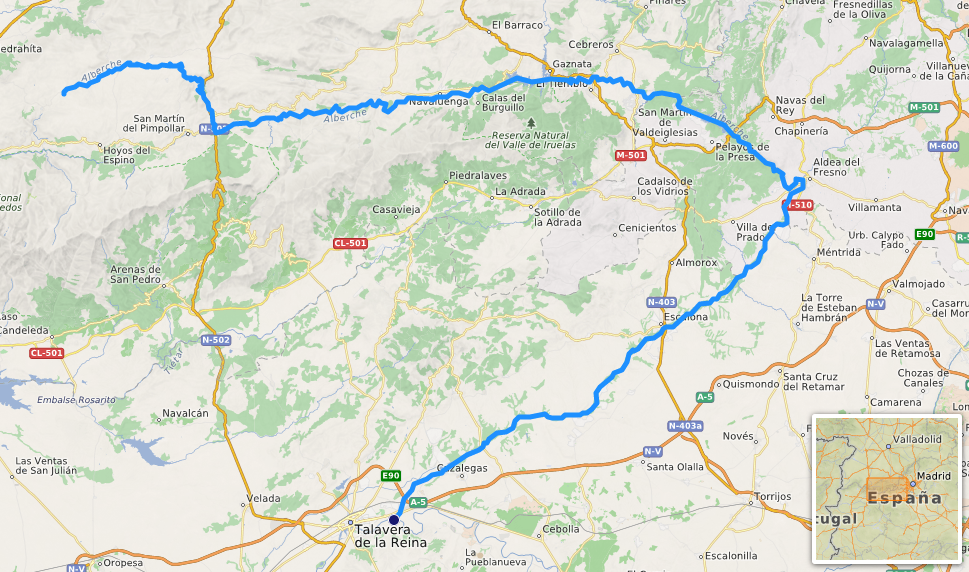

Location
- Country: Spain

Physical characteristics
- Source: Fuente Alberche, Sierra de Villafranca
  - location: Ávila Province
  - coordinates: 40°24′37″N 5°13′28″W
  - elevation: 1,800 m (5,900 ft)
- Mouth: Tagus
  - location: Talavera de la Reina
  - coordinates: 39°57′49″N 4°46′16″W
  - elevation: 373 m (1,224 ft)
- Length: 100 km (62 mi)
- Basin size: 4,108 km^{2} (1,586 sq mi)
- Discharge
  - average: 14.7 m^{3}/s (520 cu ft/s)

Basin features
- Progression: Tagus→ Atlantic Ocean

The Alberche is a river in the provinces of Ávila, Madrid and Toledo, central Spain. It begins its course at 1,800 m in Fuente Alberche, San Martín de la Vega del Alberche municipal term, Ávila Province. It forms the natural division between the Sierra de Gredos and the Sierra de Guadarrama, in the Sistema Central.

The Alberche flows roughly from NW to SE and bends sharply midway in its course to flow from NE to SW. It meets the Tagus a few kilometres east of Talavera de la Reina. This river has the following dams along its course: Burguillo, Charco del Cura, San Juan, Picadas, and Cazalegas. Alberche Beach is a sandy beach stretch on the banks of the Alberche River, a favorite spot for vacationers from Madrid.

== Tributaries ==
- Gaznata
- Cofio
- Perales

== See also ==
- List of rivers of Spain
