= Perales (river) =

River in Spain

Coordinates: 40.3188°N 4.2076°W

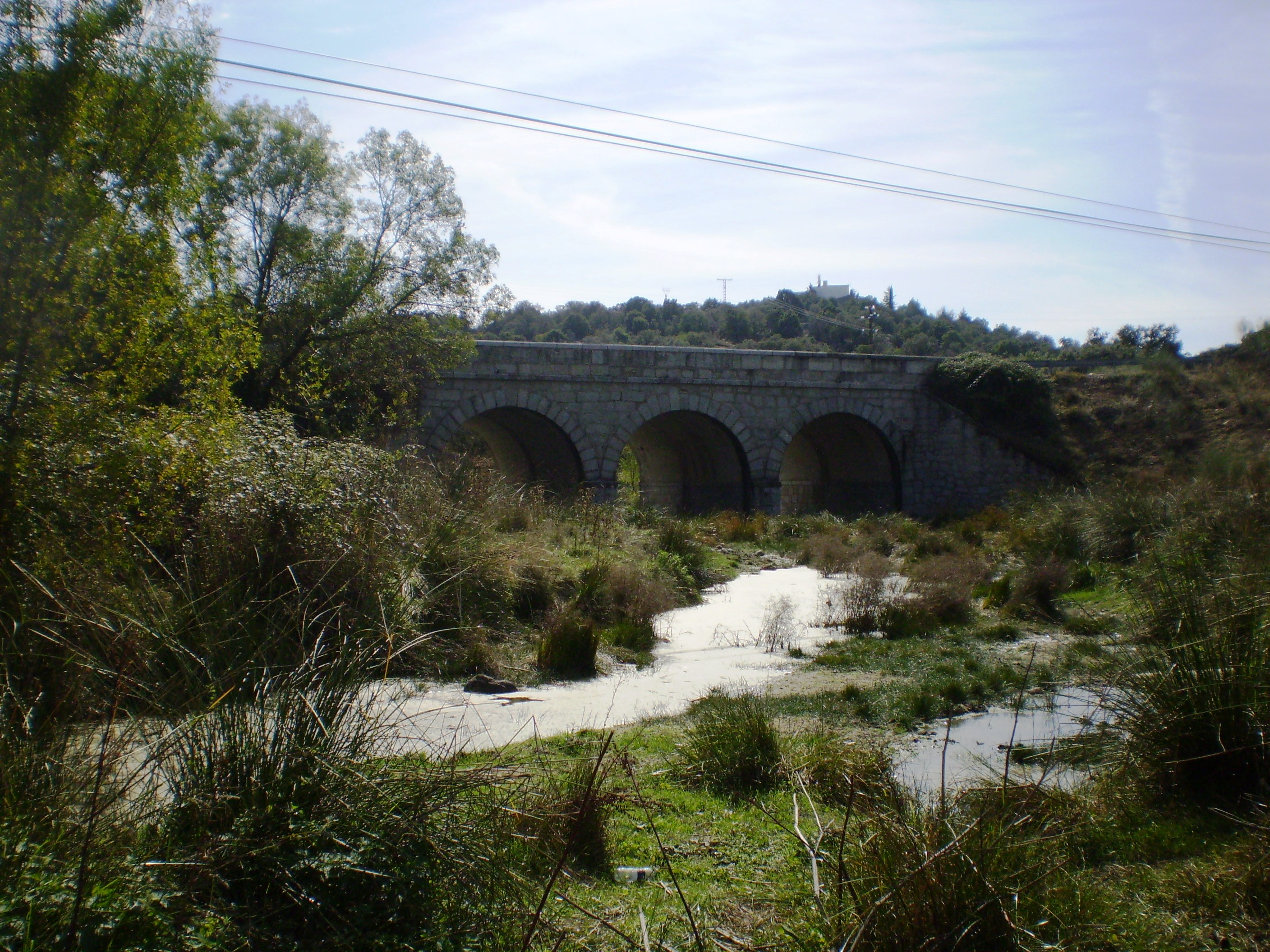
Perales River

The Perales River is a tributary of the Alberche River in Spain.

== See also ==
- List of rivers of Spain
