= San Martín de la Vega del Alberche =

- municipality
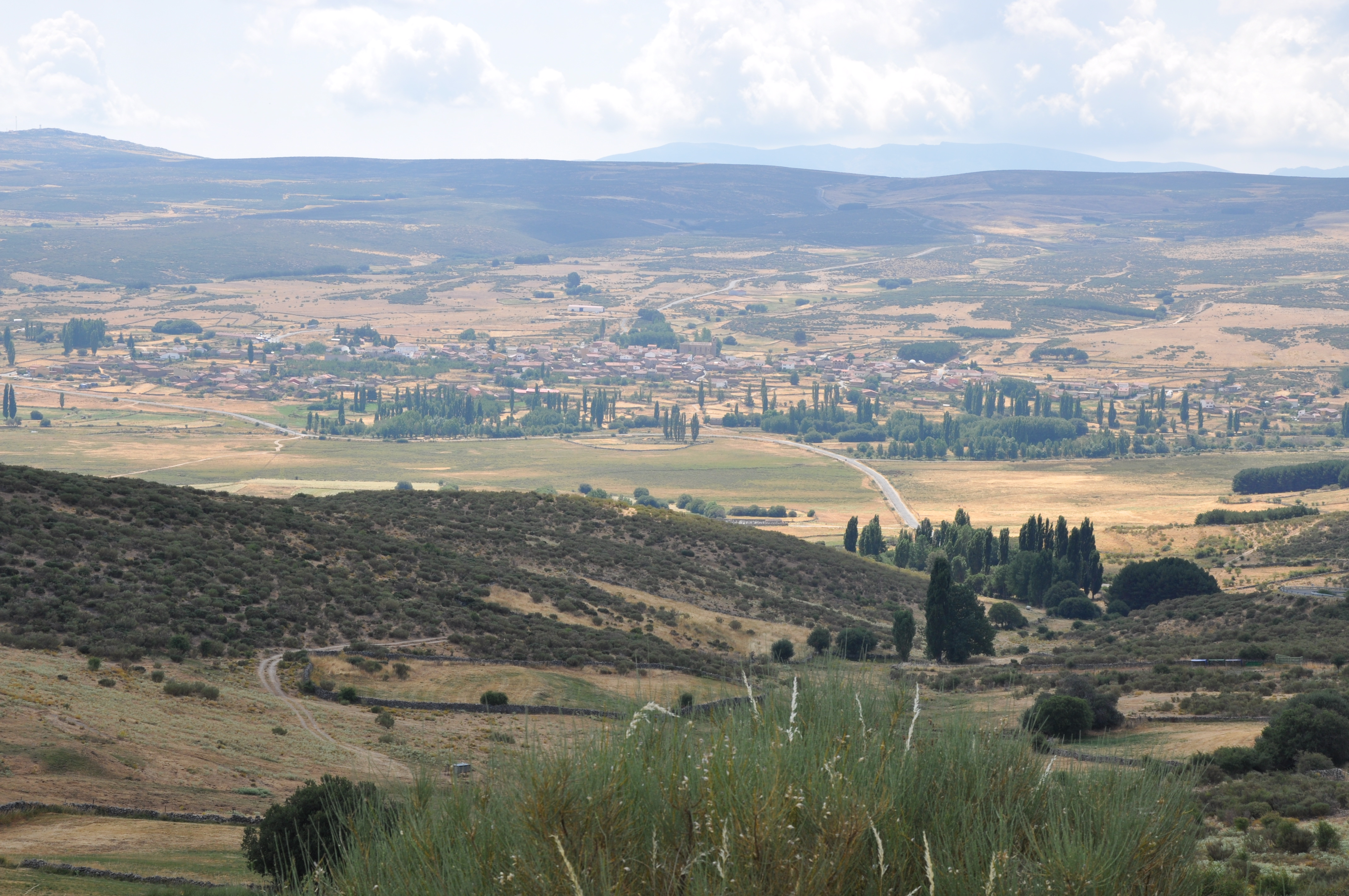
- San Martín de la Vega del Alberche from the Mountain pass of Chía

- Flag Coat of arms

- Location in Spain. San Martín de la Vega del Alberche (Spain)
- Coordinates: 40°25′52″N 5°09′24″W
- Country: Spain
- Autonomous community: Castile and León
- Province: Ávila
- Municipality: San Martín de la Vega del Alberche

Area
  - Total: 50 km^{2} (19 sq mi)

Population (2025-01-01)
  - Total: 163
  - Density: 3.3/km^{2} (8.4/sq mi)
- Time zone: UTC+1 (CET)
  - Summer (DST): UTC+2 (CEST)
- Website: Official website

San Martín de la Vega del Alberche is a town and municipality located in the province of Ávila, Castile and León, Spain. The Alberche River which has its source approximately 2 km west of the town, passes through the lower part of the town before joining the Tagus River (Rio Tajo) just east of Talavera de la Reina.

San Martin de la Vega del Alberche is located approximately 50 km by road (via N 502 and AV 510) from the provincial capital, and at 1,517 metres is the 4th highest, by altitude above sea level, in the province of Ávila and the 10th highest in Spain. Within easy reach of the Sierra de Gredos Regional Park, the town is popular with summer holidaymakers, and day-trippers, looking to escape the heat of the Castilian meseta.

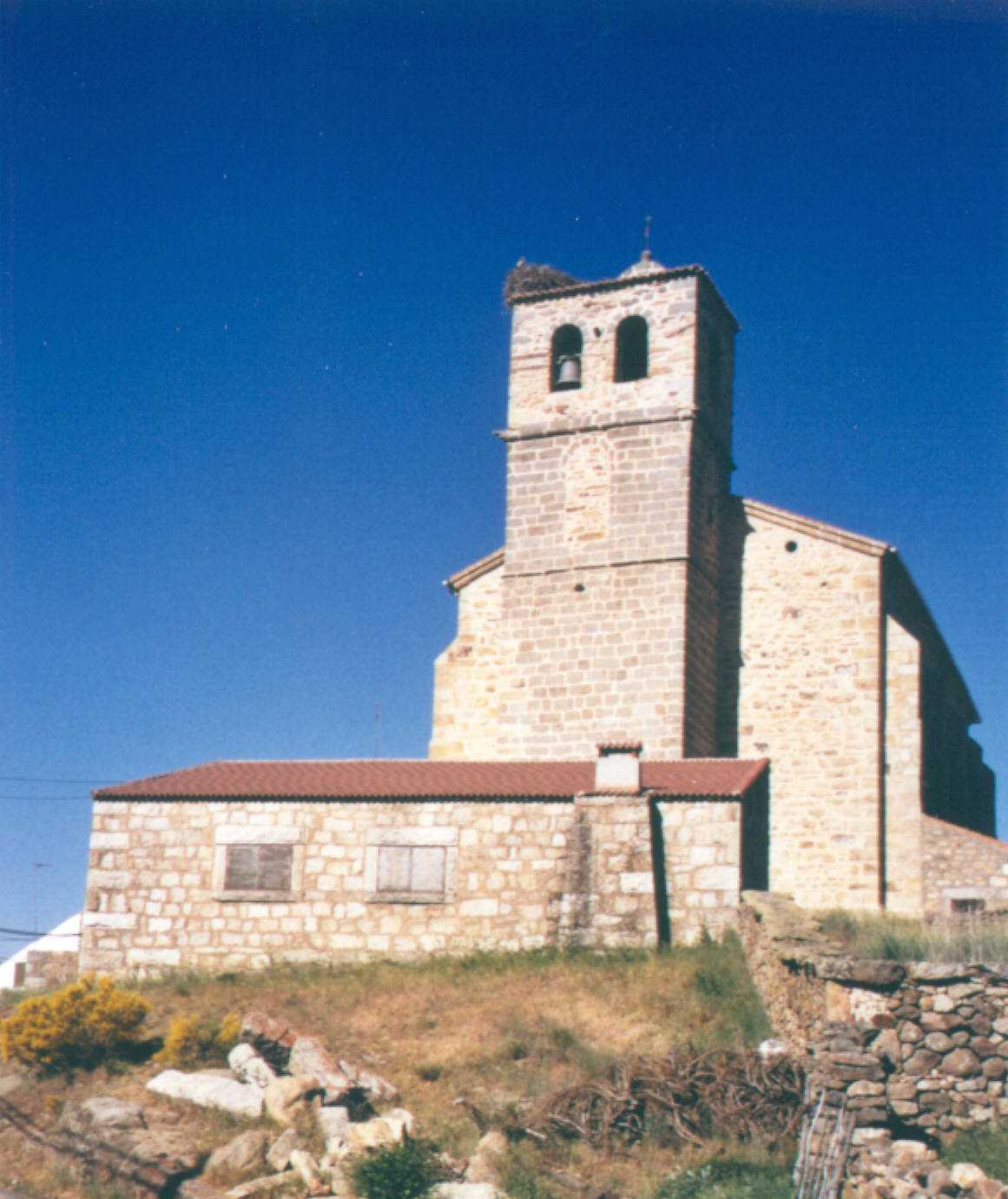
Iglesia Parroquial.

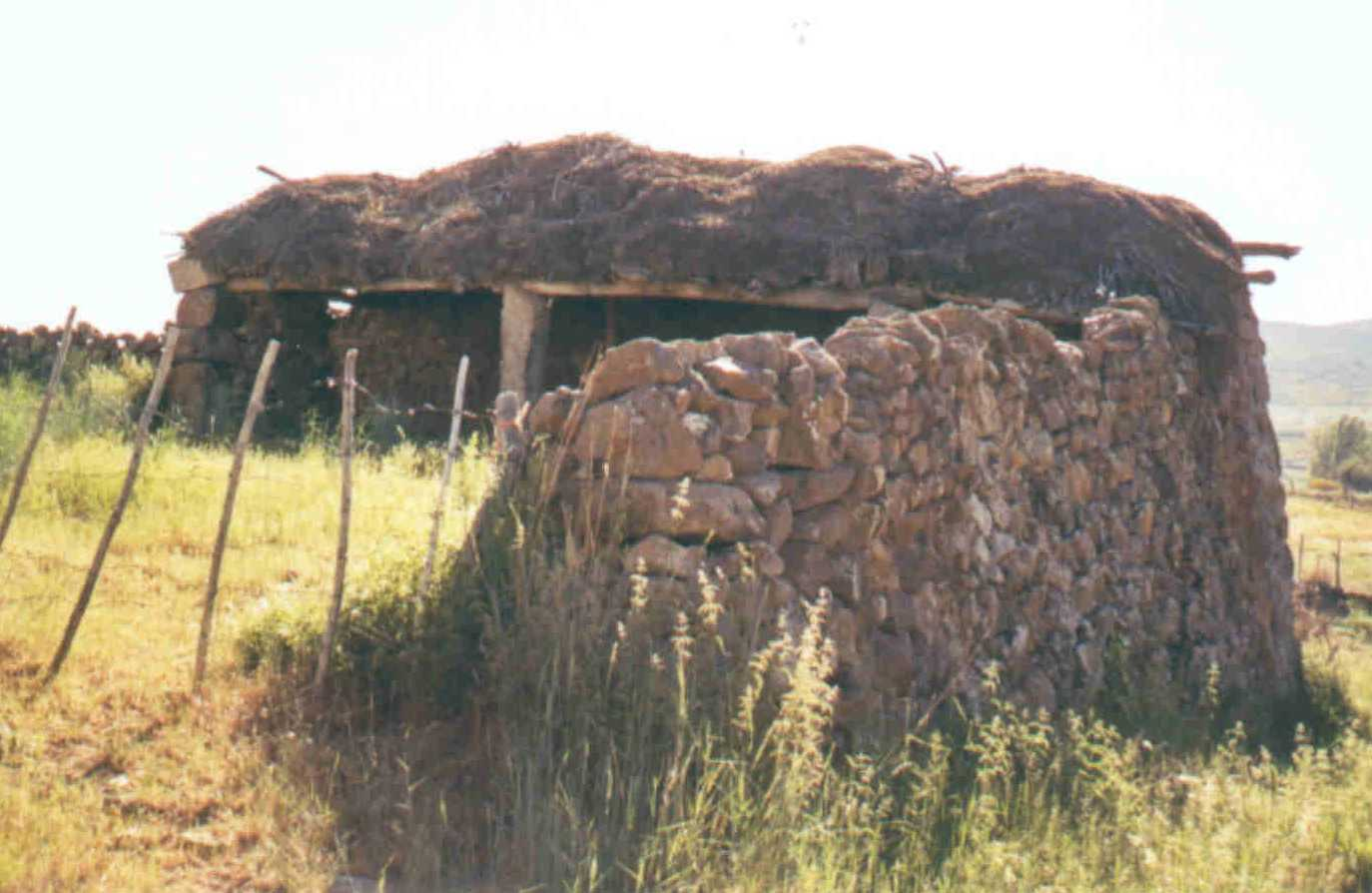
Numerous ancient oxen houses are found within the township.

== Population ==
Historical population
Year	Pop.	±% p.a.
2023	161	—
2024	153	−4.97%
2025	163	+6.54%
Source: INE
