= Navalperal de Pinares =

- municipality
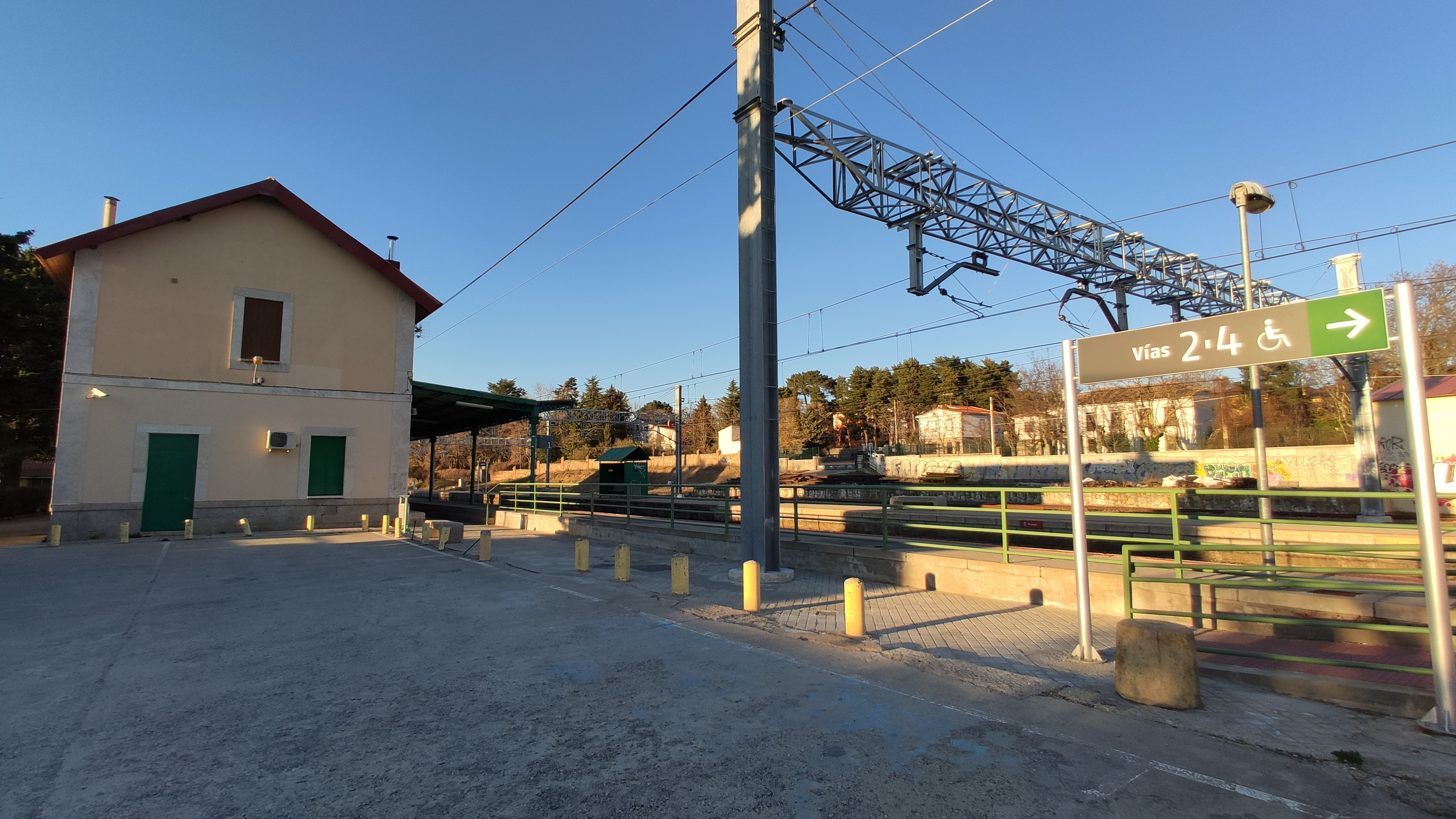

- Flag Coat of arms

- Location in Spain. Navalperal de Pinares (Spain)
- Coordinates: 40°35′40″N 4°24′39″W
- Country: Spain
- Autonomous community: Castile and León
- Province: Ávila
- Municipality: Navalperal de Pinares

Area
  - Total: 49 km^{2} (19 sq mi)
- Elevation: 1,287 m (4,222 ft)

Population (2025-01-01)
  - Total: 840
  - Density: 17/km^{2} (44/sq mi)
- Time zone: UTC+1 (CET)
  - Summer (DST): UTC+2 (CEST)
- Website: Official website

Navalperal de Pinares is a municipality located in the province of Ávila, Castile and León, Spain.

== History ==
In the sixteenth century becomes dependent on the Marquis of the Navas. This is reflected in the dome of the main chapel the parish church, which appears as cavalier stone shield of the Marquis. Navalperal remain socially and politically under the Marquis until well into the nineteenth century.

It has an area of 57.90 km^{2}, with a population of 792 inhabitants and a density of 23.69 inhabitants per km^{2}. It is at an altitude of 1287m and a distance of 28 km of Avila.

== Location ==
Navalperal de Pinares extends slightly hilly terrain with altitudes of around between 1200 and 1500, being the highest peak in the Valpardo area to 1517m.

It has a climate with cold winters and summers are slightly warmer. The predominant vegetation is the grass-rich meadows, among which are some stands of oak and pine scrub.

Throughout the town there are numerous springs, forming streams and creeks, that are responsible for maintaining the abundant fresh pasture and swell Becedas river flow in the south and to a lesser extent Voltoya basin, a tributary of the Duero, in northern .

From east to west and almost through the center of the municipality run the C-505 and the northern railway.

== Demographics and economics ==
The first demographic data come from the population census in the late sixteenth century where it states: "The place of Navalperal has a font of 156 neighbors."

In the eighteenth century contained only 172 inhabitants and 663 mid-nineteenth century inhabitants, increasing substantially in 1860 with the stationing of the railway. In the late nineteenth and early twentieth exceed 1000 inhabitants, arriving in 1960 to 1523 inhabitants.

Historically and until recent years, livestock is the main source of income. Currently allocated 5,000 hectares of pasture land which feed almost two thousand cows.

Excellent communication with Avila and Madrid, in conjunction with the landscape features and weather which will contribute to Navalperal, make the tourism sector, followed closely by livestock, is the basis of its economy.

Historical population
Year	Pop.	±% p.a.
2023	792	—
2024	826	+4.29%
2025	840	+1.69%
Source: INE
