= San Martín de Valdeiglesias =

Coordinates: 40.364°N 4.401°W

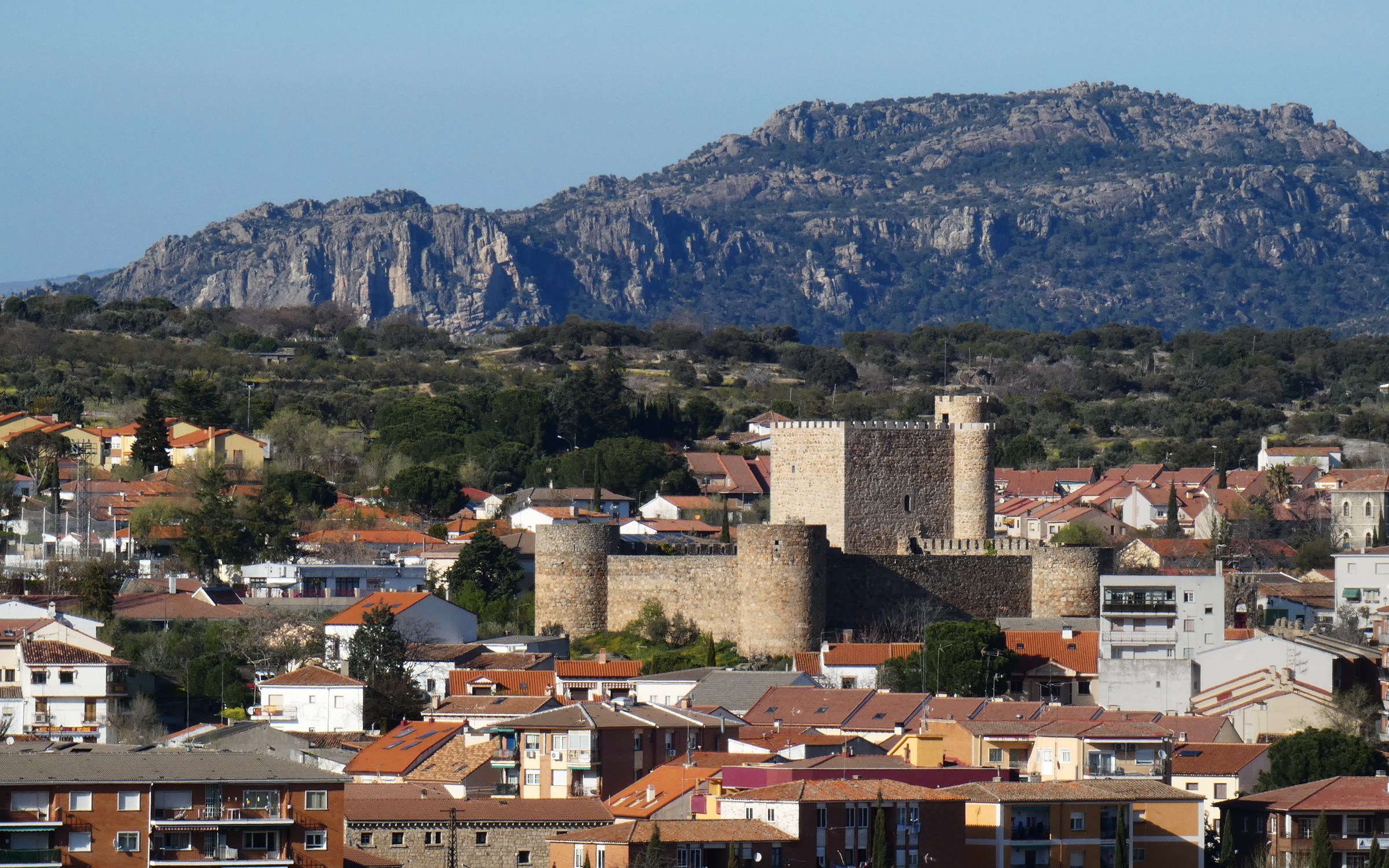
- View of San Martín de Valdeiglesias

- Flag Coat of arms

- Location in Spain.
- Country: Spain
- Autonomous community: Madrid

Area
  - Total: 115.5 km^{2} (44.6 sq mi)
- Elevation: 681 m (2,234 ft)

Population (2025-01-01)
  - Total: 9,324
  - Density: 80.73/km^{2} (209.1/sq mi)
- Time zone: UTC+1 (CET)
  - Summer (DST): UTC+2 (CEST)

San Martín de Valdeiglesias is a town of Comunidad de Madrid with a population is 8,812 people (2022).

== History ==
The Castle of Coracera was built in the fifteenth century.

== Geography ==
San Martín is near to Cadalso de los Vidrios, Pelayos de la Presa, Villa del Prado, Aldea del Fresno, Navas del Rey y Colmenar del Arroyo, other towns of Comunidad de Madrid, and it is also near the village of Ávila: El Tiemblo, and Pantano de San Juan.

== Culture ==
In the summer, San Martín, the population increases due to an influx of non-residents escaping the winter to spend their holidays.

The most well-known entertainers in the town are a music and dance group called "Grupo de Jotas María de la Nueva".

Festivals in San Martín are held between 7–12 September in honour of the Virgin Mary.
