= Valdemaqueda =

Coordinates: 40°31′N 4°18′W

- Municipality
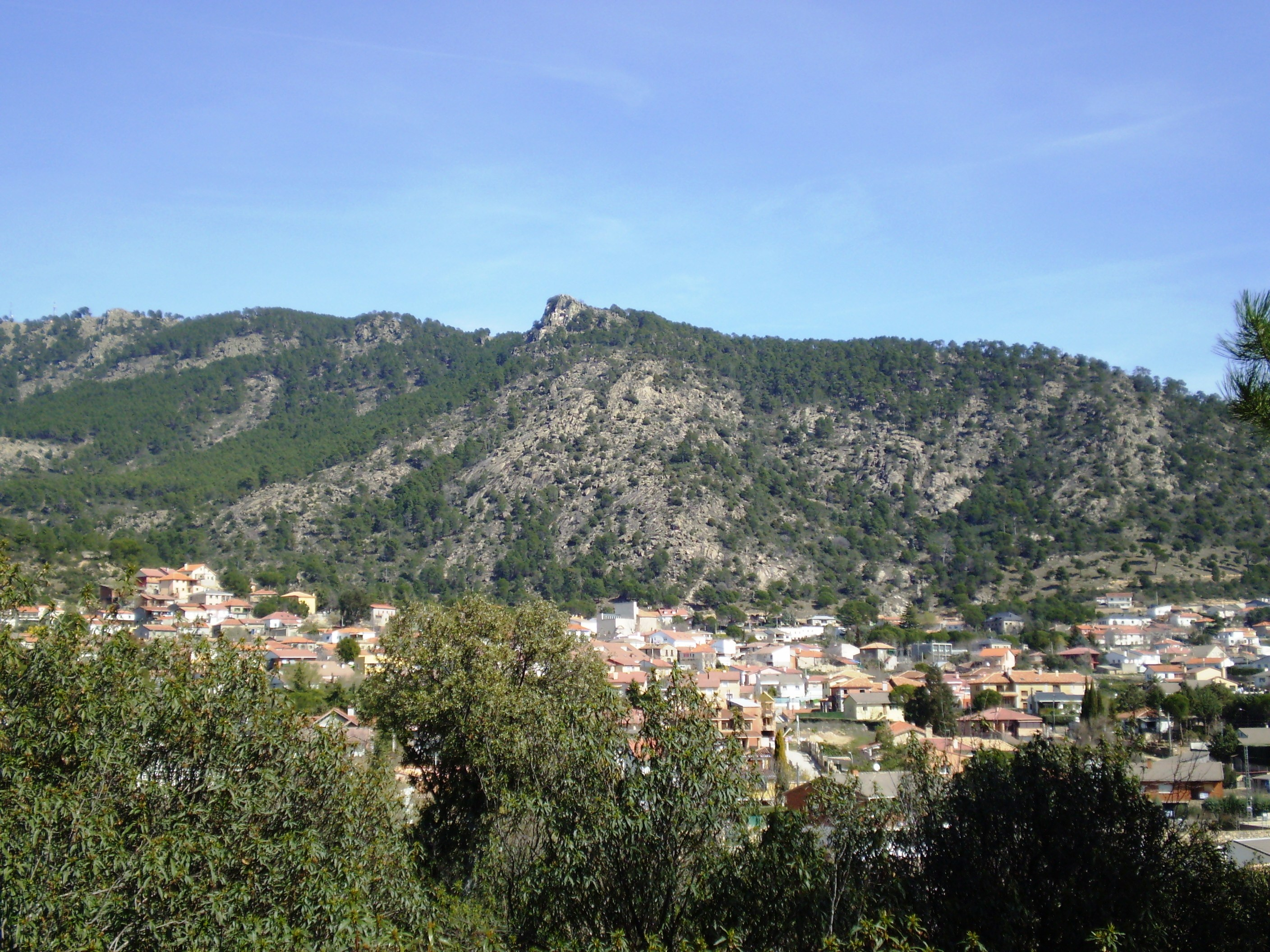
- General view of Valdemaqueda

- Flag Coat of arms

- Municipal location within the Community of Madrid.
- Country: Spain
- Autonomous community: Community of Madrid

Population (2025-01-01)
  - Total: 870
- Time zone: UTC+1 (CET)
  - Summer (DST): UTC+2 (CEST)

Valdemaqueda is a municipality of the Community of Madrid, Spain.
