= Navas del Rey =

Coordinates: 40°23′N 4°15′W

- Municipality
- Flag Coat of arms

- Municipal location within the Community of Madrid.
- Country: Spain
- Autonomous community: Community of Madrid

Population (2025-01-01)
  - Total: 3,420
- Time zone: UTC+1 (CET)
  - Summer (DST): UTC+2 (CEST)

Navas del Rey is a municipality of the Community of Madrid, Spain. It is located 52 kilometers from the city of Madrid, which is accessed by the road M-501.

Navas del Rey is located in a transition zone between the Sierra de Guadarrama and Sierra de Gredos. To the north, the municipality borders the village of Robledo de Chavela, east to the towns of Chapinería and Colmenar del Arroyo, south to Aldea del Fresno, and west Pelayos Dam and San Martin de Valdeiglesias. Along with other municipalities make up what is called the Commonwealth of Pinares, through which are channeled much of the initiatives from the various municipalities that are grouped in this commonwealth.

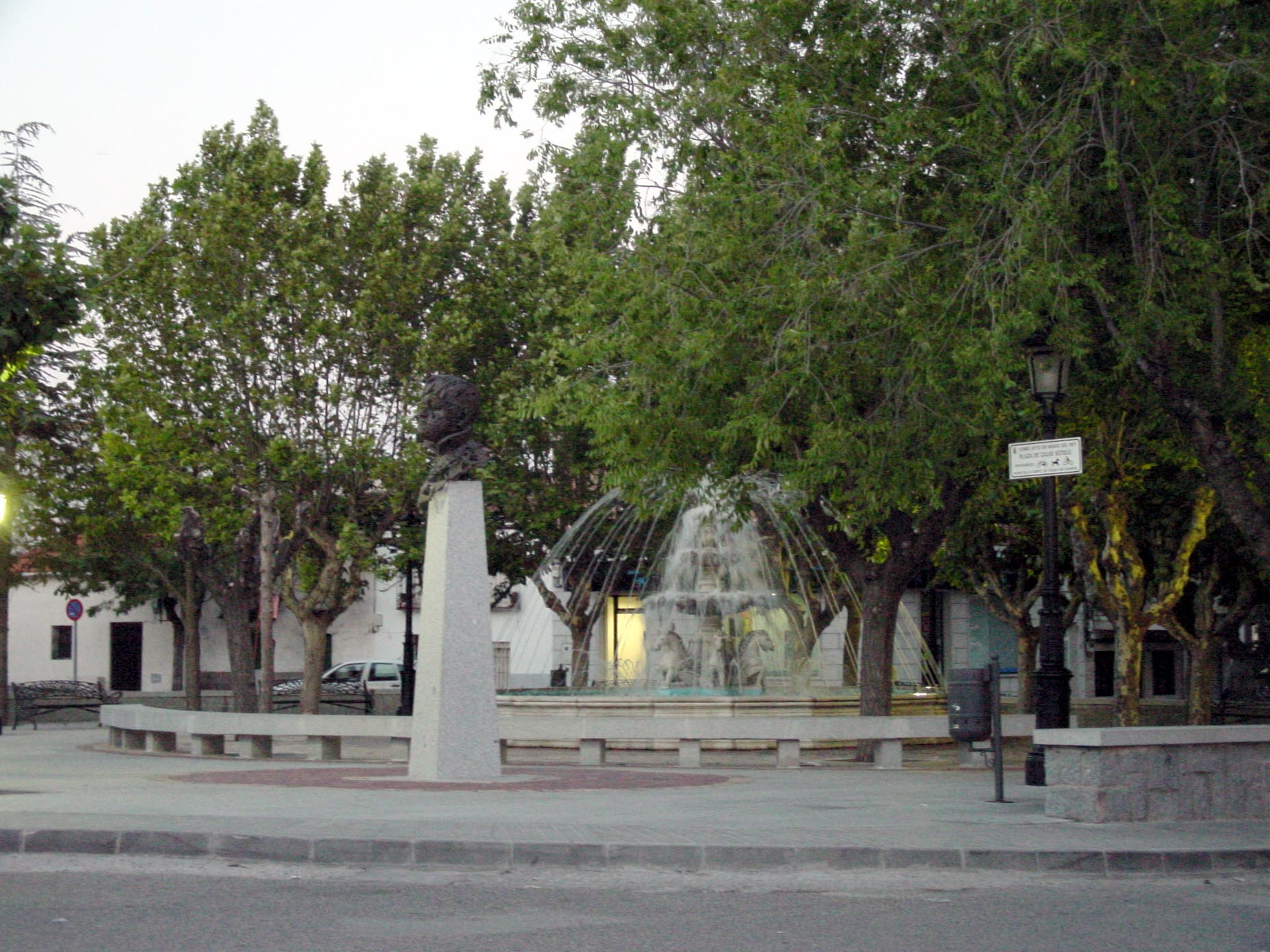
Plaza con fuente en Navas del Rey

== Rural Tourism ==
Township Navas del Rey is located in the southwest of the Autonomous Community of Madrid, within the region of Basin Alberche river, its location in the transition zone between the Sierra de Guadarrama and Sierra de Gredos, makes it an ideal place for rural tourism.

In the municipality, there is a significant number of plant and animal species of low ecological value. Its characteristic forests of oaks and pines give a unique color to the landscape. In its unique fauna includes species in danger of extinction, such as the imperial eagle, the black stork.

== History ==
The settlement of Navas del Rey is not known to have a specific origin. Some historians link the town to the Monastery of Santa María de Valdeiglesia in the 12th century, although some texts recovered in the Libro de la montería of Alfonso XI note that the area was used by monarchs for hunting. In the vicinity of the settlement, the hunting pavilion of Castilian monarchs known as the House of La Asperilla could be found situated in a meadow owned by the crown, known as Dehesa Real.

The first form that the urban centre took was in 1774, when the ecclesiastical separation of the township from San Martín de Valdeiglesias was recognised.
